= Sorcery: Contested Realm =

Collectible Card Game

- Designers: Erik Olofsson; Rafael Novellino; Nickolas Reynolds
- Publishers: Erik's Curiosa Limited
- Publication: 2022; 4 years ago
- Genres: Collectible card game
- Players: 2 to 4
- Playing time: 15–90 minutes
- Age range: 12+

Sorcery: Contested Realm, or Sorcery, is a tabletop collectible card game designed by Erik Olofsson and published in 2022 by Erik's Curiosa Limited.

== Publishing history ==
Sorcery was promoted as an "old school" fantasy card game for players with a "rich imagination, tactical nerve and an appreciation for hand-painted art". The first edition, Alpha Set, was released during May 2023 after a successful Kickstarter campaign which raised NZ$5,784,804 pledged by 6,456 backers. This release was exclusive to Kickstarter backers and featured 403 different playable cards. The Beta Set and its booster packs were released to retail stores in October 2023.

The subsequent set after Beta, Arthurian Legends, a booster set focused on Arthurian mythology which featured new gameplay mechanics and 220 additional cards, was released to retail in October 2024. During 2025 the Dragonlord miniset was released containing 13 different dragon-themed cards whose art was done by Ed Beard Jr. In December 2025 a fourth large set was released named Gothic consisting of 440 different cards and featuring a mix of demonic, angelic, undead, religious and lovecraftian horror themes.

Erik's Curiosa has announced that a special set of preconstructed decks, Frost Mage vs Lavamancer, will release in November 2026. This set features reprints of previous cards, exclusive cards to the Frost Mage vs Lavamancer set, and previews of cards from the upcoming Baldassare's Travels release. Initially available at the Avatar of the Realm event in Boston, the decks will subsequently be available worldwide beginning November 14, 2026.

Across Alpha to Gothic, booster packs include extremely rare “Curio” Cards relating to the game's development, alternative art or various easter eggs. Interestingly, Erik’s Curiosa has never officially acknowledged or denied the existence of the “curio” cards, increasing its appeal of being discovered during packs opening.

Sorcery: Contested Realm Sets
Name	Release Date	Notes
Alpha	June 2023	Kickstarter exclusive
Beta	November 2023	First retail set
Arthurian Legends	October 2024	Standalone expansion
Dragonlord	August 2025	Limited edition 14-card miniset in collaboration with artist Ed Beard Jr.
Gothic	December 2025	440 cards, largest set to date
Frost Mage Vs Lavamancer	November 2026	Two ready-to-play decks
Upcoming releases
Baldassare's Travels	March 2027	

== Art and design ==
The visual identity of Sorcery: Contested Realm is defined by its exclusive use of hand-painted artwork, a departure from the digital illustration standards of contemporary trading card games.

The game's developer, Erik Olofsson, was co-founder of Grinding Gear Games (GGG) and the original Art and Creative Director for Path of Exile, known for his focus on dark, realistic item art and atmosphere. He left GGG around 2022 to create Sorcery: Contested Realm, though he still consults for GGG. As an avid collector and player of Magic: The Gathering, Olofsson is also the current owner of the Black Lotus original art painted by Christopher Rush.

Together with his team Erik's Curiosa, they commissioned a roster of fantasy artists, many of whom were instrumental in the early aesthetics of Magic: The Gathering, and other collectible card games including Guardians and Wyvern. Sorcery's design features hand-painted art from prominent fantasy artists, including Frank Frazetta, Ian Miller, Gerald Brom, Jeff Easley, Rodney Matthews, Dan Seagrave and Magic's veteran artists such as Liz Danforth, Quinton Hoover, Drew Tucker, Melissa Benson, Jeff Menges, and Anson Maddocks. In addition, Sorcery has also seen a growing pool of international talented artists such as Séverine Pineaux, Marta Molina and Michal Nagypál.

== Gameplay ==
Two players, depicted by their Avatar cards, play cards onto a 5x4 playing field called The Realm. Each player having their own deck of cards split into two parts: The Atlas – site cards that can be played on empty Void spaces filling out the board with new areas for their minions to move onto and control; and The Spellbook – spell cards that can summon minions to The Realm, relics that can be carried by the forces in The Realm, and magics to create short or long-term effects through auras and monuments. Deckbuilding is based on the rarity system with each card being represented by Ordinary, Exceptional, Elite or Unique rarity. Players are allowed to have four of each ordinary card, three of each exceptional, two of each elite and one of each unique to build their Atlas and Spellbook.

The game's goal is reducing an opponent's life total to zero, placing them at death's door, and then deliving a final death blow. Additional strategic depth is added through the regions of The Realm: Void, Surface, Underground and Underwater which give The Realm a physical persistence of a tactical game board by defining where and how the minions and the Avatars can move.

There are four elements in the game which describe the types of magics and spells being played:

- Fire: Focused on "Raw Damage" and destruction.
- Air: Focused on "Movement" and indirect, random lightning effects.
- Water: Focused on "Control" and altering the board (drowning/pushing).
- Earth: Focused on "The Physical" (Minions, Sites, and staying power).

Two-Headed Dragon (2HD) is a community created format (by Beasts of the Bay) that is played with two teams of two players each. It is a play on Magic’s Two-Headed Giant format. The goal is to foster even more unique interactions and give opportunity space for cards that aren’t normally played in 1v1 constructed. 2HD is meant to be "fun, wild, and pushing the limits of what Sorcery gameplay can be".

== Reception ==
Polygon reported that the Kickstarter for Sorcery's first set was the 6th most funded tabletop Kickstarter in 2022. The Arthurian Legends booster was 7th on TCGplayer's October 2024 Top 25 Sealed TCG Products list, which ranks games sold on their platform by dollar volume. The Arthurian Legends booster set was nominated for the Randomized Constructible Game category of the 2025 GAMA Origins Awards.

Sean Migalla, writing for Screen Rant, noted that he "was pleasantly surprised by how unique and fun Sorcery: Contested Realm is" and praised Sorcery's Atlas deck for fixing many of the issues of Magic: the Gathering's land system. Ellis Carne from Zatu Games gave an excellent 5-star review for the Alpha set, citing gameplay to be an "absolute pleasure and one of the best card games I have played in a long while". Jason Grabher-Meyer on TCGplayer felt Sorcery was "designed to be a narrative experience, and that's where it stands apart as something completely different from other TCGs".

In July 2025, it was announced that Star City Games (SCG) had partnered with Erik’s Curiosa to bring Sorcery: Contested Realm to SCG CON events, beginning with SCG CON Houston. “This partnership will introduce the uniquely immersive trading card game to a broader audience through curated experiences, Learn-to-Play sessions, and organized play opportunities,” shared Pete Hoefling, President of SCG.

== Community ==
It is not uncommon for longtime Magic: The Gathering players that have become disenfranchised, citing the expansion of Universes Beyond as a break from MTG’s established lore boundaries, along with ongoing product fatigue from an increasingly aggressive release schedule. As a result, some are leaving the game in search of alternatives like Sorcery, or taking it up as a "2nd" TCG.

The Sorcery community has been steadily expanding since Alpha with various geographical regions being well represented by players and collectors alike, often attracted to the art, unique blend of tactical depth and narrative immersion. Collectability of game pieces such as foiled versions which features full art on card backs, and the extremely rare curios randomly allocated in boosters, have helped with fueling the game's growth.

Jens and Sofie Heiberg Plovdrup, better known as the duo behind the YouTube channel Cardboard Guide featuring Sorcery news, gameplay and card discussions - have become beloved fixtures especially in the Europe community. In the United States, Mike Servati, who runs the Collector Arthouse site, often delves into the historical development of the game pieces and art advocacy for Sorcery's artists. The Eternal Durdles also sees regular podcasts and frequent Sorcery articles contributed by various content creators.

Naoki, also known as Haine from Japan, and Wizards' Den on his YouTube Channel, is a seasoned Sorcery judge and player that has helped to shape the community in Japan. In recognition of his effort, the site card named "Wizard's Den" was released in the Arthurian Legends set, along with a curios version printed in Japanese. The game has also found its bearings in the Asia-Pacific region including Australia, New Zealand, Singapore, Philippine and Hong Kong with growing communities.

At Gen Con 2026, the final round of the Grand Contest constructed tournament had to be cancelled due to a storm and tornado that caused rain to leak from the ceiling of the Indiana Convention Center. To offset the change, prizing for the tournament was almost doubled.
