= Unsanctioned (Magic: The Gathering) =

Magic: The Gathering expansion set

Unsanctioned is a box set of Magic: The Gathering cards released in 2020. It is an Un-set consisting of satirical silver-bordered cards that are not legal in Magic tournaments. Unlike previous Un-sets, which had been sold in packs of randomized boosters, Unsanctioned consists of five mono-color half-decks that can be combined to create a sixty-card two-color deck, designed for use in a two-player game. The set was generally well-received by critics.

== Design and components ==
According to designer Mark Rosewater, the Unsanctioned concept stemmed from Wizards of the Coast requesting a ready-made product which could be sold at any time. The project was overseen by Gavin Verhey. Citing the success of Unstable, a satirical Un-set of Magic: The Gathering cards, Verhey proposed to Rosewater the creation of a set of silver-bordered cards, which would be sold in a box set (as opposed to randomized boosters, which previous Un-sets had been sold in). Silver-bordered cards have been used in previous Un-sets, and are not legal in Magic tournaments. Rosewater, who agreed with the proposal, was tasked with the design of new cards in the Unsanctioned deck.

Unsanctioned is a two player game and consists of five half-decks, one for each of the colors in Magic. Two decks of thirty cards are combined to create one sixty-card two-color deck for each player. Sixteen cards in the Unsanctioned deck are original designs commissioned for the set, while seventy are reprints from Unglued, Unhinged, and Unstable, and seventy are land cards.

Among the sixteen unique cards included in Unsanctioned is Alexander Clamilton. The card is a Clamfolk (which were initially included in Unglued to satirise anthropomorphized animals in Magic), and is named for the American founding father. Another in the set is Stet, Draconic Proofreader — a dragon creature who is a proofreader specifically because it is an unlikely profession for a dragon, and is named for the editing term stet. Unsanctioned also includes the first squirrel commander card, named Acornelia, Fashionable Filcher. In an interview with Cracked.com, Rosewater said that he had been discouraged from including squirrels in regular black-bordered Magic sets, and so decided to include squirrel cards in silver-bordered Un-sets.

== Release and reception ==
Unsanctioned was released on February 28, 2020. (Note: Some sources list a release date of February 29, 2020.) Critical reception for the set was largely positive. Writing for Dicebreaker, Sara Elsam emphasised the difference between Unsanctioned and a traditional game of Magic, comparing the set to a dexterity board game. She described Unsanctioned as a "surreal and madcap experience", saying that the set invoked the history and lore of Magic, including references to banned game mechanics. Overall, Elsam concluded that the gameplay of Unsanctioned, despite its satirical nature, still allowed players to control the board as in standard Magic, and that Unsanctioned allowed for play from both experienced and beginner players of Magic, incorporating "a lot of the beauty [...] and tense tactics that make regular Magic: The Gathering so compelling".

Zach Barash of website Hipsters of the Coast said that the preconstructed nature of Unsanctioned helped equalise the board between himself, an experienced competitive player, and his opponent, who had not played Magic in years. Barash was broadly positive towards the set's mechanics, saying "overall, we had a blast", but noted flaws such as a difficulty in utilising the Augment mechanic, and described the Goblin S.W.A.T. Team card as ineffective, "distracting and annoying".
