= MWS =

MWS may refer to:

- Magic Workstation, a gameplay simulator for Magic: The Gathering
- Marden–Walker syndrome, a rare autosomal recessive disorder
- Member of the Wernerian Natural History Society, a former Scottish learned society
- Modular weapon system, a rifle which has components that can be reconfigured to give the weapon different capabilities
- Muckle–Wells syndrome, a rare autosomal dominant disease
- Murakami-Wolf-Swenson, a former name of Fred Wolf Films Dublin, an animation company
