= List of most expensive cards =

List of most expensive cards can refer to:

- List of most expensive CCG cards
- List of most expensive sports cards
