= List of most expensive cards from collectible card games =

A collectible card game (CCG), also called a trading card game (TCG) among other names, (Note: A collectible card game (CCG) may also be known as a trading card game (TCG), customizable card game, expandable card game, or simply as a card game. Terms such as "collectible" and "trading" are often used interchangeably because of copyrights and marketing strategies of game companies.) is a type of card game that mixes strategic deck building elements with features of trading cards. Cards in CCGs are specially designed sets of playing cards. Each card represents an element of the theme and rules of the game, and each can fall in categories such as creatures, enhancements, events, resources, and locations. All cards within the CCG typically share the same common backside art, while the front has a combination of proprietary artwork or images to embellish the card along with instructions for the game and flavor text. CCGs are typically themed around fantasy or science fiction genres, and have also included horror themes, cartoons, and sports, and may include licensed intellectual properties.

The value of a CCG card depends on a combination of the popularity of the game, the popularity of the intellectual property on which the card is based, the card's condition, the scarcity of the card, whether the card has an artist's signature, and the gameplay value (power or efficiency) of the card. In some cases, the cards have become collector's items of considerable value. Most of the priciest cards come from the first CCG, Magic: The Gathering, or from some of the other most popular CCGs such as Pokémon or Yu-Gi-Oh!.

== List of highest prices (US$300,000+) paid ==
This list only contains cards actually sold, not estimated prices of unsold cards, at a price of US$300,000 or more.

The list is ordered by default by original sale price but can be re-sorted by consumer price index inflation-adjusted value (in bold) in United States dollars in 2025. (Note: The Wikipedia template uses a yearly average inflation. Using monthly averages gives slightly different numbers, most significantly for cards sold early or late in a year with significant inflation.)

Cards are evaluated by third-party services, most often Professional Sports Authenticator (PSA), Certified Guaranty Company (CGC), Beckett Grading Services (BGS), or Sportscard Guaranty Corporation (SGC), and given a grade on a 10-point scale based on condition.

The population column is the number of copies of the card in the original print run, not the number of known surviving copies in the present or of the graded quality.

Original price	Inflation-adjusted price	Date of sale	Card name	Year printed or released	Set	Game	Grade	Auction house	Seller	Buyer	Population in original print run (Note: This population column is the number of copies of the card in the original print run, not the number of known surviving copies in the present or of the graded quality.)	Notes	References
$16,492,000	$16,492,000	February 16, 2026	Pikachu Illustrator	1998	none (contest promo)	Pokémon Trading Card Game	PSA 10	Goldin Auctions	Logan Paul	AJ Scaramucci	41 (Note: 41 copies are known to have been printed: 39 were given out to winners of 3 CoroCoro Comic-sponsored illustration contests, and 2 were later released through sale at auction by Yuichi Konno, one of the Pokémon TCG designers.)		
$5,275,000	$6,267,423	July 22, 2021	Pikachu Illustrator	1998	none (contest promo)	Pokémon Trading Card Game	PSA 10	private sale	Marwan Dubsy	Logan Paul	41	purchased with combination of $1.275 million PSA 9 Pikachu Illustrator and $4 million cash	
$3,000,000	$3,078,922	March 2024	Black Lotus	1993	Alpha	Magic: The Gathering	CGC Pristine 10	private sale	Adam Cai	Benjamin Be	1,100 (Note: There were originally 1,100 copies of Black Lotus in the print run for Limited Edition Alpha.)	purchased with bitcoin; unlike most of the other most expensive Black Lotuses, not signed by artist Christopher Rush	
$2,000,000	$2,113,368	August 1, 2023	The One Ring	2023	The Lord of the Rings: Tales of Middle-earth	Magic: The Gathering	PSA 9	private sale	Brook Trafton	Post Malone	1	one-of-a-kind printing (only copy of this version of the card ever printed) with unique art and Tengwar instead of English text	
$1,275,000	$1,514,875	June 2021	Pikachu Illustrator	1998	none (contest promo)	Pokémon Trading Card Game	PSA 9	private sale	Matt Allen	Logan Paul	41		
$900,000	$990,164	February 23, 2022	Pikachu Illustrator	1998	none (contest promo)	Pokémon Trading Card Game	PSA 7	Goldin Auctions	private seller	private buyer	41		
$800,000	$880,146	2022	Black Lotus (artist proof)	1993	Alpha	Magic: The Gathering		private sale	private seller	Post Malone		artist proof signed by artist Christopher Rush	
$672,000	$739,322	October 29, 2022	Pikachu Illustrator	1998	none (contest promo)	Pokémon Trading Card Game	CGC 9.5	Goldin Auctions	Blake Martinez	private buyer	41		
$615,000	$649,861	March 24, 2023	Black Lotus (artist proof)	1993	Alpha	Magic: The Gathering	CGC 8.5	Heritage Auctions	Jeff Ferreira	private buyer		artist proof signed by artist Christopher Rush	
$540,000	$570,609	March 16, 2023	Black Lotus	1993	Alpha	Magic: The Gathering	PSA 10	PWCC Marketplace	private seller	private buyer	1,100	signed by artist Christopher Rush	
$511,100	$607,257	January 27, 2021	Black Lotus	1993	Alpha	Magic: The Gathering	PSA 10	eBay	private seller	private buyer	1,100	signed by artist Christopher Rush	
$493,230	$586,025	January 2021	Charizard (Topsun blue back)	1997	Topsun chewing gum promos	Pokémon Trading Card Game	PSA 10	Goldin Auctions	private seller	private buyer			
$444,000	$464,941	September 2023	Silver No. 2 Pikachu Trainer (1997-1998 Lizardon Tournament version)	1997	none (tournament trophy promo)	Pokémon Trading Card Game	PSA 10	Goldin Auctions	private seller	private buyer	14 (Note: Gold No. 1, Silver No. 2, and Bronze No. 3 Pikachu Trainer trophy cards were awarded to, respectively, 1st-, 2nd-, and 3rd-place finishers in the 14–15 June 1997 1st Official Pokémon Card Game Tournament series, the November 8, 1997-February 15, 1998 Lizardon (Charizard) Mega Battle Tournament series, and the July 19 – September 3, 1998, Kamex (Blastoise) Mega Battle Tournament series. Though the trophy cards awarded across the three tournament series had identical art and frames, they can be distinguished through differences in the textboxes: the 1997 1st Official Tournament trophies have no number in the textbox and total 4 copies for each placement (gold, silver, and bronze), the 1997-1998 Lizardon Tournament trophies have the number "1" in the textbox and total 14 copies for each placement, and the 1998 Kamex Tournament trophies have the number "2" in the textbox and also total 14 copies for each placement.)	originally awarded as a trophy/prize to 2nd-place finishers in the 1997-1998 Lizardon (Charizard) Mega Battle Tournament series	
$420,000	$462,076	March 2022	Charizard (English holographic shadowless)	1999	English Base Set 1st Edition	Pokémon Trading Card Game	PSA 10	PWCC Marketplace	private seller	private buyer	4,000+		
$369,000	$459,056	December 12, 2020	Charizard (English holographic shadowless)	1999	English Base Set 1st Edition	Pokémon Trading Card Game	SGC 10	Goldin Auctions	private seller	private buyer	4,000+	one of two Charizard cards sold for similar prices ($350,100 and $369,000) on different auction websites on the same day	
$360,000	$427,729	January 2021	Blastoise (commissioned presentation galaxy star holo)	1998	none (test print card)	Pokémon Trading Card Game	CGC 8.5	Heritage Auctions	private seller	private buyer	2	one of only 2 test printings of this card, created by Wizards of the Coast to convince Nintendo to let them publish the English release of the Pokémon TCG, and the whereabouts or survival of the other copy is unknown	
$350,100	$435,543	December 12, 2020	Charizard (English holographic shadowless)	1999	English Base Set 1st Edition	Pokémon Trading Card Game	PSA 10	eBay	private seller	private buyer	4,000+	one of two Charizard cards sold for similar prices ($350,100 and $369,000) on different auction websites on the same day	
$336,000	$369,661	March 4, 2022	Charizard (English holographic shadowless)	1999	English Base Set 1st Edition	Pokémon Trading Card Game	PSA 10	Heritage Auctions	private seller	private buyer	4,000+		
$324,000	$356,459	April 16, 2022	Charizard (Japanese holographic)	1996	Japanese Base Set 1st Edition	Pokémon Trading Card Game	PSA 10	PWCC Marketplace	private seller	private buyer		signed by artist Mitsuhiro Arita	
$311,800	$370,461	March 28, 2021	Charizard (English holographic shadowless)	1999	English Base Set 1st Edition	Pokémon Trading Card Game	PSA 10	eBay	private seller	private buyer	4,000+		
$311,211	$328,852	April 29, 2023	Tyler the Great Warrior	2005	none (Make-A-Wish Foundation promo)	Yu-Gi-Oh! Trading Card Game	BGS 7	eBay	Tyler Gressle	private buyer	1	only one copy of card printed, as a Make-A-Wish Foundation gift to seller, whom the card is named after	
$300,000	$356,441	January 14, 2021	Charizard (English holographic shadowless)	1999	English Base Set 1st Edition	Pokémon Trading Card Game	PSA 10	Heritage Auctions	private seller	private buyer	4,000+		
$300,000	$317,005	April 2023	Bronze No. 3 Pikachu Trainer (1997 1st Official Tournament version)	1997	none (tournament trophy promo)	Pokémon Trading Card Game	PSA 8	Heritage Auctions	private seller	private buyer	4	originally awarded as a trophy/prize to 3rd-place finishers in the 1997 1st Official Pokémon Card Game Tournament series	

== See also ==
- Collectible card game
- List of collectible card games
- List of most expensive books and manuscripts
- List of most expensive coins
- List of most expensive philatelic items
- List of most expensive sports cards
- Magic: The Gathering finance
