= Friday Night Magic =

Format of Magic: The Gathering tournaments

- Abbreviation: FNM
- Parent organization: Wizards Play Network
- Website: wizards.com/fnm

Friday Night Magic (or FNM) is a format of Magic: The Gathering tournaments, held on Friday nights in gaming stores and associations all across the world. They are designed to be a beginner-friendly introduction to organized play.

== History ==
In 1996, the Pro Tour debuted as part of Wizards of the Coast's marketing strategy for Magic. People who participate in Friday Night Magic (FNM) "earn Planeswalker Points, which can help them gain free entry to the next two levels: Pro Tour Qualifiers (PTQ) and Grand Prix (GP)". The first FNM promo card was released in 2000.

Over the course of the 2000s, Wizards shifted their strategic focus to amateur players. This included a shift to more events in local stores that participate in the Wizards Play Network with FNM advertised as "the event where new players can approach the game, and start building their community". Internationally, "thousands of games shops" participate in FNM. In 2015, the Wizards Play Network loosened restrictions on what formats of Magic could be played at official FNM events. In 2018, The New Yorker reported that "even as it has grown in popularity and size, Magic flies low to the ground. It thrives on the people who gather at lunch tables, in apartments, or in one of the six thousand stores worldwide that Wizards has licensed to put on weekly tournaments dubbed Friday Night Magic".

In March 2020, due to the COVID-19 pandemic, Wizards of the Coast suspended in-store events in North America, Europe, and Latin America. In response to the in-person suspension, Wizards of the Coast launched the Friday Night Magic at Home program utilizing the online game Magic: The Gathering Arena. Polygon reported "stores that typically host Friday Night Magic events will be able to pass out reward codes to encourage communities to come together — Wizards of the Coast said its helping stores set up online communities if they don’t already have them". In May 2021, the in-store suspension was lifted in the United States, Japan and Africa but not in Latin America or Europe.

== Format ==
FNM is managed by the Wizards Play Network (WPN). FNM tournaments are run at Regular Rules Enforcement Level (REL), which is the least stringent REL. This is used to encourage players to learn the correct way to play, readying them for stricter tournaments.

Prior to December 2014, Friday Night Magic tournaments were limited to four sanctioned formats: constructed, booster draft, sealed deck, or Two-Headed Giant. It was announced that starting in 2015 all sanctioned tournament formats and all casual formats (such as Commander) could be used at FNM events. While this rules change announcement stated that all casual formats could be included in FNM, as of 2019, the Wizards Event Reporter (Wizards' tournament reporting software) only includes a limited number of casual formats and does not include the announced "Invent Your Own Format".

=== Incentives ===
As an incentive to encourage regular participation in FNM, every month Wizards of the Coast releases promotional material, such as promo cards or packs, to be distributed at FNM events. These tournament-legal promos sometimes acquire substantial secondary market value if there is enough demand for the card.

FNM foils are distributed only through FNM events. Wizards originally included obligatory guidelines on how stores should hand out these promo cards. After the inclusion of casual formats in 2015, guidelines for prize distribution were no longer obligatory but only recommended. Shops may instead set up their own guidelines on how FNM foils are distributed at events they host. Additionally, these FNM foils were given to shops based on their WPN-levels instead of the number of FNM events held each month.

From October 2017 to April 2018, promo cards were replaced with promo "Double Sided Tokens". However, after feedback to the change, Wizards returned to promo cards. Starting in 2019, with the Core Set 2020, promo cards were replaced with packs of promo cards. Scott Thorne, for the industry trade ICv2, wrote that "given the randomness of the contents of the packs and the rarity of the cards inside them, I expect these to draw a lot of people to Friday Night Magic and other events, since unlike the current promo card system wherein WOTC announces the cards available for each block, the Promo Packs are random, having that same appeal that regular Magic booster packs and the Saturday Showdown [...] packs do. We have players who show up specifically to play in Standard format tournaments only because they want one of the Saturday Showdown packs and I expect the new Promo Packs to drive players to participate in WOTC OP as well".

== Reception ==
J. Patrick Williams, in an essay in the book Gaming as Culture, highlighted how weekly events such as Friday Night Magic facilitate and "routinized consumption" in players; for example, in Magic sealed draft tournaments, the booster packs are bought from retailer holding the event. Williams wrote that, "Wizards of the Coast charges a fee for participation [...] For recreational and competitive players alike, the chance to win limited edition prizes is worth the price to register. [...] Players benefit because the company and retailer set aside time and space specifically for them to gather and play [...]. Retail stores benefit from the foot traffic generated by the company's official support [...]. From a critical perspective, the organization of game play helps ensure that both the company and the retailer benefit monetarily from players' involvement while the players' 'needs' for things are also satisfied".

Many stores attribute the "enduring popularity" of the game and large player turnouts to Friday Night Magic. However, other store owners and organizers have criticized the program. Rod Lamberti, a US store owner, wrote that while the Magic game "drives sales", "casual gamers come in spend roughly 15 minutes and spend more money than a gamer customer who is here to play events does" and that the structure of the WPN store levels can incentivize newer and smaller stores to run "very cheap events or even free events, which devalues having events for stores". Per Lamberti, both Wizards of the Coast and Magic judges are focused on increasing players of the game and are not focused on pushing players to purchase the product at the location where events are held. Sabina Browne, a European tournament organizer, "is critical of Wizards' recent decision to stipulate that Friday Night Magic be held only on Fridays. For Browne, it is nothing short of a disaster as far as attracting women players to the game goes. [...] Run during the week, FNM normalizes Magic as a sensible hobby choice compatible with a hectic nine-to-five working life. Forced to compete with a mainstream social night, the fantasy card game comes off as a marginal pursuit. That stigma makes the game a far harder sell to potential new players".

Paul Miller, for The Verge in 2013, tried Magic, including attending Friday Night Magic in Long Island, however, determined the game wasn't the right fit for him. Miller wrote, "this wasn’t the sort of detached I-used-to-play-this-growing-up Magic that NYU students play in Manhattan clubs. This was a serious nerd haven. Gameplay etiquette was at a maximum, hygiene was at a minimum, women were scarce, and many guys were wearing what appeared to be pajamas [...]. Everyone I met was nice, welcoming, helpful, intelligent, passionate, self-confident, at ease, and basically great. [...] Without extensive knowledge of the cards, the gameplay, the 'meta game,' the people, or really anything relevant to the situation at hand, all I could do was sit there and ask dumb questions".

Rebecca Angel, for Wired in 2013, wrote about a conversation she had on women attending Friday Night Magic. Angel wrote that the barista she talked to "said it was rare for a girl to ever return. [...] When I asked him for specifics, he said the guys weren’t rude, they were just so awkward and obviously uncomfortable playing the game with the girl. He imagined it just wasn’t a fun time for the girls who tried. He always hoped they would come back, because the more girls that came, the more the guys would get used to it. But who wants to be the girl to have to help guys adjust? My own son, who is in the perfect demographic for Magic (14 year old white boy) was completely intimidated at a local gathering and refused to play. How must it feel to be someone who doesn’t fit in at all?"

Charlie Hall, for Polygon in 2018, wrote that while he was nervous before trying Friday Night Magic he "didn’t have anything to be afraid of". Before the event began, the shop owner played a few practice hands and gave Hall "tips on how to win with the deck" he had created. Hall commented that "what struck me more than anything was just how social an experience playing Magic is. It was really wonderful to get out from behind my computer screen for an evening, and talk to strangers about a game and a hobby that they were excited about. [...] More than just finding a few good hours of great gaming, I stumbled across a whole new community. Best of all, everyone I sat down to play against seemed invested in teaching me how to get better".
