= Unhinged (Magic: The Gathering) =

Magic: The Gathering expansion set

- Horseshoe (a U)
- Released: November 19, 2004
- Size: 141 cards
- Keywords: Gotcha! Super Haste
- Mechanics: Artists, Names
- Development code: Unnamed
- Expansion code: UNH
| ← Champions of Kamigawa | Betrayers of Kamigawa → |

Unhinged is a humor and parody themed expansion set to the collectible card game Magic: The Gathering. Unhinged was released on November 19, 2004. Its tone is less serious than traditional Magic expansions. It is a follow-on to Unglued, an earlier humor themed expansion set. It was followed in turn by Unstable.

Unhinged is an English language only expansion; lead designer for Magic: The Gathering Mark Rosewater has said that due to the nature of humor and the many plays-on-words used in both Unhinged and Unglued, sets such as these will always be English language only. The only other English language exclusive sets were released before Magic gained enough popularity to support foreign markets.

== Background and release ==
Wizards released a humor-themed Magic expansion set, Unglued, on 7 August 1998. Much of the set's humor came from meta-humor references at the game itself and its mechanics. Many cards featured mechanics deemed too strange or impractical for a "serious", tournament-legal expansion. Because of the success of the set, designers began work on an Unglued sequel, named Unglued 2: The Obligatory Sequel. However, Wizards of the Coast felt that releasing another comedy set along with the standard serious sets, would go beyond market saturation, so Unglued 2 was scrapped.

On April 1, 2004, Magic designer Mark Rosewater posted an article, announcing the sequel to Unglued, Unhinged. The next day, amid speculation that the announcement was an April Fool's Day joke, Rosewater posted a poll asking readers if they believed an Unglued sequel was actually in the works and if they would enjoy such a sequel. Three days later, Rosewater confirmed that Unhinged was a reality.

Rosewater would comment many years later that "While there are a lot of individual cards in Unhinged I am proud of, I feel the set as a whole was a bit of a letdown."

== Defining aspects of the set ==
- "Donkey" creatures are featured on a number of cards, similar to the way chickens were featured in Unglued. This allows humorous puns of phrases containing the word ass ("Bad Ass", "Cheap Ass", "Ass Whuppin'", and so on).
- "Monkey" creatures are also featured on some cards, similar to the way clamfolk were featured in Unglued. Cards with monkeys on them, such as "Tainted Monkey" and "Rod of Spanking", often involve choosing a single word or a player saying a word or sentence.
- Fractions, especially 1/2, can be used where only natural numbers could be used before: casting costs, damage, life totals, mana, power, and toughness can all be affected.
- Gotcha! - Cards which can be returned from graveyard to hand if your opponent takes a certain action; the most frequent trigger was saying a specific word on a card. Designer Mark Rosewater would later comment that "gotcha was one of the worst mechanics I've ever designed and it sucked the fun out of what was supposed to be an extra-fun format," because playing against Gotcha! cards encouraged players to play in silence.
- Cards that only have a specific effect if you win a short subgame, such as a staring contest, arm wrestling, rock/paper/scissors, or even another game of Magic within the original game (see Shahrazad and Enter the Dungeon, which is a parody of Shahrazad).
- Several cards have effects that can apply only to cards with a specific artist, name, or collector's number.
- Several creatures have effects that forces the controller to sacrifice them if they do something specific, such as speak or not have a finger on that creature.
- Several cards are parodies of cards in Unglued or other Magic sets, such as City of Ass (for City of Brass) and Greater Morphling (for Morphling)
- This set includes premium (foil) cards that have hidden pictures or words in it.
- Until Amonkhet's Invocations, this was the only set to include premium (foil) cards that are not black-bordered (although the promotional silver-bordered Holiday Cards are exclusively foil, but not part of any set)
- "Avatar of Me" and "Water Gun Balloon Game" have added the colors Pink, Hazel, Brown and Gray (with Avatar of Me it is possible to have multi-color (Heterochromia iridum) and purple/violet (Albinism)) to the original five colors of mana when playing with silver-bordered cards.
- Full art basic land cards in each pack, similar to those released in Unglued. They remain highly sought after by players and collectors.

== Unhinged secret message ==
Much like Unglued before it, each card in the Unhinged set has a single word printed on the bottom of the card after the artist's name and card number. Alone these single words made little to no sense but when all cards are placed in the proper order with other cards in the series they spell out a secret message detailing cards that allegedly did not make it into the set. Placing all the Unhinged cards in reverse alphabetical order will cause the following message to appear:

"Here are some more cards that didn't make it: Moronic Tutor; Lint Golem; Wave of Incontinence; I'm Quitting Magic; Bob from Accounting; Castrate; Mishra's Bling Bling; Dead Bunny Isle; Circle of Protection: Pants; Time Fart; Sliver and Onions; Kobold Ass Master; Thanks, Barn; Mild Mongrel; Robo-Samurai; Obligatory Angel; Chump-Blocking Orphan; Wrath of Dog; Celery Stalker; Hugs-a-lot Demon; Assticore; Codpiece of the Chosen; Hurl; What the Cluck?!; Nachomancer; Scrubotomy; Arcbound Noah; Darksteel Spork; Look at Me, I'm Accounts Receivable; Hydro Djinn; Bad Stone Rain Variant; S.O.B.F.M.; Pinko Kami; Purple Nurple; Form of Uncle Istvan; Them's Fightin' Wards; Spleen of Ramos; Fifteenth Pick; Squizzle, Goblin Nabizzle; Zombie Cheerleading Squad; Two-Way Myr; Bone Flute 2: Electric Boogaloo; Magic Offline; Nutclamp; Bwahahahaaa!; Dragon Ass; Phyrexian Sno-Cone Machine; Chimney Pimp; R.T.F.C.; Greased Weasel; Flame War; We Don't Need No Stinkin' Merfolk; Ting!; Timmy Power Gamer; and Disrobing Scepter (again!)."

Also, arranging the flavor text for the cards Creature Guy, Save Life, Deal Damage, Spell Counter, and Kill Destroy (all of which are cards with a "Gotcha" rule on them) in that order, gives the limerick:

There once was a player named Quinn, . . .
Who consistently managed to win.
Until he got singed . . .
Playing Unhinged, . . .
Getting "Gotcha'ed" again and again.
