= CardMaster =

CardMaster is a program for Magic: The Gathering published by Sky Hi Sales.

== Contents ==
CardMaster is a utility in which features help collectors keep track of cards using various categories and subcategories, and it also helps players construct decks.

== Reception ==
James V. Trunzo reviewed CardMaster in White Wolf Inphobia #53 (March, 1995) and stated that "CardMaster is an exciting program for Magic: The Gathering players and collectors. CardMaster's official WotC status promises big things for the program in versions to come ."

== Reviews ==
- The Duelist #6
