= Apprentice (Magic: The Gathering software) =

Magic: The Gathering software

Apprentice is a program that assists in playing Magic: The Gathering over the Internet and maintains a searchable database of Magic cards. It was developed by Dragonstar Studios from 1996 to 1999 and based on an earlier program from 1995 by Tan Thor Jen. Christopher Warden, owner of Dragonstar Studios, acquired the source code for the original 1995 Apprentice, which was written in Visual Basic. It was then ported to Delphi by Mike Allen and after creation of the 1.0 port development was continued by Ryan Davis. The last release was in the version 1.4 branch and a 2.0 branch, developed by Davis, was promised in the future. However, Dragonstar Studios disbanded. In 2007 Apprentice 2.0 was open sourced on SourceForge. In 2012 Apprentice started being updated again, with a new website created.

== Gameplay ==
Apprentice lacks a rules engine; the game moves forward by the players typing out their current actions. Apprentice simply provides an interface that can keep track of the current phase of the game; cards in play and their current state; and cards in the graveyard. There is no concept of card ownership; players may use as many copies of a card as they would like in decks they create. Cards which interact with sideboards such as the Judgment "wishes" or the Dissension split card Research/Development are not implemented directly, and are instead usually adjudicated by creating temporary new cards on the spot.

The old 1.46 is freeware and is downloadable without need for either charge or registration. The current version is free while it is in beta, pricing model of full version is currently unknown. However, when Dragonstar Studios disbanded, they did not release the Apprentice 1.0 source code due to the legal agreement between them and Wizards of the Coast. Hence, the 1.0 branch is frozen in time without the possibility of any future upgrades or bugfixes. However, the simple data format used to store cards has allowed new sets to be added and the registry of cards updated.

Apprentice was officially acknowledged and licensed by Wizards of the Coast, as it only uses publicly available rules and lists of cards.

== Netdraft ==
Netdraft is the main program used by both Apprentice and Magic Workstation to support "drafts," a popular limited format. Netdraft hosts up to 8 players who may draft from any magic set. This includes out of print sets as well as the most recent set in the interval between the Prerelease event and the street release. Unlike the original Apprentice, Netdraft has been occasionally updated, and is currently spartan but functional.

=== Backwash ===
Apprentice's usage was threatened with the proliferation of the "Backwash" program which allowed undetectable cheating; for example, the ordering of each player's library. This program threatened the viability of Apprentice in leagues where any kind of prizes were available. An update was created that allegedly allowed the staff to check for the use of such 'cheat' programs, however. Apprentice 2.0 includes encryption to prevent these types of exploits.

== Supported games ==
Games currently supported are Magic: the Gathering and Star Trek Customizable Card Game (2nd Edition only as of now).

== See also ==
- Magic: The Gathering Online
- Magic: The Gathering video games
