= Deck Daemon =

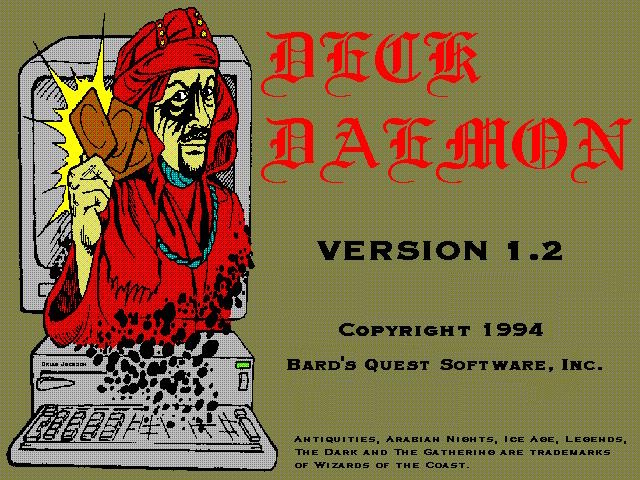
- Deck Daemon DOS Version 1.2 splash screen
- Developer: Bard's Quest Software
- Publisher: Bard's Quest Software
- Platforms: DOS, Windows
- Release: 1994

Deck Daemon is a program for Magic: The Gathering published by Bard's Quest Software.

== Contents ==
Deck Daemon is a utility in which features help collectors organize cards by aspects such as price and condition, and it also includes a DeckBuilder for players.

== Reception ==
James V. Trunzo reviewed Deck Daemon in White Wolf Inphobia #53 (March, 1995) and stated that "Overall, Deck Daemon 1.2 is a solid package, especially for the money. What's even more exciting is the fact that the program, as good as it is, will be even better. An enhanced DOS and Windows version will add to its luster and make it a must-have for any serious Magic: The Gathering fan."

== Reviews ==
- The Duelist #6
