= Black Lotus (Magic: The Gathering) =

Artifact card from Magic: The Gathering

Black Lotus, signed by artist Christopher Rush

Black Lotus is a card in the collectible card game Magic: The Gathering. Wizards of the Coast published the card in the earliest editions of the game. It is one of the game's most valuable collectible cards.

In game, the card allows the player to sacrifice the card when it is in play to generate three mana—game resources used to cast spells (play cards from the hand). Because it provides mana so quickly, it allows the player to cast spells earlier than their opponent, thus providing an advantage to the player. For this reason, it is one of the Power Nine, which are considered the most powerful cards in the game's history.

Most competitive formats ban the card. Its power, limited print and distribution have made it one of the most valuable Magic cards. In the early 2020s, two copies of the card were sold for approximately $500,000 each. An Alpha CGC 10 Black Lotus sold in 2024 for $3,000,000.

== History and design ==
Christopher Rush illustrated the card's art. Black Lotus was printed for the earliest core sets of Magic: The Gathering, the Limited Edition Alpha and Beta sets, and the Unlimited set, which were all released in 1993. The Alpha and Beta editions had black borders, and the Unlimited edition had white borders. The Black Lotus is an artifact card that players can put into play for free, since it requires zero mana to cast. Players can sacrifice (discard it from play) to add three mana of one color to their mana pool. Since a deck may contain four copies of any non-land card, a player could have four Black Lotus cards in their deck, providing a significant advantage in the early stages of the game.

Individual cards are often referred to by the print release, such as Alpha Black Lotus. Approximately 1,100 Black Lotus cards were printed for Alpha, 3,300 for Beta, and over 18,000 for Unlimited. In addition to the original, tournament-playable printings of Black Lotus, there are a few other promotional versions produced by Wizards of the Coast, that are not permitted in tournament play. These include artist proofs, Collectors' Edition cards, and oversized versions.

The card is banned from most competitive Magic formats owing to its power and relative scarcity. The only competitive setting in which it is not banned is the Vintage format, where only one copy of the card is allowed instead of the usual four. The card was omitted from Revised Edition, the core set that followed Unlimited, as were all other Power Nine cards, and none have been published in any subsequent set.

== Sales and legacy ==
The card's power and limited print has made it the most expensive Magic card, with mint condition Alpha cards being among the most valued. Considering this, publisher Wizards of the Coast stated that the card would not be reprinted, which would hurt its value among collectors. It was included, along with the other Power Nine cards and numerous other cards from the early sets of Magic: the Gathering, to the Reserved List, a list of cards that Wizards of the Coast stated would never be reprinted.

The 30th Anniversary set published by Wizards of the Coast in 2023 reprinted 15 cards from the original set, including Black Lotus. These are proxy cards with unique backs, making them ineligible for tournament play, and use a modern card frame instead of the classic frame from the original version.

In 2013, a high quality copy of the card was sold on eBay for $27,302. In 2021, a copy of the card signed by Rush sold for $511,100. In 2022, musician Post Malone, a fan of Magic, bought a signed artist's proof of the card for $800,000. In 2023, a copy of the card sold for $540,000. In 2024, previous records were broken when one sold for $3,000,000. In all instances, the cards had perfect grading scores.

Since the card's initial release, other cards with similar but weaker effects have been printed, such as Lotus Petal, which is functionally identical but provides one mana instead of three. A parody of the card named "Blacker Lotus" was printed in the 1998 comedy expansion set Unglued. Blacker Lotus provides four mana instead of three, but requires the player to tear it into pieces. A take on the card named "Jeweled Lotus" was made with a focus on the Commander format, providing three mana that can only be used to cast a commander card. However, this card is banned in the very format it was made for.

== See also ==
- List of most expensive CCG cards
