= King of Collectibles: The Goldin Touch =

- Genre: Reality television
- Starring: Ken Goldin, David Amerman
- No. of seasons: 3
- No. of episodes: 14

Original release
- Network: Netflix
- Release: April 28, 2023 – present

King of Collectibles: The Goldin Touch is an American reality television show following Ken Goldin and employees of his company Goldin Auctions that premiered on Netflix in 2023. The show reached No. 4 in the U.S. and No. 20 worldwide on Netflix during season 2. The third season released on the 23rd of December, 2025.

== Production ==
The first season was announced in March 2022 with Omaha Productions producing the show and Peyton Manning as executive producer. It premiered on Netflix on April 28, 2023. It was renewed for a second season in July 2023. The second season premiered on June 12, 2024. In July 2025, Netflix renewed King of Collectibles: The Goldin Touch for a third season.

== Episodes ==
Season	Episodes	Originally released
1	6	April 28, 2023
2	8	June 12, 2024
3	6	December 23, 2025

=== Season 1 (2023) ===
No. overall	No. in season	Title	Original release date
1	1	"Hail to the King"	April 28, 2023
2	2	"Number One or Bust"	April 28, 2023
3	3	"The Goldin Ticket"	April 28, 2023
4	4	"Puerto Richo"	April 28, 2023
5	5	"Dreams Do Come True"	April 28, 2023
6	6	"The Goldin Offer"	April 28, 2023

=== Season 2 (2024) ===
No. overall	No. in season	Title	Original release date
7	1	"Catch of a Lifetime"	June 12, 2024
8	2	"Rookie Moves"	June 12, 2024
9	3	"Million Dollar Marvel"	June 12, 2024
10	4	"All That Bling"	June 12, 2024
11	5	"King Con"	June 12, 2024
12	6	"A Titanic Task"	June 12, 2024
13	7	"A Messi Situation"	June 12, 2024
14	8	"The Pop Culture Auction"	June 12, 2024

=== Season 3 (2025) ===
No. overall	No. in season	Title	Original release date
15	1	"Chef's Kiss"	December 23, 2025
A Cheeto shaped as a Charizard is sold for a surprisingly high price at Goldin auctions.
16	2	"Chasing Pikachu"	December 23, 2025
Logan Paul makes another visit at Goldin auctions and brings his Pokémon Illustrator necklace.
17	3	"Mob Mentality"	December 23, 2025
18	4	"Ken-ichiwa!"	December 23, 2025
Ken Goldin makes a business trip to Japan.
19	5	"Lights, Camera, Auction"	December 23, 2025
A married couple hopes their valuable NFL card will sell for a sum high enough to enable them to fulfill their dreams.
20	6	"Billion Dollar Moves"	December 23, 2025
Ken Goldin is hoping to meet NBA star Giannis Antetokounmpo.

== Lawsuit ==
In April 2024, a lawsuit alleging the show infringed on Gervase Peterson's copyright for a show he pitched to Goldin titled The Goldin Boys in 2019 was dismissed by Judge Christine O'Hearn. O'Hearn found that any plot similarities between The Goldin Boys and King of Collectibles were scènes à faire and not protected by American copyright law.

== Recognition ==
King of Collectibles: The Goldin Touch was nominated for Best Business Show at the Critics Choice Real TV Awards in May 2025.

In 2024, the show received a nomination at the Daytime Emmy Awards, where a member of the cast participated as a presenter during the ceremony.
