= Magic: The Gathering Judge Program =

Program training and certifying TGC judges

The Magic: The Gathering Judge Program is an independent organization that trains, certifies, and manages Judges, the tournament officials who run tournaments of the trading card game Magic: The Gathering. The Judge Program was founded early in the game's history as part of the DCI, the game's original sanctioning body, but has since become an independent, peer-driven organization, selecting its own leadership. In 2019, Judge Academy LLC, took up responsibility for the program, this organization later disbanded in 2023 and Judge Foundry currently runs the Magic Judge program for the USA and Canada. Judge Foundry and the International Judges Program is not endorsed by WOTC. These programs are not required to be a judge and have no official recognition. Any store or tournament could hire anyone to be a “judge”

== History ==
The Judge Program has existed for almost as long as Magic: The Gathering itself. An organization called the DCI (a part of Wizards of the Coast, originally standing for Duelists Convocation International) was created to organize the competitive aspects of the game, and created the original tournament policy rules as well as the original five-level Judge system. At the time, this system was directly administered by the DCI and Wizards of the Coast, managing testing, performance reviews, and reports. Candidates would take an exam and be assigned a level from one to three based on their score. Levels 4 and 5 were more experienced or senior leaders, and were assigned by Wizards of the Coast. Candidates could attend a Pro Tour, work as a volunteer, and take the exam at the conclusion of the weekend.

Over time, the program has grown and changed. The program is now independently organized, with a three-level system, its own method for selecting leadership, and incorporating many of the functions that were previously run by the DCI. Judges now apply for events months in advance, and generally spend months or years judging events locally - independently or with a mentor - before being recruited to larger events such as Grand Prix and Pro Tours.

In 2019, at the behest of Wizards of the Coast, a new organization, Judge Academy, was founded to manage and operate the judge program into the future. Judges are now required to pay an annual membership fee. Initially fees were up to $400 a year (plus tax) to include twice-yearly shipments of judge promotional cards. Fees were waived in 2021 due to the COVID-19 pandemic From 2022, a flat fee of $75 per year was implemented, no longer including promotional cards. As of October 2023, Wizards of the Coast has ended its partnership with Judge Academy.

== Structure ==
The entire program consists of more than 6,000 active judges worldwide. Judges are certified once they successfully complete a series of pre-requisites and pass an exam. A similar process allows judges to reach a higher level.

Level 1 Judges are responsible for the majority of events worldwide, including most events at local stores. Over 4,000 judges are Level 1, and are certified to handle small events on their own, including knowledge both of the game rules and of how to resolve common mistakes. Level 2 Judges are also certified for more competitive events, such as events that qualify competitors on the path to the Pro Tour. They learn more advanced rules, as well as the penalties and fixes that are required to keep these more competitive events fair. Level 3 Judges are certified to judge all events, including taking on more difficult roles such as leading a team or head judging at a Grand Prix or Pro Tour. They are tested on leadership skills, more advanced investigation techniques, and their ability to train and evaluate other judges. Many Level 3 Judges also lead projects outside of events.

The Judge Program selects its own global and regional leadership. A group of Program Coordinators and Regional Coordinators is assigned based on an application process, and they are responsible for regions or projects within the Judge Program.

== Role in Organized Play ==
The Judge Program also maintains and interprets the policies in effect at Magic: the Gathering tournaments. With each quarterly release of a new product, the tournament policy is also updated. These updates include changes needed to support the new cards, as well as periodic changes to the interpretations or rulings given in certain scenarios. For example, in early 2019, an update was published which would allow players to "take back" decisions in certain situations. This was previously commonly allowed by judges as long as the game had not progressed too far, and this update codified the practice. As another example, a recent update updated the penalty for using an illegal method to end a match, such as rolling a die. Previously, this resulted in an automatic disqualification, now, players are only disqualified if they knew that what they were doing was against the rules.

Judges answer a variety of calls at a typical tournament, ranging from questions about rules interactions to cases involving complex investigations to determine how a game has progressed, and whether a competitor is lying or cheating. Most cases are resolved by the judge answering the question, or helping the competitors through a complex interaction. However, in extreme cases, players can receive penalties up to and including disqualification from the tournament. When this happens, the case is also referred to a specialized committee within the judge program called the Player Investigations Committee, which determines whether any further action, such as a suspension, is required.

== Recent events ==
=== Independent Contractor Classification ===
Judges have historically been classified as either independent contractors or as volunteers while working at events. In 2015 and 2016, two lawsuits were filed against Wizards of the Coast claiming that Judges should be considered employees of Wizards of the Coast while acting as judges. These claims were based around the Fair Labor Standards Act and similar legislation in the US state of California. Judges alleged that because their work was directed by and done to benefit Wizards of the Coast, that they should be considered employees and entitled to hourly wages, overtime pay, and similar benefits and protections. Wizards of the Coast replied that the judges in question were doing work for local game stores and regional tournament organizers, had no relationship with Wizards of the Coast, and that in any event, their participation in the judge program was voluntary. Both cases were settled prior to trial.

In response to these lawsuits and similar claims, Wizards of the Coast has taken steps to distance itself from the Judge Program and from similar community workers for other games, such as Dungeons & Dragons.
