= Magic: The Gathering Organized Play =

Magic: The Gathering Organized Play is the worldwide program for all levels of tournaments for the trading card game Magic: The Gathering. Created in 1993 by Wizards of the Coast, the Organized Play program has grown to host some of the largest trading card game tournaments ever, with hundreds of thousands of events each year. The vast majority of events are casual gaming events hosted at local stores, however, due to a common ranking system and set of rules and policies, these events ultimately feed players into the highest levels of play.

== Rankings ==
Until September 2011, Magic: The Gathering used a modified Elo rating system. Initially, there were separate categories for different formats of play, such as constructed and limited. Starting in 2010, a new category called Total was used. This rating was used for rating-based invitations and byes.

The rating system was discontinued in 2011 in favor of a points-based system, known as Planeswalker Points. This system awarded points for participating in a tournament, as well as additional points for each win during the event. This system replaced the rating system for invitations and byes. In 2020, Planeswalker Points were retired.

Additionally, there was a system of Pro Points called the Pro Tour Players' Club. This system awards points only for high level play, such as Pro Tours and especially good finishes at Grand Prix events. This system grants players certain privileges such as automatic invitations to Pro Tour events, appearance fees, and travel stipends. This program was discontinued at the end of 2019 in favor of the Magic Pro League.

== Rules and policies ==
All organized Magic: The Gathering events operate under a specific Rules Enforcement Level (REL): Regular, Competitive, or Professional. Most local events are Regular REL. Competitive REL events include Grand Prix events, and most events that are used to qualify for the Pro Tour. Professional REL is used for day 2 of Grand Prix events, Pro Tours, and Worlds. The game rules are the same at each level, however the tournament policy varies. For example, at Regular REL, most infractions are fixed informally, with a Judge returning the game to the correct state. At Competitive events, most infractions result in a Warning or more serious penalty, and such Warnings are tracked in order to identify patterns of misbehavior that could be a sign of Cheating.

These policies are developed by the Magic: The Gathering Judge Program in consultation with Wizards of the Coast, and are typically updated quarterly.

== Selected event types ==
=== Regular REL ===
==== Friday Night Magic ====
Friday Night Magic, commonly abbreviated as FNM, is a weekly event run by most local game stores. Stores have the option of running FNM using any legal format, and stores with sufficient demand can run multiple events. This event is intended to be a friendly entry point for new players, with the focus on creating a fun play environment, and educating players rather than assigning penalties for rules violations.

==== Prerelease ====
Prerelease is the first event where cards from an upcoming set are legal. Scheduled the weekend before release weekend, it is a sealed event, either for individual players or for teams of two using the Two-Headed Giant format. It is a casual event, and organizers are encouraged to use a flat prize structure - one where most players receive at least some prizes, rather than one where most prizes go to the top finishers. This is intended to provide a better customer experience to more players, and to avoid the need for a time-consuming Top 8 playoff at this casual event. This is especially important because most organizers will run 6 prerelease events over the course of prerelease weekend, running from Friday afternoon through Sunday evening.

For most of the event's history, the events were allowed starting at midnight Saturday morning. Starting in 2019, stores were allowed to start their events Friday afternoon instead, providing more flexible scheduling options to many stores.

=== Competitive and Professional REL ===
==== Mythic Championship ====

The Mythic Championship, known as the Pro Tour until 2019, is the highest level of Organized Play for most competitors. They are hosted four times per year, once for each set release. They are invitation only, and players can earn an invitation either by having a required level in the Pro Tour Players' Club, placing at a high enough level in a Grand Prix, or winning a Qualifier event. Until 2014, the qualifier tournaments were referred to as Pro Tour Qualifiers. In 2014, a two-stage system was rolled out in which players first had to win a Preliminary Pro Tour Qualifier at their local game store, and then place high enough in the Regional Pro Tour Qualifier, in order to earn an invitation. In 2019, the PPTQ/RPTQ system was discontinued and returned to a single stage system, now called Mythic Championship Qualifiers. MCQs are hosted around the world by local organizers, as well as one per day at every MagicFest weekend.

Attending a Mythic Championship is an achievement for most competitive Magic players'. Top level players are ranked based on how many times they have finished in the Top 8 (making it to the single-elimination playoffs), as well as how many wins they have. Currently, each Pro Tour carries a total purse of $250,000 [US], with the winner receiving $40,000 [US] (the exact payout varies by player's final standing). Other benefits to top finishers include invitations to future Pro Tours, with the highest-ranking players over the course of several Pro Tour events receiving additional prize money for travel and participation.

==== World Championship ====

World Championships are held every year after the end of the season. The 24 most successful players, determined by a handful of metrics are invited to compete for the title. The formats have varied from year to year, but they always include at least one Constructed and one Limited format. The tournament takes three days with the first two days open to all competitors. On the final day the best four players play a semi-final and final for the title. Since 2012, the World Championships have usually been held in late summer, most recently in September 2018 in Las Vegas.

==== Grand Prix ====

Grand Prix tournaments are open to everyone, both amateurs and professionals. The prize pool is not as large as for a Pro Tour and winning a Grand Prix is not as prestigious, however, they still attract international competition, since Pro Points, as well as cash prizes, are awarded to high finishing players. Additionally, a first-place finish at a Grand Prix qualifies a player to attend a future Pro Tour. These events last two days (Saturday and Sunday); generally, but not always, small events and tournaments to award byes for the main event happen on the preceding Friday. The main event begins Saturday, with all players losing two or fewer matches progressing to compete on the second day. Sunday culminates in the top 8 players competing for successively larger amounts of cash. The Grand Prix tournaments are held around the world. Each tournament is preceded by Grand Prix Trials held in the country of the Grand Prix as well as other nearby countries, which grant the top players at the event a three-round bye.

Uniquely among major Magic events, Grand Prix tournaments allow certain players the right to skip the first one, two, or three rounds and obtain full points as though they had won those rounds. This is described as "awarded byes". A player having a high DCI rating, any level in the Pro Players Club, or a top performer in a Grand Prix Trial may be awarded a one-round, two-round, or three-round bye.
