= Magic: The Gathering finance =

Financial management and investment of Magic: The Gathering cards

Magic: The Gathering finance or MtG finance is the financial management and investment as they pertain to the collectibility and playability of the Magic: The Gathering collectible card game. Investments are typically made in single cards whose value is expected to rise over time, such as from a shifting metagame or low quantities of cards that may or may not increase in value due to a growing playerbase and its demand. The most expensive Magic: The Gathering cards are among the most expensive CCG cards.

Like the stock market, cards are generally bought at a low price and/or are sold at a higher price during peak demand at a later date. Speculation is common as investors seek to predict which of 20,000+ unique cards will avoid a reprint thereby creating more demand. Speculation also occurs in the selling of card assets when a reprint is expected in an effort to maximize financial gain and minimize loss. Most financing is done through the buying and selling of cards, though some investors have traded their way to cards of higher value, or expected to gain value in the future. Additionally, some speculators have gone as far as manipulating the market by buying up large quantities of a single card in order to artificially inflate a card's price.

Investments may also go beyond the acquirement of individual cards and may include booster boxes and packs or other unopened game products, complete card sets, or even original artwork featured in the game.

== Price memory ==
Price memory is the perceived value in a card based on historical prices, especially for popular cards. Even when a card is reprinted or banned, cards may retain some of their value despite indications suggesting its price should decrease. Usually this occurs because players generally hold on to their card collections regardless of its current status. Price memory may also mean that a specific card will lose its value slowly rather than suddenly.

== Reprint equity ==
Speculators have identified a phenomenon known as reprint equity, which is the amount of in-demand cards that have not been reprinted, or those cards not having a reprint after a substantial period of time. The rate at which Wizards of the Coast reprints cards affects the equity of cards without reprints. Investors have noted that in recent years equity has decreased with a surge in new products, such as the Modern Masters line. A potential avenue for increasing equity is the unbanning of cards in specific formats to increase demand and its value.

== Card Grading ==
Another factor of card prices is the quality of the card itself. On the large online market, cards are sorted into Near Mint (NM), Lightly played (LP), Moderately Played (MP), Heavily Played (HP), and Damaged (D). Near Mint being the best maintained condition, Damaged being the worst. Overall this grading system applies to every card sold, no matter how little the price. The majority of sellers use their best judgement, and unless there is a buyer issue, this general trust grading system has been a staple of Magic.

A card grading system people might be more used to especially after increased popularity of collecting Pokemon cards, is the PSA grading system. On a 10 point grading system, collectors will get their cards meticulously graded in order to increase their value on the market. This service needs to be paid for, typically shipping out your cards to larger companies. Comparatively the online simple card grading system is free for everyone, and sellers self grade to the best of their ability. The PSA grading system has been heavily attractive to collectors, but is mainly used for specific high value cards where the return on paying for the grading service outweighs the cost.

== Observer and bandwagon effects ==
The observer effect has been a tool implemented by speculators in an effort to manipulate the card market. It asserts that "you can't measure something without affecting the results of that measurement". An example of this in MTG finance would be suggesting a certain card has unrecognized value in a public forum and having the public respond to that advice by buying that card. This would seem to prove the original advice correct as determined by the subsequent price increase of that card and is known as the bandwagon effect.

Price speculation and the bandwagon effect can be shown within the case of Splinter Twin. A deck built around this card once was the best in the modern format, from which it would later be banned from in January 2016, after dominating the previous year. Since then the modern format has evolved a lot, following the trends of power creep. Splinter Twin was finally unbanned in December of 2024 but has not seen any real competitive play. Yet in this 8 year stretch, anytime there was a large planned modern ban update Splinter Twins price would spike right before hand, then fall just after the announcement. This can be seen on March 9th 2020, July 13th 2020, and August 7th 2023.

The 3 large spikes fall exactly on those dates, with the prices falling just shortly after. The reason for this price speculation not occurring previously to 2020, while the card was still banned for 4 long years is due to the unprecedented act of unbanning cards. Wizards of the Coast in 2018 for the first time in Modern history, unbanned strong staples of the old format outside of the initial modern ban list. Later in 2019 they unbanned another card from Worldwake, the dominant Stoneforge Mystic. Since then speculation pricing has become much more popular, players attempting to get ahead of announcements, reading the meta and buying up card availability driving prices up. Hence why Splinter Twin has had large price increases when many buyers have their attention on the card, despite the card not being great at all, nor was it even unbanned within this 5 year speculatory period. The card’s price once again increased by 250% after the unban due to the market being bought up, and has fallen since December, with it not slotting into the new much more powerful meta.

== Cards and formats ==
=== Reserved list ===
The reserved list is a finite list of cards that Wizards of the Coast has promised never to reprint again specifically to retain their value on the secondary market due to customer complaints. Two exceptions were made with revisions to the list in 2002 and 2010. The list includes cards from the earliest Magic expansions. Because a promise has been made to never reprint these cards, their value is expected to rise over time and have frequently been the target of speculators. In 2022, they reprinted cards from the reserved list using a different back, raising investor concerns about Hasbro's management of the brand.

=== Premium cards ===
Premium cards, also known as foils, are often a target of investment due to their increased rarity, especially those from earlier expansions. This can be exacerbated if the premium card is also on the reserved list.

=== Counterfeits ===
Another issue that has been a frequent topic in the uncertainty of MtG finance are counterfeits. As individual card prices rise, Wizards of the Coast's promise not to reprint cards from the reserved list, and cards not being reprinted to demand, counterfeiters have filled this demand and are getting better with each passing year. In 2015, Wizards of the Coast implemented more anti-counterfeit measures by introducing a holographic foil onto cards with specific rarities, in addition to creating a proprietary font.

=== Commander ===
The multiplayer format Commander is a popular target of speculation for many reasons. The game as a whole has far more casual than tournament players and their currently preferred format is Commander. Because Commander also utilizes the entire library of Magic cards and has few banned cards, it becomes ideal for speculation, often relying on the casual player's unfamiliarity with Magic finance as a whole or potential metagames involving future Commander cards. Websites such as EDHREC are used to ascertain the frequency a card is used, cross-referencing that card with available inventories, and then making a possible speculation.

Dockside Extortionist was originally printed in a commander sealed product, and at its release as a single it was priced at around $5. Now post 2020, the commander format saw a rise in popularity, but especially its more competitive sub format known as CEDH, or Competitive EDH. (EDH is a common term for commander referring to when the format first started under the name Elder Dragon Highlander). Dockside quickly became a staple of the much more competitive format and its price reflected this rising all the up to a consistent $70. Interestingly, there was a reprint in the summer of 2022, as seen with the small price dip. Yet the price did feel the reprint for long as the demand for this commander staple kept this card at a very expensive price. Mid 2024 there was a controversial banning that occurred that removed many competitive commander staples causing dockside to crash. Dockside has always been a strong card, yet it was popularity of the format that was halting its value.

Another card caught in this CEDH ban was Jeweled Lotus. Although commander cards are legal in eternal formats, Jeweled Lotus is unplayable outside of the commander format but due to its power at its peak it averaged $110. Yet despite the ban the card floats at $75. Additionally when banned it did not have an immediate fall off of price level. The intricate part of the commander format is how it can be played at a casual level, as personal playgroups write their own rules for how they wish to play. Jeweled Lotus, being such an expensive staple of the format, had many people still playing it after the ban, and therefore it held its market value.

Both Dockside and Jeweled Lotus were both subject to price speculation as well when they announced commander ban list updates early in 2025. They still hold value due to specifically how commander as a format does not need to follow the banlist as strictly as the rest of Magic. After these specific bans in the commander format there was a large community movement to question if commander required a banlist at all, the community being quick to self regulate the power level of their games.

Commander is considered to be one of the most popular format played in Magic the Gathering. Many cards fall under the price speculation of the commander format. Additionally commander products are Wizards of the Coast's best performing MTG products, outselling Pokemon and other TCGS within the same year.

=== Modern and Standard formats ===
The utility of cards in the metagame of specific game formats, such as Modern and Standard, either through banning, unbanning, or rotation of legal cards, has been a target for speculators. The cards that see frequent tournament play retain a higher value. Cards like these, or the cards they interact with, also known as the domino effect, are speculated on usually before they become a staple of the metagame.

== See also ==
- Digital collectible card game
- List of collectible card games
- List of digital collectible card games
- List of most expensive CCG cards
