= Christopher Rush (illustrator) =

American illustrator for Magic: The Gathering

- Born: April 6, 1965; Long Beach, California, United States
- Died: February 10, 2016 (aged 50); Marathon, Florida, United States
- Known for: Fantasy illustration
- Notable work: Power Nine, among other Magic: The Gathering works
- Children: Sierra Troi Rush; Madeline Arabella Rush
- Website: www.angelfire.com/scifi2/crushart/

Christopher Rush (April 6, 1965 – February 10, 2016) was an American illustrator for Magic: The Gathering. In total, he illustrated over 100 cards for the series, including the most expensive card in the game, the Black Lotus. Most of his work for Wizards of the Coast was done on the earliest sets, where he also helped with various design and marketing issues, including the design of the symbols representing the 5 colors of mana.

While the Pokémon TCG was still run by Wizards, Rush did the illustration for Promo Mewtwo #12, which was released in the April 2000 issue of Nintendo Power. He was the first artist from outside Japan to have illustrated a Pokémon card, and remains one of the few.

While working on art for Wizards of the Coast, Rush also worked as a Game Play Counselor at Nintendo of America in Redmond, Washington. He later continued to do freelance work, illustrating cards for various games and concept art for computer games and television.

Rush died on February 10, 2016, one day after fellow Magic: The Gathering artist Wayne England. Rush was 50 years old.
