= Unglued =

Magic: The Gathering expansion set

- cracked-open egg
- Released: August 1998
- Size: 94 cards
- Keywords: Denimwalk
- Mechanics: Tearing; Player Enchantment; Opponent Manipulation; Dice Rolling & Coin Flipping; Extra game effects
- Development code: Wacky Set
- Expansion code: UGL
← Portal Second Age	Urza's Saga →

Unglued is a Magic: The Gathering expansion set, the first satirical, non-tournament-legal expansion set released. It came out in August 1998. Its symbol is a cracked egg. Among the themes of the set were chicken, dice rolling and multiplayer Magic games.

== History ==
Unglued was originally conceived by then-lead Magic designer Joel Mick and fellow designer Bill Rose. Having helped in the creation of many of the expansion sets of the time, they began talking about cards which were cut from the expansion or were unplayable, based on the rules of the game. Thinking this through, they conceptualized an expansion where all the cards had no place in serious games.

As of May 2025, the three most valuable Unglued cards on TCGPlayer are: 1. Blacker Lotus, 2. Squirrel Token, and 3. Ashnod's Coupon. The set also developed a cult following among casual Magic fans, and four sequel sets have been released since, Unhinged in 2004, Unstable in 2017, Unsanctioned in 2020, and Unfinity in 2022.

== Secret message ==
Each of the 94 cards in the Unglued set had a single word printed on the bottom of the card. When combined in proper numerical order with other cards in the series, the following message is revealed:

"Here are some cards that didn't make it to print: Socks of Garfield, Hot Monkey Love, Colonel's Secret Recipe, Squee's Play, Banned in France, Spoon, Disrobing Scepter, Butt Wolf, Lotus Roach, Sesame Efreet, Needless Reminder Text, Chicken Choker, Clockwork Doppelganger, Henway, HELP I'M TRAPPED IN CARTA MUNDI, Mad Cow, Poke, Lord of Wombats, Gratuitous Babe Art, Brothers' War Bonds, Dwarven Kickboxer, Mickey's Drunk, Pact with the Wastes, CoP:BO, Urza's Chia Pet, Thallid Shooter, Shoelace, When Chihuahuas Attack, Wall of Cookies, Kobold Ninja, Mucusaur, Kjeldoran Outhouse, Bear in the Woods, Dental Thrull, Flavatog, Cereal Killer."

== Flavor Text ==
The flavor texts of the cards Double Dip, Double Play, Double Deal, Double Take, and Double Cross form the following limerick:

In a duel and taking a lickin'...
The wizard exclaimed, "I'm no chicken...."
"I'm facing defeat,..."
"But the next time we meet,..."
"You're in for a nasty butt kickin'."

Which fit the mechanics of the cards, as all five not only did something for the player when played, but also created a benefit for the player during their next game against the same opponent.
