= Unstable (Magic: The Gathering) =

Magic: The Gathering expansion set

- Wrench with inscribed acorn
- Released: December 8, 2017
- Size: approximately 216 cards
- Keywords: Last strike, Squirrellink, Augment
- Mechanics: Contraptions, high fives, Factions, die rolls
- Development code: Quicksilver
- Expansion code: UST

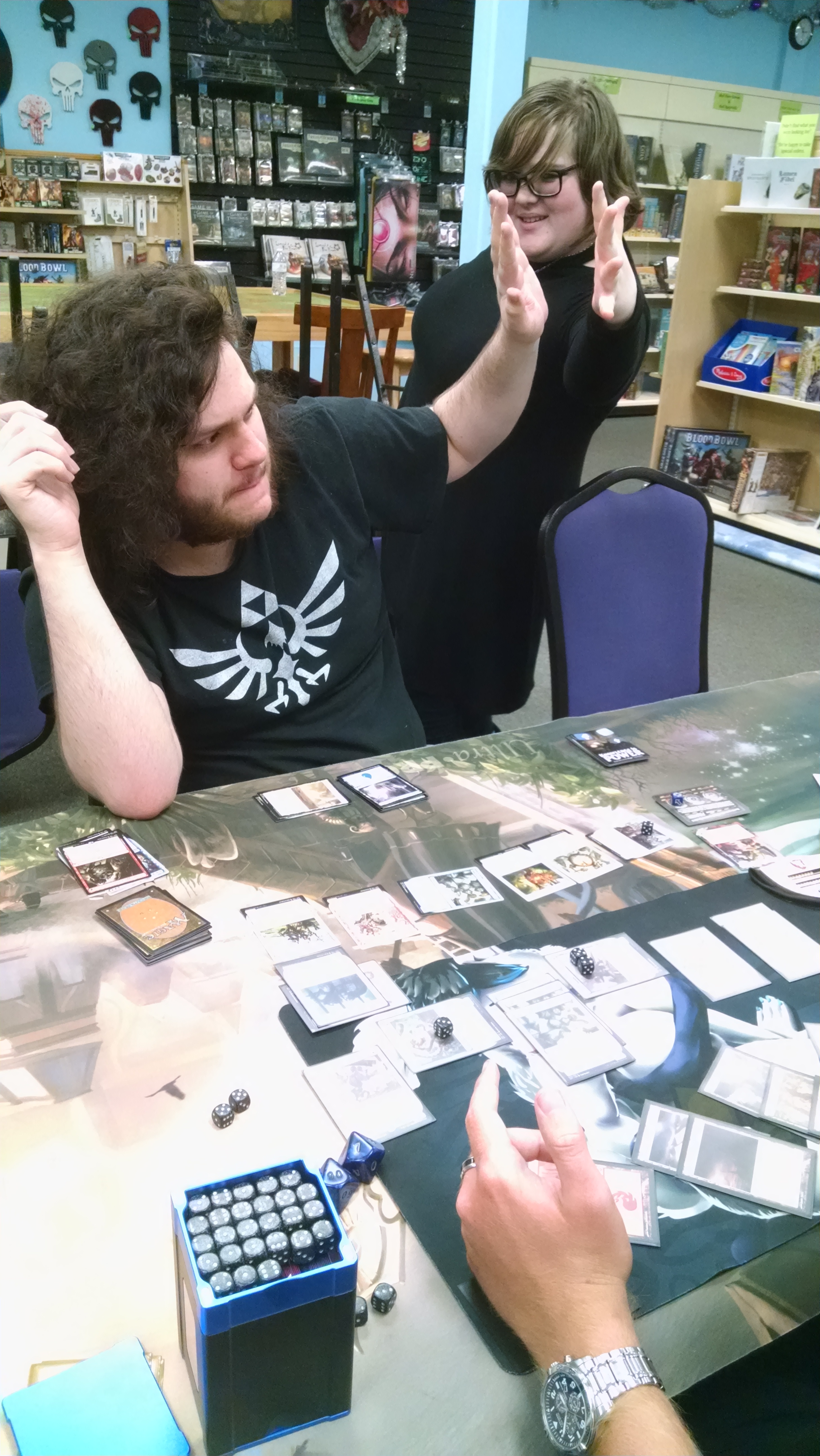
Two players engaged in a high five during a midnight release draft of the Unstable expansion on December 8, 2017.

Unstable is an official parody expansion set to the collectible card game Magic: The Gathering that was released on December 8, 2017. It is the third set of its kind, featuring silver borders, following in the tradition of 1998's Unglued and 2004's Unhinged.

== Flavor and background ==
Unstable takes place on Bablovia, a steampunk-inspired plane. It features five main factions, one for each allied color pairing: The Order of the Widget (white-blue), the Agents of S.N.E.A.K. (blue-black), the League of Dastardly Doom (black-red), the Goblin Explosioneers (red-green) and the Crossbreed Labs (green-white).

== Mechanics ==
Unstable features interactions with "Host" creatures via the "Augment" mechanic. Certain creatures have the supertype "Host" and feature an effect that triggers when they enter the battlefield. Other creatures have the "Augment" ability and can only be played on top of a Host creature. When this is done, the Augment creature replaces the "when this creature enters the battlefield" trigger with a different trigger, making the Host's mechanic repeatable in some way. The art and card frames for Host and Augment creatures are designed such that the Augment creature can visually replace the front half of the Host creature, turning the composite creature into a hybrid.

Another major Unstable mechanic involves Sprockets and Contraptions. These are the culmination of a card first printed in Future Sight, the future-shifted "Steamflogger Boss." At the time of its 2007 Future Sight printing, Steamflogger Boss referenced "Riggers" and Contraptions, which were not referred to by any other cards or rules in all of Magic. Unstable finally defined them. Contraptions are artifacts that reside in a special Contraption deck consisting of no more than 15 cards. "Assembling" one puts it on the battlefield. All Contraptions have a reverse face, instead of the standard Magic: the Gathering card back, depicting three sprockets. Any assembled Contraption must be assigned to one of these sprockets of its controller's choice at the time of assembly. At the beginning of a player's upkeep, that player may "crank" (activate) any Contraptions associated with one sprocket. The sprockets are selected in sequence (third, first, second, third, and so on), such that the player cannot choose which sprocket will activate at will.

== Constructed format legality ==
Silver-bordered cards had never been legal in any constructed play formats before Unstable. One week before its release, the EDH Rules Committee announced that all silver-bordered cards, except a short list of banned cards, would be officially legal for play in the Commander format for a limited time, until January 15, 2018.

== Basic lands ==
Like Unglued and Unhinged, Unstable contains the five main basic lands of Magic with expanded, vertically oriented artwork. All five basic lands in Unstable were illustrated by John Avon and feature artwork which stretches all the way to the edge of the cards, with no borders at all. These lands command significantly higher prices on the secondary market than normal basic land cards from other expansions, although they perform the same function in the game.
