= Ken Goldin =

American entrepreneur (born 1965)

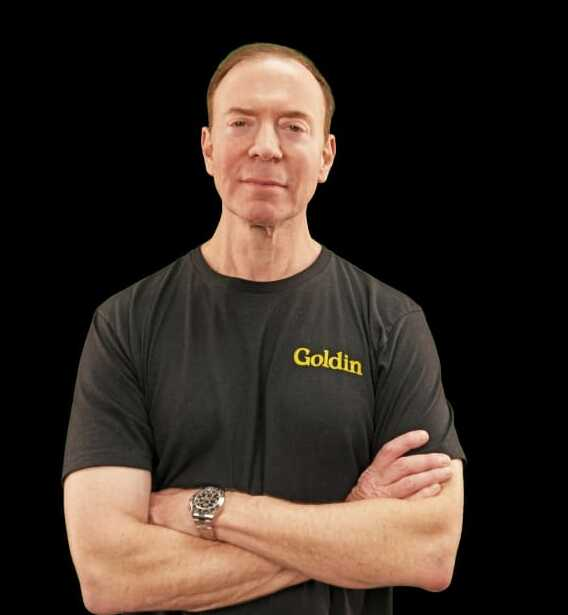
- Goldin in 2024
- Born: Kenneth Goldin; August 18, 1965 (age 60); Philadelphia, U.S.
- Occupations: Businessman; Reality television personality
- Years active: 1986–present
- Known for: King of Collectibles: The Goldin Touch, Goldin Auctions
- Website: goldin.co

Kenneth Goldin (born August 18, 1965) is an American auctioneer, television personality, and sports card collector. He has sold over $2 billion in memorabilia related to sports, history, and pop culture in his career, including through his company, Goldin Auctions. He is featured on the Netflix TV series King of Collectibles: The Goldin Touch.

== Early life and career ==
Goldin was born in Philadelphia and grew up in Cherry Hill, New Jersey. He grew up as a fan of the Philadelphia Phillies of Major League Baseball and began collecting baseball cards. He began selling them in 1978. His parents, Paul Goldin and Carole Goldin, supported his passion for collectibles. His sister, Sharon Goldin, shares his interest in this field. Goldin graduated from Friends Select School in Philadelphia, earned a Bachelor of Business Administration from Drexel University, and pursued a marketing degree at George Washington University School of Business.

In 1985, in a trial overseen by Maryanne Barry, Goldin pleaded guilty to wire fraud after using credit card numbers he had fraudulently obtained by rummaging through garbage in order to play the MegaWars online game at a cost of up to $12 an hour. He was sentenced to three years of probation and ordered to pay a $500 fine and $3,750 in restitution to CompuServe, the game's provider; he could have faced five years in prison and fines of $250,000.

Goldin formed The Score Board, Inc., with his father in 1986, which became known for creating the classic brand of trading cards. They also signed athletes to exclusive autograph contracts. The company went public in 1987 and made $1 million in sales. They sold $20 million in 1989. Goldin left The Score Board in 1997 and, from 1998 to 2011, supplied sports collectibles to TV shopping outlets like QVC and HSN.

Goldin has been a regular guest on national television channels such as Fox Business, CNBC, Bloomberg TV, and ESPN, where he discusses trends and insights in the collectibles industry. Goldin has sold more than $2 billion worth of collectibles, including sports memorabilia and historical artifacts, throughout his career. Goldin has shared in interviews some of his most surprising sales, such as a Michael Jordan patch card valued at ~$1.9 million, and Erling Haaland’s rookie soccer card selling for over $100,000.

In August 2025, Goldin stated that he is expanding his hobby reach and set a goal of US$10 million in modern card sales for a single card.

== Goldin Auctions ==
In 2012, Goldin established Goldin Auctions. The company became worth $102 million in 2020. In May 2024, his company was purchased by eBay; he continues to operate it as founder and CEO.

In June 2025, Goldin Auctions acquired Studio Auctions, a rare movie props auction house, in order to expand its offerings into Hollywood / entertainment memorabilia. Goldin Auctions staged its first major public showcase in Japan, bringing high-end sports memorabilia for collectors.

His Netflix show King of Collectibles: The Goldin Touch debuted on Netflix on April 28, 2023. It was renewed for a second season, which debuted on June 12, 2024. The show peaked at No. 4 in the United States and No. 20 worldwide.

== Philanthropy ==
Goldin serves as the Chairman of the Camcare Charitable Foundation. Through this role, he supports various community initiatives and projects aimed at making a positive impact.

As a member of the Philadelphia Museum of Sports' Board of Directors, Goldin contributes to preserving sports history and promoting education through exhibits and programs.

In August 2025, Goldin put up for auction a bat signed by a viral Little Leaguer from Haddonfield, New Jersey, with all proceeds donated to the Haddonfield Little League.
