= Magic Workstation =

Collectible card game manager

Magic Workstation (or MWS) is a program created by Magi-Soft that assists in playing Magic: The Gathering and other card games over the Internet and maintains a searchable database of Magic cards.

Users of the free version of the game start with a card set taken from a might and magic mini game.

== Program Interface ==
The program offers a feature through which the player can customize his own theme while playing the game. Themes usually change the appearance of the virtual desktop, card borders, text, and avatars.

== Limited Formats and Tournament Play ==
Magic Workstation features a built-in sealed deck generator. However, this generator is flawed as players have no way of knowing whether the decks being played were indeed built from the randomly generated cardpool. Thus sites which host MWS limited tournaments make players build their decks online, and use a security code which will change with any contents of the deck. This precaution helps prevent any dishonest play in a limited game, so long as both players ensure that their opponent's code is valid.

== See also ==
- Magic: The Gathering Online
- Apprentice (software)
