= Magic: The Gathering =

Collectible card game

- Logo since 2017

- Magic card back
- Designer: Richard Garfield
- Publisher: Wizards of the Coast
- Release date: August 5, 1993; 33 years ago
- Type: Collectible
- Players: 2 or more
- Skills: Card playing; Basic arithmetic; Reading
- Age range: 13+
- Chance: Some (order of cards drawn, varying card abilities)
- Website: magic.wizards.com

Magic: The Gathering (colloquially known as Magic or MTG) is a collectible, tabletop, and digital collectible card game created by Richard Garfield. It was released by Wizards of the Coast in 1993 as the company's first trading card game. From 2008 to 2016, over twenty billion Magic cards were printed as the game grew in popularity. For the 2022 fiscal year, Hasbro—the parent company of Wizards of the Coast—announced that Magic had generated $1 billion in annual revenue. By 2023, Magic had amassed approximately fifty million players worldwide. (Note: Attributed to multiple references:)

Players battle each other with the goal of reducing their opponent's life total to zero. To start, players draw seven cards from their own shuffled deck. Then, they take turns playing lands, resource cards that provide mana, and casting spells which cost mana to play. Typically, a player will cast a combination of creature spells (or other permanent spells such as artifacts or enchantments) which will stay on the board, and instant or sorcery spells which provide one time effects. Creatures provide a variety of advantages: they can attack the opposing player to inflict damage, defend against the opponent's creatures, or provide mana or other benefits.

A player's strategy is often informed by the kind of cards in their deck. As there are tens of thousands of different cards, this allows for many different styles of play. Games are often played in either a best of one or best of three format. In the latter case, after a round ends, players shuffle all of their cards back into their deck before beginning a new round.

Although the original concept of the game drew heavily from the motifs of traditional fantasy role-playing games such as Dungeons & Dragons, the gameplay bears little similarity to tabletop role-playing games, while simultaneously having substantially more cards and more complex rules than many other card games.

Magic can be played by two or more players, either in person with paper cards or on a computer, smartphone, or tablet with virtual cards through Internet-based software such as Magic: The Gathering Online, Magic: The Gathering Arena, Magic Duels and several others. It can be played in various rule formats, which fall into two categories: constructed and limited. Limited formats involve players creating a deck spontaneously out of a pool of random cards typically with a minimum deck size of 40 cards. In constructed formats, players create decks from cards they own, usually with a minimum of 60 cards per deck.

New cards are released on a regular basis through expansion sets. Further developments include the Wizards Play Network played at the international level and the worldwide community Players Tour, as well as a substantial resale market for Magic cards. Certain cards can be valuable due to their rarity in production and utility in gameplay, with prices ranging from a few cents to millions of dollars.

== Gameplay ==
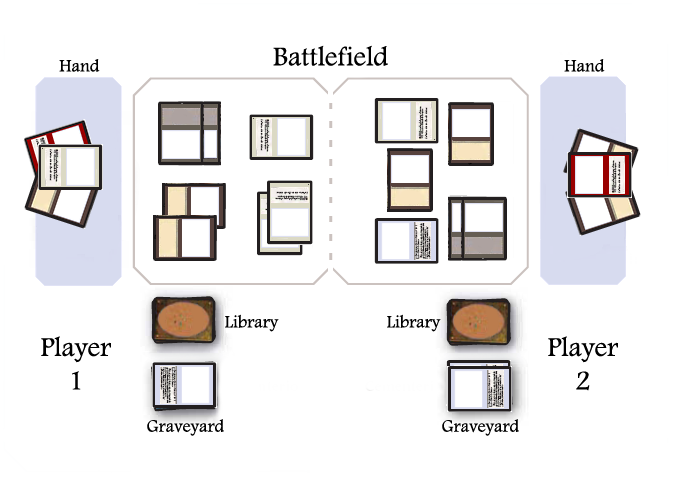
Magic: The Gathering zones

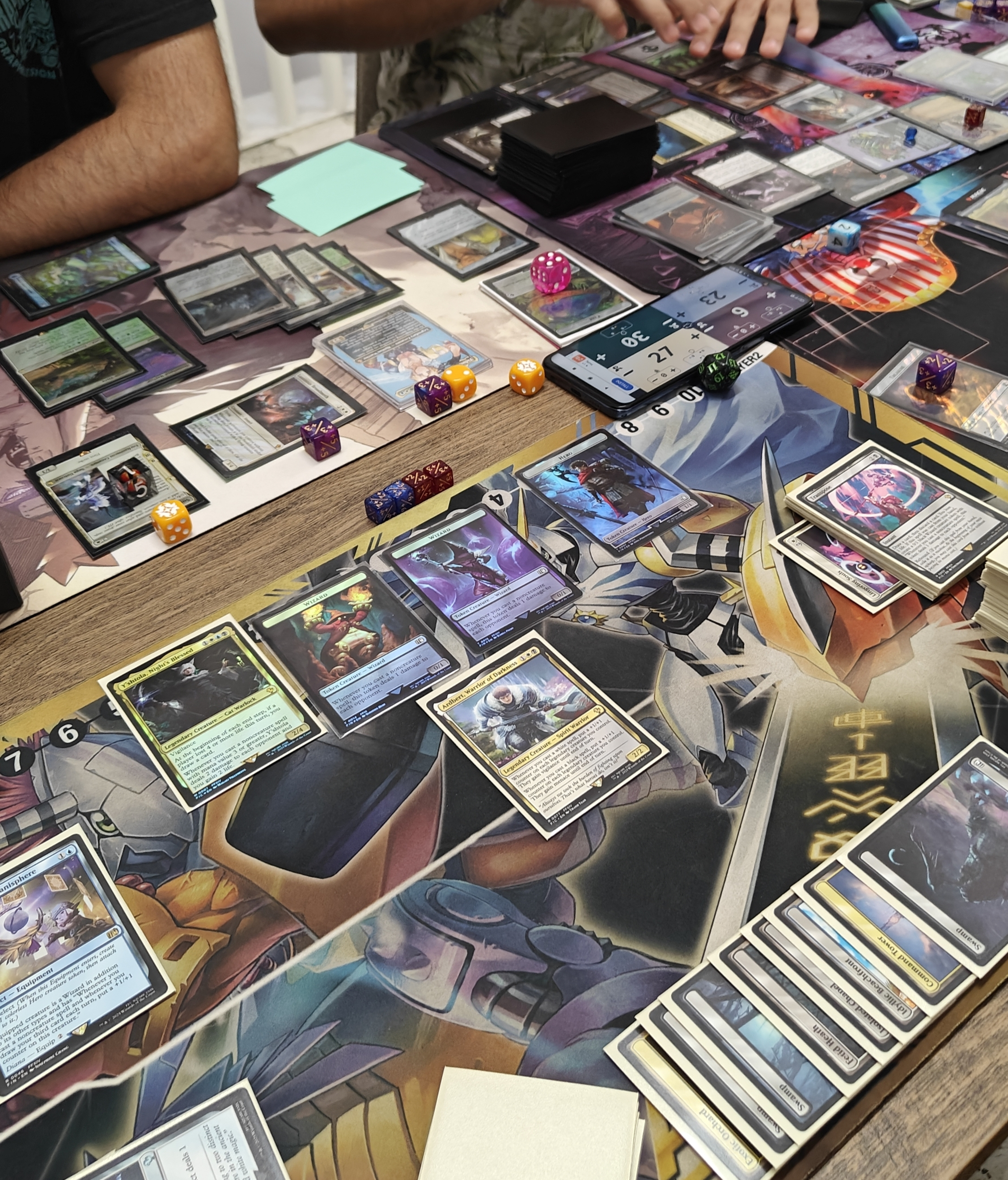
A game of Magic in progress

A typical game of Magic involves two or more players who are engaged in a battle, acting as powerful wizards known as Planeswalkers. Each player has their own deck of cards, purchased and constructed from a limited pool of available cards. A player typically starts the game with a "life total" of twenty and loses the game when the total is reduced to zero. A player can also lose the game if they try to draw from an empty deck. Some cards specify other ways to win or lose the game. One of the "Magic Golden Rules" is: "Whenever a card's text directly contradicts these rules, the card takes precedence". According to CNET, the game has many variants; "Magic tends to embrace all that house ruling, making it official when it catches on. Commander started as a fan-created format, after all."

Cards in Magic: The Gathering generally have a consistent format, with half of the face of the card showing the card's art, and the other half listing the card's mechanics, often relying on commonly-reused keywords to simplify the card's text. Cards fall into two classes: lands and spells. Lands produce mana, or magical energy. Players usually can only play one land card per turn, with most lands providing a specific color of mana when they are "tapped" (rotating the card 90 degrees). Each land can be tapped for mana only once per turn.

Spells consume mana, usually requiring at least one mana of a specific color. More powerful spells require larger amounts and more specific combinations of mana. As the game progresses and more lands enter play, the available mana increases, allowing stronger spells to be cast. Spells come in several varieties: "sorceries" and "instants" have a single, one-time effect before they go to the "graveyard" (discard pile); "enchantments" and "artifacts" that remain in play after being cast to provide a lasting magical effect; "creature" spells summon creatures that can attack and damage an opponent as well as used to defend from the opponent's creature attacks; and "planeswalker" spells that summon powerful allies that act similarly to other players. Lands, enchantments, artifacts, creatures, planeswalkers, and battle cards are considered "permanents" as they remain in play until removed by other spells, ability, or combat effects.

Players begin the game by shuffling their decks and then drawing seven cards. On each player's turn, following a set phase order, they draw a card, tap their lands and other permanents as necessary to gain mana to cast spells, engage their creatures in a single attack round against their opponent who may use their own creatures to block the attack, and then complete other actions with any remaining mana. Most actions that a player can perform enter the "Stack", a concept similar to the stack in computer programming. The stack follows Last in First Out order, where the last card played onto the stack is the first card effect resolved. Either player can react to these actions with other actions, such as countering an opponent's spells, removing an opponent's creature, and/or protecting their own. The stack provides a method of resolving complex interactions that may result in certain scenarios.

=== Deck construction ===
Dissection of a Magic: The Gathering card

Deck construction requires strategy; players must choose cards to play from thousands of options, requiring players to evaluate the power of their cards, the possible synergies between them, and their possible interactions with the cards they expect to play against. This "metagame" can vary by location and time period. The player restricts the choice of cards by deciding which colors to include in the deck. Starter decks, which are part of the Magic product line, are aimed at giving novice players ideas for deck construction. Players expand their card library for deck construction through booster packs, which have a random distribution of cards from a specific Magic set and are defined by rarity. These rarities are known as Common, Uncommon, Rare, and Mythic Rare; more powerful cards are generally more rare.

Most sanctioned games for Magic: The Gathering under the Wizards Play Network (WPN) use a Constructed format that require players to create their decks from their own library of cards. In general, this requires a minimum of sixty cards in the deck, and, except for basic land cards and cards that have text superseding this rule, no more than four cards of the same named card. The Standard format, by including mostly recently released cards, helps to prevent "power creep" that can be difficult to predict with the size of the Magic card library and help give newer players a fair advantage with long-term players. Other Constructed formats exist that allow for use of older expansions to give more variety for decks. A large variety of formats have been defined by the WPN which allows different pools of expansions to be used or alter deck construction rules for special events.

Commander is a 100-card constructed format that makes many changes to typical deck construction rules. In Commander, each of the one hundred cards must be uniquely named, excluding basic land cards. (Note: There are also a relatively small number of cards with text allowing them to supersede this rule.) Each player must also denote a legendary creature to be their Commander, which is able to be played at any time, without needing to draw it. All other cards in the deck must share their color with the commander. Additionally, Commander also allows any cards from any set release to be used, excluding any specific cards that have been banned from play and most cards from parody sets. Commander as a format has a separate ban list than other Constructed formats.

In Limited formats, a small number of cards are opened for play from booster packs or tournament packs, and generally a minimum deck size of forty cards is enforced. One of the most popular limited formats is Booster Draft, in which players open a booster pack, choose a card from it, and pass it to the player seated next to them. This continues until all the cards have been picked, and then a new pack is opened. Three packs are opened in total, and the direction of passing alternates left-right-left. Once the draft is done, players create decks out of the cards they picked, basic land cards being provided for free, and play games with the players they drafted with.

==== Limitations ====
In the event individual cards are listed as "restricted", only one copy can be included in a deck; other cards are "banned" at WPN's discretion. These restrictions are usually imposed for balance-of-power reasons but have been occasionally made because of gameplay mechanics. For example, with the elimination of the "play for ante" mechanic in all formal formats, all cards with this feature were banned. During the COVID-19 pandemic, which drew more players to the online Magic games and generated volumes of data of popular deck constructions, Wizards of the Coast was able to track popular combinations more quickly than in a purely paper game, and in mid-2020, the company banned additional cards that in specific combinations could draw out games far longer than desired.

Wizards of the Coast has banned some old cards from all formal play due to inappropriate racial or cultural depictions in their text or illustrations in the wake of the George Floyd protests, and their images have been blocked or removed from online Magic databases. This includes a card called "Invoke Prejudice", which was displayed on the official card-index site Gatherer "at a web URL ending in '1488', numbers that are synonymous with white supremacy".

=== Colors of Magic ===
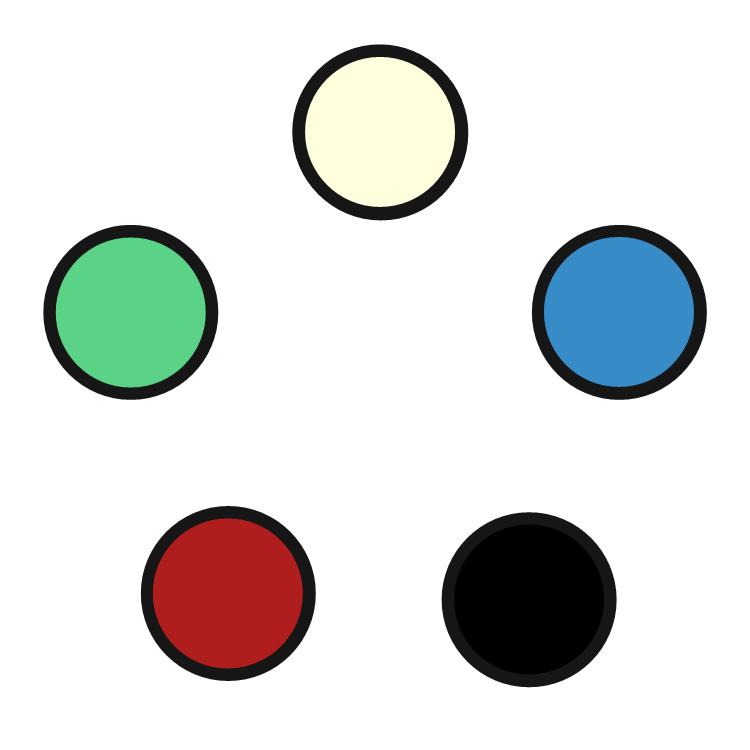
The five colors of Magic: The Gathering

Most cards in Magic are based on one of five colors that make up the game's "Color Wheel" or "Color Pie", shown on the back of each card, and each representing a school or realm of magic: white, blue, black, red, and green. The arrangement of these colors on the wheel describes relationships between the schools, which can broadly affect deck construction and game execution. For a given color such as white, the two colors immediately adjacent to it, green and blue, are considered complementary, while the two colors on the opposite side, black and red, are its opposing schools.

The Research and Development (R&D) team at Wizards of the Coast aimed to balance power and abilities among the five colors by using the Color Pie to differentiate the strengths and weaknesses of each. This guideline lays out the capabilities, themes, and mechanics of each color and allows for every color to have its own distinct attributes and gameplay. The Color Pie is used to ensure new cards are thematically in the correct color and do not infringe on the territory of other colors.

The concepts behind each of the colors on the Color Wheel, based on a series of articles written by Mark Rosewater, are as follows:

- White represents order, peace, and light, and draws mana from plains. White decks can summon individually weak creatures that are collectively strong as a group such as soldiers, as well as powerful creatures and leaders that can strengthen all of the player's creatures with additional abilities or strength. Their spells tend to focus on healing or preventing damage, protecting their allies, and neutralizing an opponent's advantages on the battlefield.
- Blue represents intellect, logic, manipulation, and trickery, and pulls its mana from islands. Its magic is typically associated with the classical elements of air and water. Many of Blue's spells can interact or interfere with the opponent's spells as well as with the general flow of the game. Blue's magic is also associated with control, allowing the player to gain temporary or full control of the opponent's creatures. Blue creatures often tend to be weak but evasive and difficult to target.
- Black represents power, death, corruption, and sacrifice, drawing mana from swamps. Many of Black's creatures are undead, and several can be sacrificed to make other creatures more powerful, destroy opponent's creatures or permanents, or other effects. Black creatures may be able to draw the life taken in an attack back to their caster, or may even be able to kill creatures through a deathtouch effect. Black's spells similarly coerce sacrifice by the player or their opponent through cards or life.
- Red represents freedom, chaos, fury, and warfare, pulling its power from mountains. Its powers are associated with the classical fire and earth elements, and it tends to have the strongest spells such as fireballs that can be powered-up by tapping additional mana when cast. Red is an offense-oriented class: in addition to powerful creatures like dragons, red decks can summon weak creatures that can strike quickly to gain the short-term edge.
- Green is the color of life, nature, evolution, and indulgence, drawing mana from forests. Green has the widest array of creatures to draw upon, ranging across all power levels, and generally is able to dominate the battlefield with many creatures in play at once. Green creatures and spells can generate life points and mana, and can also gain massive strength through spells.

Most cards in Magic: The Gathering are based on a single color, shown along the card's border. The cost to play them requires some mana of that color and potentially any amount of mana from any other color. Multicolored cards were introduced in the Legends expansion and typically use a gold border. Their casting cost includes mana from at least two colors plus additional mana from any color. Hybrid cards, included with Ravnica, use a two-color gradient border. These cards can be cast using mana from either color shown, in addition to other mana costs. Finally, colorless cards, such as some artifacts, do not have any colored mana requirements but still require a general amount of mana to be spent to play.

A specific "colorless" mana system was introduced around 2016. This is mana without any specific color, represented by a diamond-like shape in a gray circle. Colorless mana costs for a card can only be met with sources that produce colorless mana, and cannot be met with any other colored mana source, compared to "generic" mana costs which can use any colored or colorless mana source.

=== Luck vs. skill ===
Magic, like many other games, combines chance and skill. One frequent complaint about the game involves the notion that there is too much luck involved, especially concerning drawing too many or too few lands. Early in the game especially, too many or too few lands could ruin a player's chance at victory without the player having made a mistake. This in-game statistical variance can be minimized by proper deck construction, as an appropriate land count can reduce mana problems. In Duels of the Planeswalkers 2012, the land count is automatically adjusted to 40% of the total deck size.

=== Gambling ===
The original set of rules prescribed that all games were to be played for ante. Garfield was partly inspired by the game of marbles and added this rule because he wanted the players to play with the cards rather than simply collect them. The ante rule stated that each player must remove a card at random from the deck they wished to play with before the game began, and the two cards would be set aside together as the ante. At the end of the match, the winner would take and keep both cards. Early sets included a few cards with rules designed to interact with this gambling aspect, allowing replacements of cards up for ante, adding more cards to the ante, or even permanently trading ownership of cards in play. The ante concept became controversial because many regions had restrictions on games of chance. The ante rule was soon made optional because of these restrictions and because of players' reluctance to possibly lose a card that they owned. The gambling rule was also forbidden at sanctioned events. The last card to mention ante was printed in the 1995 expansion set Homelands.

== Organized play ==
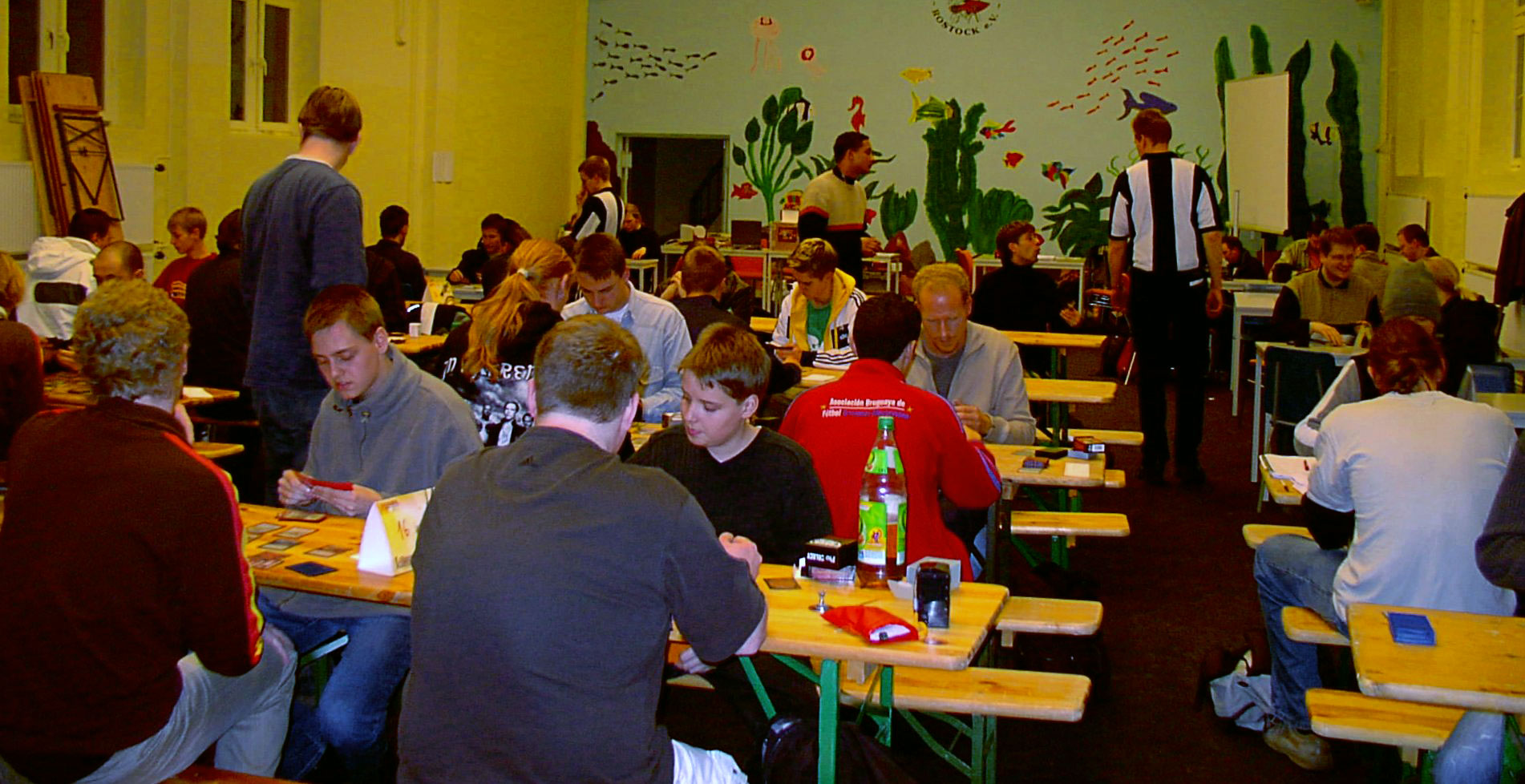
Officially sanctioned Magic tournaments attract participants of all ages and are held around the world. These players in Rostock, Germany, competed for an invitation to a professional tournament in Nagoya, Japan.

The Wizards Play Network (WPN), formerly the Duelists' Convocation International (DCI), is the organizing body for sanctioned Magic events; it is owned and operated by Wizards of the Coast. The WPN establishes the set allowances and card restrictions for the Constructed and Limited formats for regulation play for tournaments as well as for other events.

"Thousands of games shops" participate in Friday Night Magic (FNM), an event sponsored by the WPN; it is advertised as "the event where new players can approach the game, and start building their community". FNM offers both sanctioned tournament formats and all casual formats. In 2018, The New Yorker reported that "even as it has grown in popularity and size, Magic flies low to the ground. It thrives on the people who gather at lunch tables, in apartments, or in one of the six thousand stores worldwide that Wizards has licensed to put on weekly tournaments dubbed Friday Night Magic". FNM tournaments can act as a stepping-stone to more competitive play.

=== Tournaments ===
Magic tournaments regularly occur in gaming stores and other venues. Larger tournaments with hundreds of competitors from around the globe sponsored by Wizards of the Coast are arranged many times every year, with substantial cash prizes for the top finishers. A number of websites report on tournament news, give complete lists for the most currently popular decks, and feature articles on current issues of debate about the game. Additionally, the WPN maintains a set of rules for being able to sanction tournaments, as well as runs its own circuit.

==== Pro Tour and Pro Club (2005-2019) ====
By winning a yearly Invitational tournament, Jon Finkel won the right for this card to feature his design and likeness.

The WPN ran the Pro Tour as a series of major tournaments to attract interest. The right to compete in a Pro Tour had to be earned by either winning a Pro Tour Qualifier Tournament or being successful in a previous tournament on a similar level. The Pro Tour would take place over the course of three days. The first two days were usually structured in a Swiss format. On the final day, the top eight players would compete with each other in a single-elimination format to select the winner. At the end of the competition in a Pro Tour, players were awarded Pro Points depending on their finishing place. If the player finished high enough, they would also be awarded prize money. Frequent winners of these events made names for themselves in the Magic community, such as Luis Scott-Vargas, Gabriel Nassif, Kai Budde and Jon Finkel. As a promotional tool, the DCI launched the Hall of Fame in 2005 to honor selected players.

At the end of the year the Magic World Championship would be held. The World Championship functioned like a Pro Tour, except that competitors had to present their skill in three different formats (usually Standard, booster draft, and a second constructed format) rather than one. Another difference was that invitations to the World Championship could not be gained through Pro Tour Qualifiers. They could only be earned via the national championship of a country. Most countries sent their top four players of the tournament as representatives, though nations with minor Magic playing communities would sometimes only send one player. The World Championship also has a team-based competition, where the national teams compete with each other.

At the beginning of the World Championship, new members were inducted into the Hall of Fame. The tournament also concluded the current season of tournament play and at the end of the event, the player who earned the most Pro Points during the year was awarded the title "Pro Player of the Year". The player who earned the most Pro Points and did not compete in any previous season was awarded the title "Rookie of the Year".

Invitation to a Pro Tour, Pro Points, and prize money could also be earned in lesser tournaments called Grand Prix that were open to the general public and held more frequently throughout the year. Grand Prix events were usually the largest Magic tournaments, sometimes drawing more than 2,000 players. The largest Magic tournament ever held was Grand Prix: Las Vegas in May 2015 with a total of 7,551 players.

In 2018, Wizards of the Coast announced that 2019 would be the last season for The Pro Tour and the Pro Club. With these changes, the system eliminated Nationals, the World Magic Cup, and the Team Series.

==== Magic Pro League and the Player's Tour (2019-2022) ====
Starting with a partial season in 2019, the new organized play structure for Magic: The Gathering split into digital and tabletop play with separate Mythic Championships for Magic: The Gathering Arena and tabletop play.The Magic Pro League (MPL) included the top 32 players from the previous season, although two players turned down their spots. The players were notably given a $75,000/year salary and the opportunity to win much more money in exclusive tournaments. The new system consisted of several interconnected circuits: The Player's Tour, The Magic Pro League, Challengers/Rivals, Tabletop Mythic Championships, and Arena Mythic Championships. The new organized play system did maintain the yearly World Championship, but it was made a more exclusive 16 player tournament. In order to compete in the World Championship in this structure you must have placed top four in MPL, placed top four in the Challengers/Rivals League, won one of the seven tabletop or arena Mythic Championships, or won of the previous year's World Championship.

While the Mythic Championships and Magic Pro League catered to the highest level of competitive play, the Player's Tour system was meant to give a path for average players to go from their local game store to the World Championship. There were three regional Player's Tours for Europe, Asia-Pacific, and the Americas. There were several ways to qualify for a regional Player's Tour, including local store events, accumulating points at Gran Prix/MagicFests, and winning on Magic: The Gathering Online.

In 2021, it was announced that the competitive play system would undergo another shift. Wizards of the Coast stressed a return to in-person play and the end of The Magic Pro League after the 2021–2022 season. According to several players from the MPL, the message they received was that competitive Magic would no longer be supported as a full-time, high-paid esports profession.

==== Return of The Pro Tour ====
After announcing that The Magic Pro League would no longer be supported, Wizards of the Coast announced a return to the branding of The Pro Tour. With a simplified structure, the new Pro Tour system kept some of the original aspects from the system introduced in 2005, like a point system and the World Championship tournament each year. The new system starts players at Regional Championship qualifiers. Winners of local qualifiers advance to Regional Championships which would be comparable to a Grand Prix in the previous systems. If a player performs well enough at their Regional Championship, they can qualify for a Pro Tour tournament. Players who earned 10 wins in the previous pro tour or have enough Adjusted Match Win (AMW) points from the previous season also earn a Pro Tour Qualification. The World Championship under the new system will have around 128 players who will compete for a $1,000,000 prize pool.

== Development ==
=== Inception ===
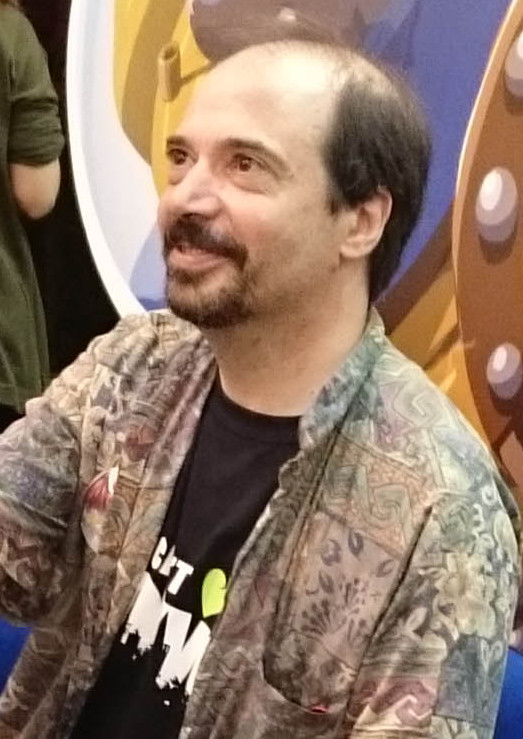
Garfield in 2014

Richard Garfield had an early attachment to games during his youth: before settling down in Oregon, his father, an architect, had taken his family to Bangladesh and Nepal during his work projects. Garfield did not speak the native languages, but was able to make friends with the local youth through playing cards or marbles. Once back in the United States, he had heard of Dungeons & Dragons but neither his local game store nor his friends had a copy, so he developed his own version of what he thought the game would be based on the descriptions he had read, which he considered closer to Clue, with players moving from room to room fighting monsters with a fixed end-goal. When Garfield eventually got copies of the Dungeons & Dragons rulesets, he was surprised that it was a more open-ended game but was "dreadfully written". Dungeons & Dragons's open-endedness inspired him, like many others, to develop their own game ideas from it. For Garfield, this was a game he called Five Magics, based on five elemental magics that were drawn from geographically diverse areas. While this remained the core concept of Five Magics, Garfield continued to refine the game while growing up, often drastically changing the base type of game, though never planned to publish this game.

In 1991, Garfield was a doctoral candidate in combinatorial mathematics at University of Pennsylvania and had been brought on as an adjunct professor at Whitman College. During his candidacy, he developed his ideas and had playtested RoboRally, a board game based on moving robots through a factory filled with hazards. Garfield had been seeking publishers for the title, and his colleague, Mike Davis, suggested the newly formed Wizards of the Coast, a small outfit established by Peter Adkison, a systems analyst for Boeing in Seattle. In mid-1991, the three arranged to meet in Oregon near Garfield's parents' home. Adkison was impressed by RoboRally but considered that it had too many logistics and would be too risky for him to publish. He told Garfield and Davis that he liked Garfield's ideas and that he was looking for a portable game that could be played in the downtime that frequently occurs at gaming conventions.

After the meeting, Garfield remained in Oregon to contemplate Adkison's advice. While hiking near Multnomah Falls, he was inspired to take his Five Magics concept but apply it to collectible color-themed cards, so that each player could make a customizable deck, something each player could consider part of their identity. Garfield arranged to meet with Adkison back in Seattle within the week, and when Adkison heard the idea, he recognized the potential that this would be a game that could be expanded on indefinitely with new cards in contrast to most typical tabletop games; Adkison later wrote on the idea on a USENET post "If executed properly, [the cards] would make us millions." Adkison immediately agreed to produce it.

=== Initial design ===
Garfield returned to Pennsylvania and set out to design the game's core rules and initial cards, with about 150 completed in the few months after his return. The type of gameplay centered on each color remained consistent with how Five Magics had been and with how Magic: The Gathering would stay in the future, such as red representing aggressive attacks. Other games also influenced the design at this point, with Garfield citing games like Cosmic Encounter and Strat-o-matic Baseball as games that differ each time they are played because of different sets of cards being in play.

Initial "cards" were based on using available copyrighted art, and copied to paper to be tested by groups of volunteers at the university. (Note: Some of these original designs will be made part of the "Zeta Set" Secret Lair drop in September 2026.) About six months after the meeting with Adkison, Garfield had refined the first complete version of his game. Garfield also began to set the narrative of the game in "Dominia", a multiverse of infinite "planes" from which players, as wizards, can draw power, which would allow for the vast array of creatures and magics that he was planning for the cards.

Garfield has stated that two major influences in his creation of Magic: the Gathering were the games Cosmic Encounter, which first used the concept that normal rules could sometimes be overridden, and Dungeons & Dragons. One of the "Magic Golden Rules" states that "Whenever a card's text directly contradicts these rules, the card takes precedence." The Comprehensive Rules, a detailed rulebook, exists to clarify conflicts.

Simultaneously, Adkison sought investment into Wizards of the Coast to prepare to publish the game. The company had already committed to completing The Primal Order rulebook, aimed to be compatible with most other role-playing systems on the market, which most investment was drawn to. He had to bring in a number of local Cornish artists to create the fantasy art for Garfield's cards, offering them shares in Wizards of the Coast in payment. After The Primal Order was published in 1992, Wizards of the Coast was sued by Palladium for copyright infringement, a case that was settled out of court and with the result that a second printing of The Primal Order removed the rules relevant to Palladium's system, but this case also financially harmed Wizards of the Coast. Adkison decided to create a separate company, Garfield Games, for publishing the card game.

While the game was simply called Magic through most of playtesting, when the game had to be officially named a lawyer informed them that the name Magic was too generic to be trademarked. Mana Clash was instead chosen to be the name used in the first solicitation of the game. However, everybody involved with the game continued to refer to it simply as Magic. After further legal consultation, it was decided to rename the game Magic: The Gathering, thus enabling the name to be trademarked.

=== First releases ===
By 1993, Garfield and Adkison had gotten everything ready to debut Magic: The Gathering at that year's Gen Con in Milwaukee that August, but did not have the funds for production to have cards shipped to game stores in time. Adkison took a single box of cards with a handful of complete decks to the Wizards booth at Origins Game Fair hoping to secure the funds by demonstrating the game. Among those he demonstrated to were representatives of Wargames West, manufacturers of historical tactics games; the representatives eventually brought their CEO over, and after seeing the game, took Adkison to dinner and negotiated funding terms. Adkison returned with US$40,000, enough to make the necessary orders.

Magic: The Gathering underwent a general release on August 5, 1993. After shipping the orders, Adkison and his wife drove towards Milwaukee while making stops at game stores to demonstrate the game and drum up support for Gen Con. Their initial stops were quiet, but word of mouth from previous stops spread, and as they traveled south and west, they found larger and larger crowds anxiously awaiting their arrival. Garfield met up with Adkison at Gen Con, where their shipment of 2.5 million cards had been delayed a day. Despite this, by the end of the convention, they had completely sold out.

Magic was an immediate success for Wizards of the Coast. By October 1993, it had sold out its supply of 10 million cards. Wizards was even reluctant to advertise the game because it was unable to keep pace with existing demand. Initially Magic attracted many Dungeons & Dragons players, but the following included all types of other people as well.

=== Expansions ===
The success of the initial edition prompted a reissue later in 1993, along with expansions to the game. Arabian Nights was released as the first expansion in December 1993. New expansions and revisions of the base game ("Core Sets") have since been released on a regular basis, amounting to four releases a year. By the end of 1994, the game had printed over a billion cards. Until the release of Mirage in 1996, expansions were released on an irregular basis. Beginning in 2009 one revision of the core set and a set of three related expansions called a "block" were released every year.

This system was revised in 2015, with the Core Set being eliminated and blocks now consisting of two sets, released semiannually. A further revision occurred in 2018, reversing the elimination of the core sets and no longer constraining sets to blocks. While the essence of the game has always stayed the same, the rules of Magic have undergone three major revisions with the release of the Revised Edition in 1994, Classic Edition in 1999, and Magic 2010 in July 2009. With the release of the Eighth Edition in 2003, Magic received a major visual redesign.

In 1996, Wizards of the Coast established the "Pro Tour", a circuit of tournaments where players can compete for sizeable cash prizes over the course of a single weekend-long tournament. In 2009 the top prize at a single tournament was US$40,000. Sanctioned through the DCI, the tournaments added an element of prestige to the game by virtue of the cash payouts and media coverage from within the community. For a brief period of time, ESPN2 televised the tournaments.

By April 1997, 2 billion cards had been sold. In 1999, Wizards of The Coast was acquired by Hasbro for $325 million, making Magic a Hasbro game.

A patent was granted to Wizards of the Coast in 1997 for "a novel method of game play and game components that in one embodiment are in the form of trading cards" that includes claims covering games whose rules include many of Magic's elements in combination, including concepts such as changing orientation of a game component to indicate use (referred to in the rules of Magic and later of Garfield's games such as Vampire: The Eternal Struggle as "tapping") and constructing a deck by selecting cards from a larger pool. The patent has aroused criticism from some observers, who believe some of its claims to be invalid. In 2003, the patent was an element of a larger legal dispute between Wizards of the Coast and Nintendo, regarding trade secrets related to Nintendo's Pokémon Trading Card Game. The legal action was settled out of court, and its terms were not disclosed. In February 2018, Wizards stated that between the years of 2008 and 2016 it had printed over 20 billion Magic: the Gathering cards.

Wizards has continued to release expansions and sets through 2023, though the number of such expansions released per year began to increase, leading to concerns from investors and analysis that the accelerated release may create market fatigue.

== Production and marketing ==
Magic: The Gathering cards are produced in much the same way as normal playing cards. Each Magic card, approximately 63 × 88 mm in size (2.5 by 3.5 inches), has a face which displays the card's name and rules text as well as an illustration appropriate to the card's concept. 23,318 unique cards have been produced for the game as of September 2016, many of them with variant editions, artwork, or layouts, and 600–1000 new ones are added each year. The first Magic cards were printed exclusively in English, but current sets are also printed in Traditional Chinese, French, German, Italian, Japanese, Korean, Russian, and Spanish.

The overwhelming majority of Magic cards are issued and marketed in the form of sets. For the majority of its history there were two types: the Core Set and the themed expansion sets. Under Wizards of the Coast's current production and marketing scheme, a new set is released quarterly. The majority of cards are sold in booster packs, which contain fifteen cards normally divided into four rarities, which can be differentiated by the color of the expansion symbol. (Note: For cards released prior to Exodus, rarities must be checked against an external cardlist or database, as all expansion symbols were black.) A fifteen-card booster pack will typically contain one rare (gold), three uncommons (silver), ten commons (black), and one basic land (colored black, as commons). Sets prior to Shards of Alara contained eleven commons instead of a basic land. Shards of Alara also debuted mythic rares (red-orange), which replace one in eight rare cards on average. There are also premium versions of every card with holographic foil, randomly inserted into some boosters in place of a common, which replace about one in seventy cards.

- Each standard-legal set since Ikoria (except Core 2021) features 2-5 Commander decks, as the Commander format has become one of the most popular ways to play Magic, releasing preconstructed commander decks with every set allows for the creation of cards unique to the format that are thematically tied to the setting of their respective expansion, as well as giving more options to new players who want to try Commander.
- Each set from Kaladesh to Core 2021 (except Ikoria) featured two Planeswalker decks, which were meant to help new players learn the game. They contained a 60-card pre-constructed deck with an exclusive Planeswalker, as well as several exclusive cards, two booster packs from the set they accompanied, as well as a rule guide and a card board box with an image of the included Planeswalker.
- Each set from Shards of Alara to Eldritch Moon featured five Intro Packs, which fulfilled the same function as planeswalker decks. They contained a 60-card pre-constructed deck, as well as two booster packs from the set they accompany and a rule guide.
- Each set from Mirrodin Besieged to Gatecrash featured two Event Decks, which were pre-constructed decks designed as an introduction to tournament play. Beginning with Dragon's Maze, each set featured only one Event Deck. However, event decks were discontinued after the set Battle for Zendikar.
- Previously, cards were also sold in Tournament Packs typically containing three rares, ten uncommons, thirty-two commons, and thirty basic lands. (Note: "Typically" is used due to a change in card distribution in Time Spiral which allows premium cards of any rarity to replace Common cards instead of cards of their own rarity.) Tournament Packs were discontinued after Shards of Alara.

The Core Sets began to be released annually (previously biennially) in July 2009 coinciding with the name change from 10th Edition to Magic 2010. This shift also introduced new, never before printed cards into the core set, something that previously had never been done. However, core sets were discontinued following the release of Magic Origins, on July 17, 2015, at the same time that two-set blocks were introduced. Wizards of Coast announced on June 12, 2017, that they planned on revamping and reintroducing a revamped core set, and Core Set 2019 was released on July 13, 2018.

In addition to the quarterly set releases, Magic cards are released in other products as well, such as the Planechase and Archenemy spin-off games. These combine reprinted Magic cards with new, oversized cards with new functionality. Magic cards are also printed specifically for collectors, such as the From the Vault and Premium Deck Series sets, which contain exclusively premium foil cards.

In 2003, starting with the Eighth Edition Core Set, the game went through its biggest visual change since its creation—a new card frame layout was developed to allow more rules text and larger art on the cards, while reducing the thick, colored border to a minimum. The new frame design aimed to improve contrast and readability using black type instead of the previous white, a new font, and partitioned areas for the name, card type, and power and toughness. The card frame was changed once again in Core Set 2015, which maintained the same templating, but made the card sleeker and added a holo-foil stamp to every rare and mythic card to curtail counterfeiting.

For the first few years of its production, Magic: The Gathering featured a small number of cards with names or artwork with demonic or occultist themes, in 1995 the company elected to remove such references from the game. In 2002, believing that the depiction of demons was becoming less controversial and that the game had established itself sufficiently, Wizards of the Coast reversed this policy and resumed printing cards with "demon" in their names.

In 2019, starting with Throne of Eldraine, booster packs have a chance of containing an alternate art "showcase card". This is to increase the reward of buying boosters and make opening packs more exciting.

A new format, "Jumpstart", was introduced in July 2020 alongside the Core 2021 set. These are special themed 20-card booster packs, based on nearly 500 cards, several being reprints of cards from previous sets, with 121 possible packs available. Each is a curated set rather than random selection of cards, built around a theme, such as "Pirates" or "Unicorns". Each theme has a small number of possible card sets on that theme, distributed on a rarity basis, such that the specific booster that a player purchases will still be a random selection. Because many are reprints, not all Jumpstart cards are available to be used in the various Constructed formats but can be used in other modes of play. Jumpstart was designed to make it much easier to get into Magic by eliminating the deck-building but still providing some customization and randomness that comes with card acquisition and deck building. A special Jumpstart format was introduced for these boosters, where players select two desired themes, and are given a random booster from those themes and sufficient land cards to make a 60-card deck.

The first official serialized cards in Magic: The Gathering debuted in November 2021 as a secret test via a mirrored foil Viscera Seer included in Phyrexian Praetors: Compleat Edition Secret Lair boxes. However, the first widely released serialized cards in booster packs arrived with The Brothers' War on November 18, 2022, which featured a retro-frame artifact bonus sheet that could have serial numbers ranging from 1 to 500. Serialized cards are typically only available from collector booster packs and fetch a higher market price than their unserialized counterparts due to their scarcity, rarity, and sometimes unique artwork. Although in earlier sets there used to be multiple serialized cards, Wizards of the Coast has transitioned toward limiting many modern sets to a single "headliner" or ultra-rare serialized card rather than large pools of them and the maximum serial number can change depending on the card.

With the release of the Murders At Karlov Manor set in February 2024, Wizards have introduced a new booster set called "Play boosters", which replace Draft and Set booster packs in the future. Play boosters contain 14 cards with a set distribution of common, uncommon, and rare/mythic cards, along with land and wildcards; however, within each of these, there is a chance for special "booster fun" variant. There is also a chance at a card from "The List", a limited number of cards from MTG's history. These boosters are intended to be usable for draft gameplay modes as well as for normal library expansion, as in years since the Set booster introduction, Wizards had found that stores favors those sales over Draft boosters.

In 2025, Wizards announced that 2026 would have 7 standard-legal sets releasing, the highest ever. They also clarified that 2027 would return to the norm of 6.

Wizards announced additional changes to booster pack composition and contents starting in 2027, including the renaming of Play boosters back to the previously-used "booster packs". Beginning with Nauctis: The Sunken Realm, and for future in-universe expansions thereafter, 1 out of every 1,000 booster packs will be "God packs", replacing the entire pack's contents for with only rare and mythic rare cards. The changes also affected collector boosters, with 1 out of every 300 collector boosters being replaced with a God pack, although the composition of God packs differ between booster packs and collector boosters. To compensate for these changes, foil common and uncommon rarity cards were entirely removed from booster packs, and are now exclusive to collector boosters.

=== Writing and storyline ===
Garfield had established that Magic: The Gathering took place in a Multiverse with countless possible worlds (planes), the game's primary events taking place on the planes of Dominaria, Ravnica, Zendikar, and Innistrad. Only extremely rare beings called planeswalkers are capable of traversing the Multiverse. This allows the game to frequently change worlds so as to renew its mechanical inspiration, while maintaining planeswalkers as recurrent, common elements across worlds. Players represent planeswalkers able to draw on the magics and entities of these planes to do battle with others. Story elements were told through the cards' flavor text, and a driving narrative. The first expansion Arabian Nights designed by Garfield was based on One Thousand and One Nights folklore and include figures from that like Aladdin.

Early expansions were designed separately, each with their own internal narrative to establish concepts, keywords, and flavoring. With Weatherlight, the team wanted to start a longer arc that would cover multiple expansions over five years that would also extend into comics, magazines, and other media. However, with a change in oversight of the Magic: The Gathering team, player fatigue, and a disconnect between the novels and cards, this plan was scrapped, returning to the general approach of designing a narrative specific to one expansion.

Wizards, which had regained the license from Harper Prism and Armada (an imprint of Acclaim Entertainment) to write novels for Magic: The Gathering, still worked to integrate the novel writing staff with the game designers so that there was some cohesion between the game and books, but did not seek to make this a key priority as the Weatherlight goal had been. Novels soon gave way to eBooks and later to shorter stories posted on the Wizards' website which fared better in terms of popularity.

In 2017, Wizards hired novelist and scriptwriter Nic Kelman as their Head of Story and Entertainment. Kelman became responsible for crafting the Magic: The Gathering story bible from all established lore as reference for further expansions and for the external media. This task helped Kelmen to prepare the novel War of the Spark: Ravnica that was published just prior to the new set War of the Spark, with cards retaining continuity with the novel and past events.

=== Artwork ===
Each card has an illustration to represent the flavor of the card, often reflecting the setting of the expansion for which it was designed. Much of Magic's early artwork was commissioned with little specific direction or concern for visual cohesion. One infamous example was the printing of the creature Whippoorwill without the "flying" ability even though its art showed a bird in flight. The art direction team later decided to impose a few constraints so that the artistic vision more closely aligned with the design and development of the cards. Each block of cards now has its own style guide with sketches and descriptions of the various races and places featured in the setting.

A few early sets experimented with alternate art for cards. However, Wizards came to believe that this impeded easy recognition of a card and that having multiple versions caused confusion when identifying a card at a glance. Consequently, alternate art is now only used sparingly and mostly for promotional cards. (Note: A notable exception are Basic Land cards, but those are easily identifiable due to the oversized mana symbol in their text boxes.) When older cards are reprinted in new sets, however, Wizards of the Coast usually prints them with new art to make the older cards more collectible, though they sometimes reuse well-received artwork if it makes sense thematically. In some countries, the artwork on Magic cards has been changed to comply with government policy. For example, the depiction of skeletons and most undead creatures was prohibited by the Chinese government until 2008.

=== Promotional crossovers ===
Wizards of the Coast has introduced special cards and sets that include cross-promotional elements with other brands, typically as promotional cards not legal for Standard play and that may not be playable even in eternal formats. Four promotional cards were sold at HasCon 2017, featuring three other Hasbro brands, Transformers, Nerf, and Dungeons & Dragons. A special three-card set based on characters from My Little Pony: Friendship Is Magic (another Hasbro brand) was sold as both physical product and digital items within MTG Arena to support the Extra Life charity. The "Ikoria, Lair of Behemoths" set released in April 2020 included 16 kaiju monsters from Toho as promotional cards, such as Godzilla.

==== Secret Lair ====
The Secret Lair promotional series has also been used to introduce crossover cards from other brands (as well as special artists through Special Guest cards); these cards are generally legal for play and use existing cards with new art, names, and flavor to fit the theme. As part of the Secret Lair set in 2020, a number of cards were made that featured crossovers with AMC's television show The Walking Dead, which the development team felt was a natural fit since zombies were already part of the Magic game. A limited set of land cards in the Secret Lair featured paintings from Bob Ross, licensed through his estate.

In June 2021, Wizards of the Coast announced a Secret Lair based on the Dungeons and Dragons animated series. Secret Lair drops in 2021 featured cards based on Stranger Things, while Fortnite and Street Fighter were featured in 2022. In 2022, cards illustrated by mangaka Junji Ito were released as Special Guest cards.

The 2024 Secret Lair release featured cards based on Monty Python and the Holy Grail, including a Tim the Enchanter card based on the standard Prodigal Sorceror card which has been nicknamed Tim in honor of the film character by the Magic community. There are also Secret Lair cards based on musicians, mainly Post Malone (an avid fan of the card game), and multiple drops featuring Hatsune Miku and various Vocaloid characters.

A Marvel Secret Lair set was released in November 2024. In 2025, Secret Lair featured SpongeBob SquarePants and Sonic the Hedgehog.

==== Universes Beyond ====
The Universes Beyond series has been used to bring more crossover properties into Magic such as Warhammer 40,000 and The Lord of the Rings. Whereas Secret Lair sets may only consist of a few cards that may be unplayable under normal rules, Universes Beyond sets include dozens of cards, including Commander decks and booster packs, and their cards are play-legal and often usable in most Magic gameplay formats. Universes Beyond sets for Doctor Who, and Jurassic Park were released in 2024. In 2025, in addition to sets based on Final Fantasy and Spider-Man, all future Universes Beyond sets will be made legal to play in all formats. Sets based on video games Fallout and Assassin's Creed, were released as well. Wizards has also partnered with Marvel Comics to bring several "tent-pole" sets featuring Marvel characters to the game, starting with a Spider-Man themed set, which was released in 2025, and continuing with a Marvel Super Heroes set, released in June 2026.

==== Dungeons & Dragons ====
Wizards has continued to develop a strong connection between the Magic and the Dungeons & Dragons (D&D) universes, also owned by Wizards of the Coast. Greg Tito, Wizards of the Coast Senior Communications Manager, said that "there is a huge crossover between Magic players and D&D players". In July 2021, a D&D themed set expansion, Adventures in the Forgotten Realms, was released; it is based on the Forgotten Realms campaign setting. Separately, elements of Magic have been brought into the role-playing game. The first such official crossover was a D&D campaign setting book for the plane of Ravnica, a Magic expansion introduced in 2005 and 2006 and later revisited in the 2018 expansion Guilds of Ravnica.

Guildmasters' Guide to Ravnica was also published in 2018 to correspond with the newer Magic expansion's release. A second campaign setting book, Mythic Odysseys of Theros (2020), introduced the plane of Theros to D&D and corresponded with the 2020 Theros Beyond Death expansion. Strixhaven: A Curriculum of Chaos (2021) introduces the 2021 Magic expansion as a D&D campaign setting; it was released in December 2021.

== Reception ==
=== Critical reviews ===
Greg Gorden reviewed Magic: The Gathering in White Wolf #38 (1993), rating it a 4 out of 5 and stated that "Small game companies struggle along until they get their breakout product. West End Games had Star Wars. White Wolf had Vampire. I feel Magic is Wizards of the Coast's breakout game... if their cards fall right."

Scott Haring reviewed Magic: The Gathering in Pyramid #4 (Nov./Dec., 1993), and stated that "Not only is Magic the best gaming bargain to come down the pike in memory; not only is it the most original idea in years; it's also a delightfully addictive game that you and your friends will find impossible to put down." Marcelo A. Figueroa reviewed the game in a 1993 issue of Space Gamer/Fantasy Gamer, noting both positives and negatives, stating that, "despite all of its flaws, it's as endearing as Star Fleet Battles". Overall, Figueroa rated the game a 7 out of 10.

Paul Pettengale reviewed Magic: The Gathering 5th Edition for Arcane magazine, rating it an 8 out of 10 overall, and stated that "Magic: The Gathering is an excellent and absorbing game, which has a huge following (you're never going to be short of people to play with). However, some of the rules structures are clumsy and make it overly complicated. The 5th Edition is not as much fun to play as earlier core sets, though most people will be creating decks with cards from other expansions too, which makes it more exciting. Magic is still one of the very best CCGs, but 5th Edition adds little to it, and takes too much away."

A 2004 article in USA Today suggested that playing Magic might help improve the social and mental skills of some of the players. The article interviewed players' parents who believe that the game, similar to sports, teaches children how to more gracefully win and lose. Magic also contains a great amount of strategy and vocabulary that children may not be exposed to on a regular basis. Parents also claimed that playing Magic helped keep their children out of trouble, such as using illegal drugs or joining criminal gangs. On the other hand, the article also briefly mentions that Magic can be highly addictive, leading to parents worried about their children's Magic obsession. In addition, until 2007, some of the better players had opportunities to compete for a small number of scholarships.

Jordan Weisman, an American game designer and entrepreneur, commented

I love games that challenge and change our definition of adventure gaming, and Magic: The Gathering is definitely one of a very short list of titles that has accomplished that elusive goal. By combining the collecting and trading elements of baseball cards with the fantasy play dynamics of role-playing games, Magic created a whole new genre of product that changed our industry forever.

In 2015, The Guardian reported that an estimated 20 million people played Magic around the world and that the game had a thriving tournament scene, a professional league, and a weekly organized game program called Friday Night Magic.

A July 2019 article in Bloomberg reported that "Magic is part of the [Hasbro's] 'franchise brands,' a segment that accounted for $2.45 billion in net revenue for the company last year, bigger than its emerging, partner and gaming brand units combined. [Chris] Cocks said Magic accounts for a 'meaningful portion' of that, with KeyBanc estimating the game's contribution is already more than $500 million—including both the physical cards and the nascent digital version. Of the franchise brands, only Magic and Monopoly logged revenue gains last year". Magic: The Gathering Arena, a free-to-play digital collectible card game with microtransaction purchases based on Magic, was released in 2019.

In 2022, The Gamer and Kotaku reported on the increased product release schedule for Magic: The Gathering with The Gamer opining that the increased number of preview seasons for the game was leading to exhaustion within the community and had "drained the well of enthusiasm dry". Wizards released a commemorative product, Magic: The Gathering 30th Anniversary Edition, for $999; this product rereleased cards which were not sanctioned for tournament play. CNET stated that "it's not a practical purchase, it's a piece of art". Both WBUR and Vice reported that many fans were unhappy with the price point of the product. Vice commented that there is "a growing divide in the Magic: The Gathering community between the casual players and the collectors" as "some rich collectors have turned the cards into a kind of commodities market [...]. Wizards of the Coast has increasingly catered to this kind of consumer" leading to products that are too expensive for many casual players. CNBC reported that "Bank of America downgraded the stock of Wizard of the Coast's owner, Hasbro" in November 2022 with analyst Jason Haas stating that changes to the Magic: The Gathering "brand amount to Hasbro 'killing its golden goose'" and highlighting that the "primary concern" is the overproduction of "Magic cards which has propped up Hasbro's recent results but is destroying the long-term value of the brand".

==== Reception to crossovers ====
Despite commercial success, Universes Beyond and Secret Lairs has had mixed reception among fans. The integration of IP into all formats and the higher cost of crossover cards were characterized as "ongoing complaints" by Magic's head designer Mark Rosewater, although according to Rosewater, "that sentiment continually shrinks over time."

In Polygon's look at Magic's 2026 set schedule, Plante argues the Teenage Mutant Ninja Turtle set "widens the definition of what might 'fit' in Magic" and compared the universes to DC's Crisis on Infinite Earths. The creative changes have been compared to Fortnite's gradual inclusion of pop culture. Curtis Silver in Forbes argued there were many potential creative opportunities in adding TMNT to Magic, such as ooze effects and food tokens. The Gamer writer Eric Switzer framed the Dwight Schrute Secret Lair drop as "IP slop" and "cringe", questioning the connection between the character and his cards.

=== Awards ===
- 1994: Mensa Select Award winner
- 1994: Origins Awards for Best Fantasy or Science Fiction Board game of 1993 and Best Graphic Presentation of a Board game of 1993
- 1994: Origins Award for the Legends expansion as Best Game Accessory
- 1995: Deutscher Spiele Preis special award for new game mechanics
- 1995: Italian Gaming Society Gioco dell'Anno award winner
- 1996: Super As d'Or award for "Best New Game Concept and Genre Introduced in France"
- 1997: InQuest Fan Award for Best CCG Expansion for the Weatherlight expansion
- 1998: Origins Award for the Urza's Saga expansion as Collectible Card Game Expansion of the Year
- 1999: Inducted alongside Richard Garfield into the Origins Hall of Fame
- 2003: Games Magazine selected Magic for its Games Hall of Fame
- 2005: Origins Award for the Ravnica: City of Guilds expansion as Collectible Card Game Expansion of the Year
- 2009: Origins Award for the Shards of Alara expansion as Collectible Card Game Expansion of the Year
- 2012: Origins Award for the Innistrad expansion as Collectible Card Game Expansion of the Year
- 2015: Origins Award for the Khans of Tarkir expansion as Best Collectible Card Game of the Year
- 2019: Inducted into the National Toy Hall of Fame

In addition, several individuals including Richard Garfield and Donato Giancola won personal awards for their contributions to Magic.

=== Legacy ===
The success of Magic: The Gathering led to the creation of similar games by other companies as well as Wizards of the Coast themselves. Companion Games produced the Galactic Empires CCG (the first science fiction trading card game), which allowed players to pay for and design their own promotional cards, while TSR created the Spellfire game, which eventually included five editions in six languages, plus twelve expansion sets. Wizards of the Coast produced Jyhad (now called Vampire: The Eternal Struggle), a game about modern-day vampires. Other similar games included trading card games based on Star Trek and Star Wars. Magic is often cited as an example of a 1990s collecting fad, though the game's makers were able to overcome the bubble traditionally associated with collecting fads. Its popularity often was associated with addictive behavior similar to gambling through the allure of gaining new cards in booster packs and expansions, and due to this, Magic: The Gathering has been sometimes called "cardboard crack" by both fans and critics.

=== Secondary market ===
There is an active secondary market in individual cards among players and game shops. This market arose from two different facets: players seeking specific cards to help complete or enhance their existing decks and thus were less concerned on the value of the cards themselves; and from collectors seeking the rarer cards for their monetary value to complete collections. Many physical and online stores sell single cards or "playsets" of four of a card. Common cards rarely sell for more than a few cents and are usually sold in bulk. Uncommon cards and weak rare cards typically sell from 10¢ up to US$1.

A few of the oldest cards, due to smaller printings and limited distribution, are highly valued and rare. This is partly due to the Reserved List, a list of cards from the sets Alpha to Urza's Destiny (1994–1999) that Wizards has promised never to reprint.Legacy-only cards on the Reserved List are in short supply due to smaller print runs of the game's earliest releases, and may be worth $200 to $1,000 or higher. Certain Vintage cards—the oldest cards in Magic, with most on the Reserved List, such as the "Power Nine"—can easily cost more than $1,000 apiece.

The most expensive card that was in regular print, versus a promotional or special printing, is the Black Lotus, which are today valued at thousands of dollars. In 2019, an anonymous buyer purchased an unsigned "Pristine 9.5 grade" Beckett Grading Services-graded Alpha Black Lotus for $166,100. A PSA "Gem Mint 10" graded Alpha Black Lotus, framed in a case signed by its artist Christopher Rush, sold at auction for $511,100 in January 2021, while a similar Black Lotus of the same quality sold for $540,000 in March 2023. In July 2023, the singleton "One Ring" card printed as part of The Lord of the Rings crossover set was found by a retail worker in Toronto, who later sold it to rapper Post Malone for $2 million. A mint-condition Alpha Black Lotus sold for $3 million in April 2024.

The secondary market started with comic book stores and hobby shops displaying and selling cards, with the cards' values determined somewhat arbitrarily by the employees of the store. Hobbyist magazines, already tracking prices of sports trading cards, engaged with the Magic secondary market by surveying the stores to inquire on current prices to cards, which they then published. With the expansion of the Internet, prices of cards were determined by the number of tournament deck lists a given card would appear in. If a card was played in a tournament more frequently, the cost of the card would be higher, in addition to the market availability of the card.

When eBay, Amazon, and other large online markets started to gain popularity, the Magic secondary market evolved substantially, with the site TCGPlayer.com launched in 2008 being the first that not only compiled the pricing data but allowed for players to buy and sell cards for Magic and other CCGs directly via the site. TCGPlayer developed a metric called the TCG Market Price for each card that was based on the most recent sales, allowing for near real-time valuation of a card in the same manner as a stock market. Buying and selling Magic cards online became a source of income for people who learned how to manipulate the market. As of late 2013, Wizards of the Coast has expressed concern over the increasing number of counterfeit cards in the secondary market. Wizards of the Coast has since made an effort to counteract the rise of counterfeits by introducing a new holo-foil stamp on all rare and mythic rare cards as of Magic 2015.

The Magic secondary market has become an area of study for consumer research, and the most expensive Magic cards are among the most expensive CCG cards. Some people make a career out of market manipulation, creating mathematical models to analyze the growth of cards' worth, and predict the market value of both individual cards, and entire sets of cards. Magic's economy has also been tied to the introduction of Bitcoin and other cryptocurrencies, as Magic cards represent a physical asset that can be converted back and forth into the virtual currency. Nearly all of Magic's trading market is unregulated, and issues related to insider trading based on planned changes to the game have occurred. Active Magic financial traders have gained a poor reputation with more casual Magic players due to the lack of regulations, and that the market manipulations makes it costly for casual players to buy single cards simply for purposes for improving decks.

=== Academic analysis ===
There are several examples of academic, peer-reviewed research concerning different aspects of Magic: The Gathering. One study examined how players use their imaginations when playing. This research studied hobby players and showed how players sought to create and participate in an epic fantasy narrative. Another example used online auctions for Magic cards to test revenue outcomes for various auction types. A third example uses probability to examine Magic card-collecting strategies.

Using a specific set of cards in a specialized manner has shown Magic: The Gathering to be Turing complete. By proving this, the researchers assert that Magic: The Gathering is so complex as to be Turing complete and capable of being "programmed" to perform any task, that in terms of playing an actual game of Magic, "the winning strategy is non-computable", making it an improbable challenge to devise computer opponents that can play Magic in a mathematically optimal manner.

== Franchise ==
Magic: The Gathering video games, comics, and books have been produced under licensing or directly by Wizards of the Coast.

=== Other traditional games ===
In 2015 Wizards of the Coast and Hasbro published Magic: The Gathering – Arena of the Planeswalkers. Arena of the Planeswalkers is a tactical board game where the players maneuver miniatures over a customizable board game, and the ruleset and terrain is based on Heroscape, but with an addition of spell cards and summoning. The original master set includes miniatures that represent the five planeswalkers Gideon, Jace, Liliana, Chandra, and Nissa as well as select creatures from the Magic: The Gathering universe. They later released an expansion Battle for Zendikar featuring multi-color planeswalkers Kiora and Ob Nixilis and a colorless Eldrazi Ruiner, and a second master set Shadows Over Innistrad which has 4 new planeswalkers and also includes the addition of cryptoliths.

=== Video games ===
There are currently two official video game adaptions of Magic: The Gathering for online play. Magic: The Gathering Online, first introduced in 2002, allows for players to buy cards and boosters and play against others including in officially-sanctioned tournaments for prize money. Magic: The Gathering Arena, introduced in 2019, is fashioned after the free-to-play Hearthstone, with players able to acquire new cards for free or through spending real-world funds. Arena is currently limited to online events with in-game prizes, but is currently being positioned by Wizards of the Coast to also serve as a means for official tournament play, particularly after the COVID-19 pandemic. Both Online and Arena are regularly updated with new Core and Expansion cards as well as all rule changes made by Wizards.

In addition, Wizards of the Coast has worked with other developers for various iterations of Magic: The Gathering as a card game in a single-player game format. Microprose developed 1997 Magic: The Gathering and its expansions, which had the player travel the world of Shandalar to challenge computer opponents, earn cards to customize their decks, improve their own planeswalker attributes and ultimately defeat a powerful planeswalker. Stainless Games developed a series of titles starting with 2009's Magic: The Gathering – Duels of the Planeswalkers and culminating with 2015's Magic Duels, a free-to-play title. The Duels series did not feature full sets of Magic cards but selected subsets, and were initially designed to couple a challenging single-player experience with an advanced artificial-intelligence computer opponent. Later games in the series added in more deck-building options and multiplayer support.

Additional games have tried other variations of the Magic: The Gathering gameplay in other genres. Acclaim developed a real-time strategy game Magic: The Gathering: BattleMage in 2003, in which the player's abilities were inspired by the various cards. Acclaim also had made a 1997 arcade game Magic: The Gathering – Armageddon, a Breakout-style trackball-based game, but only as many as six cabinets were known to have been made. Hiberium and D3 Publisher developed Magic: The Gathering – Puzzle Quest, combining deck building with match-3-style casual gaming. This was released in December 2015 as a freemium game and continues to be updated with new card sets from the physical game. Cryptic Studios and Perfect World Entertainment have started beta tests for Magic: Legends, a massively multiplayer online action role-playing game for personal computers and consoles. The title was cancelled ahead of its full release in 2021; executive producer Stephen Ricossa explained that the game's creative vision had "missed the mark".

In addition to official programs, a number of unofficial programs were developed to help users track their Magic: The Gathering collection and allow for rudimentary play between online players. Examples of such programs included Apprentice, Magic Workstation, Deck Daemon, CardMaster, XMage, and Cockatrice. These programs are not endorsed by Wizards of the Coast.

=== Novels ===
Harper Prism originally had an exclusive license to produce novels for Magic: The Gathering, and published ten books between 1994 and 1996. Around 1997, the license reverted to Wizards, and the company published its own novels to better tie these works to the expansion sets from 1998 to about 2011. A tie-in young adult novel, published by Penguin Random House, was announced for February 2026.

=== Short Stories ===
Wizards publishes short stories for Magic: The Gathering on its website, a successor to the novels, written largely in house. Stories are often related to sets set to come out, or characters within the setting. An audio version is also published alongside the stories.

=== Comics ===
In 1994, Wizards of the Coast gave an exclusive license to Armada Comics, an imprint of Acclaim Entertainment, to publish comic books. The comics were not developed in concert with the game and were created with divergent ideas to the game. However, "much of the lore established" by Armada Comics was "the foundation from which the rest of continuity was built. [...] Some of the details changed (or were 'retconned', in popular fan speak), but for the most part the core of these stories stayed the same". The comics came to a sudden end in 1996 when Acclaim started to run into financial trouble. In 1998, a new four-issue limited comic series was published by Dark Horse.

In September 2011, Hasbro and IDW Publishing accorded to make a four-issue mini-series about Magic: The Gathering with a new story but heavily based on MTG elements and with a new planeswalker called Dack Fayden, the story of which mainly developed in the planes of Ravnica and Innistrad. The series started in February 2012. In 2018, a four-issue mini-series on the planeswalker Chandra Nalaar was released. A sequel mini-series was announced in 2019, however, it was cancelled before publication.

In January 2021, Boom! Studios acquired the comic license of Magic: The Gathering and announced for a new Magic series for April 2021.

Between November 2018 and April 2025, a Japanese manga called Destroy All Humans. They Can't Be Regenerated. was serialized in Kadokawa Shoten's Monthly Shōnen Ace in cooperation with Wizards of the Coast. The story is not set in the Magic the Gathering universe, but rather set in the fictional Japanese town of Kamikawa in the late nineties. The series is published in English by Viz Media.

=== Film ===
In January 2014, 20th Century Fox acquired the rights to produce a Magic: The Gathering film with Simon Kinberg as producer and TSG Entertainment (its co-financing partner), and Allspark Pictures as co-financers, after Universal Pictures allegedly dropped the film from their schedule (both Universal and Hasbro had been developing the original Magic: The Gathering film since 2009). In June 2014, Fox hired screenwriter Bryan Cogman to write the script for the film. In 2019 following Disney's acquisition of 21st Century Fox's assets, the film along with numerous other properties in development at Fox were cancelled.

In April 2016, Enter the Battlefield, a documentary about life on the Magic Pro Tour was released. The film was written by Greg Collins, Nathan Holt, and Shawn Kornhauser.

The production team behind The Toys That Made Us will produce a documentary Igniting the Spark, The Story of Magic: The Gathering.

Hasbro and Legendary Entertainment announced a partnership in February 2025 for a live action film and television franchise based on MTG, starting with a feature film. In June 2025, Noah Gardner and Aidan Fitzgerald were hired as the writers of the film. In February 2026, Matt Johnson confirmed in an interview that he will direct the film. In November 2026, Maya Hawke was confirmed to star in the film in a major role.

=== Television series ===
In June 2019, Variety reported that Joe and Anthony Russo, Wizards of the Coast, and Entertainment One (then-owned by Hasbro) had teamed with Netflix for an animated Magic: The Gathering television series. In July 2019 at San Diego Comic-Con, the Russos revealed the logo of the animated series and spoke about doing a live-action series. During the Magic Showcase virtual event in August 2021, they revealed that Brandon Routh would be the voice of Gideon Jura, and that the series was slated to premiere sometime in 2023. The Russo brothers, along with Henry Gilroy and Jose Molina, have since separated from the project, and production has been entrusted to Jeff Kline. In October 2023, the series was briefly mentioned in a Hasbro investors meeting. In December 2023, Entertainment One was sold off to Lionsgate. In September 2024, Netflix announced the series has restarted development with Terry Matalas as showrunner and Hasbro Entertainment as production studio. The series was previewed at Annecy International Animation Film Festival in June 2025. In November 2026, the title of the series was revealed as Planeswalker and is set to be released in 2027.

=== Parodies ===
In 1998, PGI Limited created Havic: The Bothering, which was a parody of Magic: The Gathering. Wizards of the Coast, which owned the rights to Magic: The Gathering, took active steps to hinder the distribution of the game and successfully shut out PGI Limited from attending GenCon in July 1998. In an attempt to avoid breaching copyright and Richard Garfield's patent, each starter deck of Havic had printed on the back side, "This is a Parody", and on the bottom of the rule card was printed, "Do not have each player: construct their own library of predetermined number of game components by examining and selecting [the] game components from [a] reservoir of game components or you may infringe on U.S. Patent No. 5,662,332 to Garfield."

Five official parody expansions of Magic exist: Unglued, Unhinged, Unstable, Unsanctioned, and Unfinity. Most of the cards in these sets feature silver borders and humorous themes. The silver-bordered cards are not legal for play in WPN-sanctioned tournaments. In Unfinity, the silver border was replaced by a holo-foil acorn stamp (in place of the standard rare holo-foil stamp) to denote the same unplayable restriction. Unlike the previous parody sets, however, some Unfinity cards were not printed with an acorn stamp, and are thus legal for 'eternal' formats such as Commander and Legacy.

== Bibliography ==
- Flores, Michael J. (2006). Deckade: 10 Years of Decks, Thoughts and Theory. New York: top8magic.com. ISBN 978-0-9778395-0-6.
- Moursund, Beth (2002). The Complete Encyclopedia of Magic: The Gathering. New York: Thunder's Mouth Press. ISBN 978-1-56025-443-0.
- Waters, Anthony (1998). The Art of Magic: A Fantasy of World Building and the Art of the Rath Cycle. Renton, WA: Wizards of the Coast. ISBN 978-0-7869-1178-3.
