= Magic: The Gathering (1997 video game) =

1997 virtual card game

- Developer: MicroProse
- Publisher: MicroProse
- Producers: David Etheridge; Ned Way
- Designers: Todd Bilger; David Etheridge; Ned Way
- Artists: Murray Taylor; Michael Haire; Frank Frazier
- Composer: Roland J. Rizzo
- Platform: Microsoft Windows
- Release: NA: March 6, 1997; EU: 1997
- Genre: Digital collectible card game
- Modes: Single-player, multiplayer

Magic: The Gathering is a video game published by MicroProse in March 1997 based on the collectible card game Magic: The Gathering. It is often referred to as Shandalar, to distinguish it from other Magic video games since published, named after the plane of Shandalar where the game takes place. The player must travel the land and fight random enemies to gain cards, and defeat five wizards representing the five colors. The player must prevent one color from gaining too much power, and defeat the planeswalker Arzakon, who has a deck of all five colors. Adventure and role-playing elements are present, including inventory, gold, towns, dungeons, random battles, and character progression in the form of new abilities and a higher life point total. An oversized version of Aswan Jaguar was included in the game box.

Two related products were released, the expansion pack Spells of the Ancients and Duels of the Planeswalkers. Duels of the Planeswalkers was an improved version of the main game that did not require the original to be installed.

== Game mechanics ==
The game has several modes: a single-player campaign, and a duel or tournament against computer-controlled opponents. A ManaLink upgrade added a multiplayer feature enabling players to interact via Internet, modem, serial connection, or LAN. All share the same dueling interface, which is based on the mechanics of the real-life Magic: The Gathering card game. In Duel and Multiplayer modes, the game allowed a player to construct his or her own deck (using a specialized Deck Editor), or to play with a randomly generated deck (simulating a "fresh pack of cards" as was the custom in various tournaments at the time). The single-player campaign however required the player to participate in a large-scale quest, during which he or she would endeavor to gather cards and thus be able to construct more powerful playing decks, hopefully powerful enough to defeat the campaign's chief antagonists.

MicroProse signed a contract with Simutronics to provide online support for the game.

=== Duel mode ===
The card duel mode of the game attempts to simulate the experience of playing with actual Magic: The Gathering cards. The player is shown a tableaux that is divided into two halves - the lower half for the player's cards, and the upper half for the opponent's cards. Both players draw randomly from their own available cards (their personal "deck"), then proceed to play a standard game of Magic: The Gathering, based as closely as possible on Magic: The Gathering official rules. The match progresses in phases and turns, corresponding with the M:TG rule-set, with the program automatically skipping over certain phases when no action is possible and/or required. The player can set break-points to allow him or her to execute "fast-acting" spells or card abilities in case the program is not smart enough to automatically spot such possibilities. Each player's life-counter is displayed on their side of the playing field and will either rise or drop according to the progression of the game. The player can also rearrange his or her played cards to allow better visibility when the playing field becomes crowded, often during prolonged matches. When the card duel is initiated as part of the single-player campaign, special rules may apply. Often this includes a higher (or lower) life counter for one or both players, a card that appears at the start of the match for one or both players, or a global effect that influences both players (either beneficial or detrimental, often depending on the composition of either player's deck).

=== Single-player campaign mode ===
The single-player campaign is played mainly on an isometric representation of the game world, consisting of a randomly generated landscape dotted with terrain features and places of interest. The player initially selects a difficulty level (determines starting gold, cards, amulets and the life totals of "boss" enemies) and a preferred magical "color", and subsequently is given a predetermined deck, according to difficulty level and color chosen. The character is then transported to the world map, initiating the game. Travel across the world map is in real-time. The player moves the character across the landscape using simple mouse clicks, evading or intercepting enemies who themselves are predominantly interested in intercepting the player-character. Upon a successful interception, the game transitions into "duel" mode, wherein either the player competes against the encountered enemy using the Magic: The Gathering card game system, or pays the enemy an amount of gold to not duel. When dueling an enemy, a card or set of cards is often wagered, with particularly powerful enemies sometimes offering additional rewards beyond the waged cards. Some enemies have unique abilities that allow them to gain a specific advantage for the duration of the battle, while some enemies can summon up a surprise substitution to play in their stead (e.g., a more powerful enemy). The landscape is composed of patches of different types of terrain, corresponding with the five colors of the game world. Different terrain might offer benefits or hindrance to movement, including roads through all terrain types which allow rapid movement. Terrain also dictates the boundaries across which enemies may travel, as they have to adhere to terrain matching their own color(s). More importantly, each type of terrain offers a chance for special encounters to appear, often unique to one terrain type or another. Such encounters yield anything from combat to instant rewards, and often include riddles that require some knowledge of the various game cards.

The world map contains a large number of cities which can be visited, and these form the backbone for the game's underlying role-playing mechanics. Each city offers some cards for sale of a color matching the terrain around the city; the purchase of food (required to prevent slow-downs on the world map due to hunger); and often quests that usually involve reaching another city, acquiring a specific card, or defeating an enemy in the nearby area. These quests often has a reward at the end wherein the player will receive cards, hints to castle secrets or Mana links. Obtaining Mana links raises the player's life points. These Mana links can also be removed if the city in which they were obtained is overrun by a creature. Cities also buy cards from the player, allowing him or her to make money for the purchase of food, better cards and spend them in certain special areas (for example, to buy amulets from a Gem Bazaar). Some cities also offer special items that enhance player performance or allow the player to create special effects such as instant teleportation. Some of these effects, depend on the consumption of colored amulets that can be collected in various encounters, earned upon completion of quests, or purchased. These gems can also be traded for rarer cards (generally those of the same color as the amulet) at various towns. The landscape also contains a handful of dungeons whose locations can be discerned through various means, particularly the completion of quests and the defeat of powerful enemies. Within a dungeon, life lost in each duel carries over to all others, and other special rules will apply which could hinder or enhance a player's abilities. For example, a particular card could be permanently in effect. The dungeon interface is made up of a randomly generated series of perpendicular tunnels, with enemies placed in various locations and intersections. The player has freedom of movement within the tunnels while enemies remain stationary, but the player cannot pass through a spot taken by an enemy without initiating combat with that enemy. The tunnels also contain bonuses that can be picked up which provide a random effect, often bestowing extra life points or a free creature at the start of the next duel. Dungeons are important because of the special, valuable and powerful cards contained within that can be found nowhere else, frequently offering one of the Power Nine.

The player's primary goal is to destroy the five evil mages who are vying to cast the Spell of Dominion, which will enable them to conquer Shandalar. To accomplish this, the player must seek out and destroy the castle of each and every mage. Castles are played similarly to dungeons, except they contain no special cards but instead house the mage him/herself. If the mage is defeated in a duel, the mage and the castle are permanently destroyed. Until defeated, each mage regularly sends minions to attack cities on the map, which requires the player to react promptly, traveling to this city within the allotted time and defeating the minion in a duel. If the player fails, either by losing to the minion or taking too long to respond, the enemy mage will establish a mana link at the city, leaving the now much more powerful minion to stand guard. If any one mage establishes enough mana links (3 or 5, depending on whether or not the player possesses a certain item) to cast the "Spell of Dominion", which will bring the plane of Shandalar under their control, the game is lost. After defeating all five mages, the player then has to confront a final enemy who plays with cards of all five colors. This enemy has vastly more life points than any other enemy in the game. The amount of damage the player manages to do to this final boss before the fight ends constitutes the player's final score for the campaign.

== Development ==
The project to make Magic: The Gathering came during turbulent and troubled times at MicroProse, as it had recently lost a large amount of money pursuing unprofitable ventures (such as an arcade game business). A corresponding flight of personnel was happening as well. Sensing trouble with the Magic project, the famous and marquee Sid Meier was assigned to it. This game would be the last that Meier would ever work on with MicroProse, as he went on to found his own studio, Firaxis Games, shortly afterward.

The game features about an hour of full motion video for tutorials about the game. One of the actors in these videos was an early role for Rhea Seehorn. She stated in a 2025 interview that the production was low budget; instead of obtaining boots for them, the producers had Seehorn and other actors wear tube socks with tape around them to make them look like boots.

The game was single-player only upon release. MicroProse later released ManaLink, an upgrade enabling multiplayer, as both a free download and an included feature of the Duels of the Planeswalkers expansion pack.

The game had several notable bugs, the most prominent being a miscoding for the card Verduran Enchantress enabling a player to obtain a free draw when casting specific other cards, such as Giant Growth.

== Reception ==
In preparation for the game's launch, Spectrum HoloByte shipped 220,000 units to stores. Magic: The Gathering sold over 400,000 units by early 1999.

James V. Trunzo previewed Magic: The Gathering in White Wolf Inphobia #53 (March, 1995) and stated that "Considering the impact that Magic: The Gathering has had on the tabletop game industry, I can only speculate on its impact on the electronic game industry. The prospect of modem play alone makes this game worthwhile."

James V. Trunzo previewed Magic: The Gathering again in White Wolf Inphobia #57 (July, 1995) and stated that "Since my trip to Microprose, every other game on my computer is pale by comparison. I walk through the interactive demo that I now have at my disposal and then, Magic junky that I am, yearn for more. The most impressive feature about Magic: The Gathering for the computer really isn't anything that I've viewed or played. It's the game's potential for evolution. The multiplayer, on-line aspects of this product promise to make a dramatic impact on computer gaming as a whole. Its versatility and variety combines the best of the card game with the power of the computer."

Paul Pettengale reviewed Magic: The Gathering CD-Rom for Arcane magazine, rating it an 8 out of 10 overall, and stated that "Magic: The Gathering on CD-ROM is a joy to play. The PC is a worthy opponent, through there are difficulty levels to suit all players, from the beginner to the expert. What makes the game really special is the Shandalar adventure game which gives you an excuse to keep on playing. The only downside is that the number of cards used in the game is very limited compared with the number of cards there are out there in the real world."

Next Generation reviewed the PC version of the game, rating it two stars out of five, and stated that "The lack of multiplayer and oddly high system requirements will keep Magic: The Gathering from becoming a gaming classic or even one that fans of the genre will want. In the end, whether you're a fan of the card game or not, there are only two words to describe this release, and they're both 'mediocre.'"

GameSpot gave it a generally positive review, stating "This translation looks beautiful, plays decently, and has all the qualities - except the ability to play with other humans - that made the card game a hit."

Magic: The Gathering holds an 80% rating on GameRankings.

Magic: The Gathering was named the 35th best computer game ever by PC Gamer UK in 1997. The editors called it "very good indeed". In 2023, Dominic Tarason of PC Gamer included the game on a list of games that had "a huge impact on PC gaming". Tarason described the game as "[...] a revelation. Not only was it an excellent adaptation of the ascendant CCG, but it had a mind-bendingly expansive campaign mode named Shandalar, unprecedented for its time."

== Expansions ==
The Spells of the Ancients expansion pack was released on September 24, 1997. It included an upgrade of the game engine and interface, improved AI, and a sealed-deck tournament feature. It also added cards from the Alpha, Beta, and Unlimited base sets, the expansion sets Arabian Nights and Antiquities, and promotional cards distributed at DragonCon and with HarperPrism books. Some cards were omitted because they were unsuitable for computer play, including Chaos Orb and Shahrazad.

Duels of the Planeswalkers was an upgraded version of the original game released on January 14, 1998. Owners of the original game were eligible for a mail-in rebate. It included the original game, all of the upgrades included in Spells of the Ancients, and 80 new cards from the expansion sets Legends and The Dark.
