= Magic: The Gathering video games =

Several video games based on the Magic: The Gathering franchise exist for multiple systems. Some have attempted to translate the card game to electronic play nearly exactly; others have taken more liberties and drawn more from the setting than the actual rules of the card game. Benefits of successful video game versions of the card game include convenience, practice, and challenge. However, artificial intelligence for a game such as Magic is an extremely hard problem, and such software usually must be continuously updated to stay current with recently released card sets. Video game versions often expand on artwork, and may include unique cards that rely on randomness, effects which would be difficult or annoying to duplicate in real life.

== Magic: The Gathering ==
Named after the game itself, Magic: The Gathering was published by MicroProse in February 1997. The game takes place in the plane of Shandalar, where the player must travel the land and fight random enemies to gain cards, and defeat five wizards representing the five colors. The player must prevent any one color from gaining too much power, and defeat the planeswalker Arzakon, who has a deck of all five colors. Adventure game and role-playing game elements are present, including inventory, gold, towns, dungeons, random battles, and character progression in the form of new abilities and a higher life point total. Two expansion packs were published, Spells of the Ancients and Duels of the Planeswalkers.

The game is notable as being the last game Sid Meier (Civilization, Railroad Tycoon) worked on while employed by MicroProse, though his involvement was short. Meier left before development was complete to found Firaxis Games.

== Magic: The Gathering: BattleMage ==
Magic: The Gathering: BattleMage is a real time strategy game published in January 1997 by Acclaim for both PCs and PlayStation. It was also in development for the Sega Saturn, but this version was cancelled in mid-1997. In addition to the real time strategy game, BattleMage has a head-to-head mode. It is set on the continent of Corondor, where a planeswalker named Ravidel forces the most powerful mages to fight each other, so that he can eventually destroy them and conquer the land.

== Magic: The Gathering: Armageddon ==
Magic: The Gathering: Armageddon is an extremely rare arcade game published by Acclaim in 1997, somewhat similar to BattleMage. It is possible that as few as four machines were made. Acclaim's Mountain View, California-based coin-op division went out of business shortly after creating the game, so it never went into full production. GamePro reported that Armageddon was shown to their editors behind the scenes at the 1997 ASI show in Las Vegas, but did not appear on the show floor. The arcade board used 3dfx components and included 600 MB of RAM.

Gameplay is a cross between real time combat and strategy, with characters representing one of the five colors. White had healing and soldiers; Blue countermagic and water creatures; Black death and undead creatures; Red fire and mountain creatures; and Green elves and forest magic. The game was controlled with a trackball, and supported up to two players. Players could summon creatures to the arena as well as attack the opposing wizard directly.

The game can be played with the arcade game machine emulator MAME.

== Magic: The Gathering (Sega) ==
Magic: The Gathering is a Dreamcast game published and released by Sega in June 2001, though in Japan only. It takes place in the town of Magic Heart, the surrounding areas of Murg, Camat Island, Lydar Forest, Yeluk, Tornell, and The Balance Tower. It includes cards from 6th edition, Alliances, and Tempest. The game included 10 cards unique to it, generally utilizing random mechanics that would be difficult to implement in real-life card play.

== Magic: The Gathering Interactive Encyclopedia ==
The Magic: The Gathering Interactive Encyclopedia is an application and database of cards released by Wizards of the Coast. At its time of release, it contained up to the Mercadian Masques expansion; its database was updatable over the Internet, and continued to be updated by Wizards until the release of Judgment and Magic Online, which Wizards considered as superseding the Interactive Encyclopedia.

The encyclopedia includes a strategy information section and deck builder with pricing. It also included a free online play mode, albeit one lacking rules enforcement.

=== Reviews ===
- Realms of Fantasy

== Magic: The Gathering Online ==
Magic: The Gathering Online is a 2002 game developed by Leaping Lizard Software and maintained by Wizards of the Coast itself since version 2.0 in 2004. It focuses purely on gameplay, and includes no additional storyline. Included are cards from all expansions starting with Mirage with the exception of the sets Unhinged, Unglued, and Magic: The Gathering Conspiracy which would not easily translate to computer play. Updates become available as new sets are printed. Games are held in chatroom-style sessions, and virtual cards can be won or purchased with real money. Magic Online offers a variety of both casual games in which players can use cards they own for fun, and competitive online tournaments in which players use purchased/traded tickets and booster packs to enter into events, both Limited (decks built with cards opened from boosters) and Constructed (decks built from a player's collection).

== Magic: The Gathering – Battlegrounds ==
Magic: The Gathering – Battlegrounds is a game released in 2003 for both the PC and Xbox platforms, published by Atari. It was another attempt to do a real-time battling game, with wizards frantically running around casting spells. The Xbox version of the game offered downloadable creatures, arenas, and enchantments, though the PC version did not.

== Magic: The Gathering: Duels of the Planeswalkers ==
Magic: The Gathering: Duels of the Planeswalkers is a 2009 game for Xbox Live Arcade, Microsoft Windows, and PS3 developed by Stainless Games Ltd and published by Wizards of the Coast. It was released first on XBLA June 17, 2009, with a PC version released shortly after. It was announced on February 18, 2008, by way of a press release. Three expansion packs have been released on XBLA. A PS3 version was made available on the PlayStation Network in November 2010. Players are given pre-made decks they can play against an AI or against other humans online; new cards for these decks can be unlocked through play.

== Magic: The Gathering - Tactics ==
Magic: The Gathering - Tactics was an online turn-based strategy video game for the PC based on the card game that includes elements of positioning and map control. Tactics was developed and published by Sony Online Entertainment. The game was released for PC on January 18, 2011, and shut down on March 28, 2014.

== Magic: The Gathering – Duels of the Planeswalkers 2012 ==
Magic: The Gathering – Duels of the Planeswalkers 2012 is a follow-up to the 2009 Duels of the Planeswalkers for Xbox 360, PS3, and PC. It was released on June 15, 2011. It features a campaign mode with light story and a variety of pre-made decks for which additional cards can be unlocked through play. Like the original Duels of the Planeswalkers, the decks are made such that complicated timing windows are unnecessary and the choice of land tapping is generally irrelevant; this keeps the gameplay faster than Magic Online, which allows full deck customization.

== Magic: The Gathering – Duels of the Planeswalkers 2013 ==
Magic: The Gathering – Duels of the Planeswalkers 2013 is a followup to both previous Duels of the Planeswalkers titles, released June 20, 2012. In addition to Xbox 360, PS3, and PC, the game was also made available on iPad for the first time.

== Magic: The Gathering – Duels of the Planeswalkers 2014 ==
Magic: The Gathering – Duels of the Planeswalkers 2014 is the fourth installment in the Duels of the Planeswalkers series, released June 26, 2013. It introduced a new feature, "Sealed Play", which allows players to open virtual booster packs and build their own decks.

== Magic: The Gathering – Duels of the Planeswalkers 2015 ==
Magic: The Gathering – Duels of the Planeswalkers 2015 is the fifth installment in the Duels of the Planeswalkers series.

== Magic Duels ==
Magic Duels, originally titled Magic Duels: Origins, is the follow-up to Duels of the Planeswalkers. It includes a new model for monetization; unlike the earlier games, it is free to play. Unlike Magic: The Gathering Online, it is possible to earn cards via "grinding" rather than paying money. Origins was released on July 29, 2015.

== Magic: The Gathering – Puzzle Quest ==
Magic: The Gathering – Puzzle Quest is a mobile game based on the Puzzle Quest series of match-3 games, originally developed by Hibernum but taken over by Oktagon Games. It was first released in 2015. The player competes against computer-run opponents (either premade decks set by the game, or decks created by other players), matching tiles on a game board to generate mana that allows them to summon creatures and cast spells, with many of the game's other mechanics changed to be performed automatically by the game. Players can earn in-game rewards to get new cards or can acquire these through microtransactions.

== Magic: The Gathering Arena ==
Magic: The Gathering Arena is a free-to-play version of MtG, streamlined for quick online play and to be easily used for live streaming. It initially supported Constructed Deck play (using cards earned from boosters by winning games or through microtransactions) and Draft play. It was developed by Wizards' in-house studio, Magic Digital Studio. Arena is aimed to stay concurrent with the physical card game, with plans to release new expansions on the same day they are released physically.

== Magic: Legends ==
Magic: Legends was a free-to-play action role-playing game that was under development by Cryptic Studios and Perfect World Entertainment, but was canceled in June 2021. The game was previously billed as a massively multiplayer online role-playing game (MMORPG). Instead, as an action role-playing game, players control a Planeswalker using abilities that are drawn randomly from an arsenal based on Magic cards, with players able to gain access to new cards through completing quests or through microtransactions. The game launched an open beta preview version for Microsoft Windows in March 2021. While formal releases on Windows, PlayStation 4, and Xbox One were planned later in 2021, this did not come to fruition after negative feedback on the open beta, and the game was canceled. It became unavailable to players in October 2021 when the servers were closed.

== Untitled Commander format game ==
Hasbro announced in 2024 plans to develop a separate game around the Commander format, which allows for two or more players to compete with less restricted decks.
