= Masques Block (Magic: The Gathering) =

Block of expansion sets in Magic: The Gathering

Mercadian Masques
- Common set symbol for Mercadian Masques Expansion, in the form of a domino mask.
- Released: 4 October 1999
- Size: 350 (110 Common 110 Uncommon 110 Rare 20 Land)
- Keywords: None
- Mechanics: Mercenaries, Rebels, Spellshapers, alternate casting costs, depletion lands, storage lands
- Designers: Mike Elliott (lead), Bill Rose, Mark Rosewater
- Developers: Henry Stern (lead), Mike Elliott, Robert Gutschera, William Jockusch, Mark Rosewater with contributions from Charlie Tin Canno, and Beth Moursund
- Development code: Archimedes
- Expansion code: MMQ

First set in the Masques block
Mercadian Masques	Nemesis	Prophecy
← Urza's Destiny	Battle Royale →
← Urza Block	Invasion Block →

Nemesis
- Released: 14 February 2000
- Size: 143 cards (55 commons, 44 uncommons, 44 rares)
- Keywords: Fading
- Mechanics: Spellshapers, Rebels & Mercenaries
- Designers: Mike Elliot (lead), Bill Rose, Mark Rosewater
- Developers: Mike Elliot (lead), Charlie Catena, Paul Peterson, Teeuwyn Woodruff
- Development code: Euripides
- Expansion code: NEM

Second set in the Masques block
Mercadian Masques	Nemesis	Prophecy
← Battle Royale	Starter 2000 →
← Urza Block	Invasion Block →

Prophecy
- Released: 5 June 2000
- Size: 143 cards (55 commons, 44 uncommons, 44 rares)
- Mechanics: Rhystic spells
- Development code: Dionysus
- Expansion code: PCY

Third set in the Masques block
Mercadian Masques	Nemesis	Prophecy
← Starter 2000	Invasion →
← Urza Block	Invasion Block →

The Masquerade Cycle, sometimes incorrectly referred to as the "Masques block", is a Magic: The Gathering cycle (trilogy of expansions) that is set on the planes of Mercadia, Rath, and Dominaria. It consists of the expansion sets Mercadian Masques (4 October 1999, mask), Nemesis (14 February 2000, axe), and Prophecy (5 June 2000, crystals). Mercadian Masques was the first set that is not subject to the Wizards of the Coast Reprint Policy, meaning that none of its cards appear on its Reserved List.

== Storyline ==
=== Mercadian Masques ===
The crew of the Weatherlight, having just escaped from Rath, is now stranded on the plane/city of Mercadia. While they find a way to return to their home plane of Dominaria, it is revealed that one of their passengers—allegedly Takara—was actually Volrath in disguise.

=== Nemesis ===
Former Weatherlight crew members Ertai and Crovax have been left behind on Rath, where Volrath's absence leads to chaos and a power vacuum. Greven Il-Vec is next in the chain of command, but doesn't want a promotion, saying he'd "rather be the sword than the hand that wields it". The Phyrexians create an emissary, Belbe, from the remains of a fallen elf princess, and she is tasked with choosing Rath's next Evincar. She begins a sexual relationship with Ertai, who is slowly being corrupted by his abuse of a healing machine powered by black mana. Crovax, meanwhile, begs the Phyrexians to take his humanity and conscience away, and they are more than happy to assist. It seems that Crovax will be the next Evincar, until Volrath returns from Mercadia, and Belbe declares that the two must fight to the death for the position.

=== Prophecy ===
Keld has declared war on Jamuraa in order to reclaim "hero's blood", known also as tufa, which is a type of fossil fuel to run great machines. The city-states of Jamuraa form the Kipamu League and then repulse the invaders. The war bears a striking similarity to the Peloponnesian War between the Athenian Empire and the Peloponnesian League.

== Set details ==
=== Mercadian Masques ===
Mercadian Masques consists of 350 cards: 110 each of commons, uncommons, and rares plus 20 basic lands. It was the first large expansion to use the 6th Edition rules. This was the first set to have an accompanying fat pack. It reprinted a number of cards from previous sets, many of which have not been reprinted since. It was also the first set to have foil basic lands included in booster packs. The set was introduced in pre-release tournaments in September 1999 and released in early October.

=== Nemesis ===
Nemesis prerelease events were held on February 5, 2000. At these events the prerelease card, a foil Rathi Assassin, was handed out. The set was officially released on 14 February 2000. The 143 Nemesis cards come in three rarities, common, uncommon, and rare. 55 cards are common, 44 are uncommon, and 44 are rare. Nemesis booster packs include 15 cards, one rare, three uncommon, and eleven common. About every 100th card is a randomly inserted premium foil card. The company also sold four pre-constructed theme decks: Breakdown, Eruption, Mercenaries, and Replicator.Nemesis had a fair share of cards appear in well-placing tournament decks. Many of the cards with fading were quite powerful; the cards Parallax Wave, Parallax Tide, Blastoderm, Saproling Burst, and Tangle Wire all appeared in decks in various formats. Of the 143 in Nemesis none is a reprint. 22 cards from Nemesis have been reprinted afterwards, 16 in Core Sets.

=== Prophecy ===
The Prophecy expansion consists of 143 cards. When released, it was one of the least popular sets among tournament players. Though many casual players liked it because of the enormous Avatar and Winds cycle, both of which had a big effect at a big cost, it had relatively little impact on Standard tournaments. Magic head designer Mark Rosewater has also voiced his opinion, that Prophecy is the second-worst designed Magic set (behind Homelands) As of February 2012, only 21 cards from the Prophecy expansion have been reprinted.

== Keywords and mechanics ==
Unusually, Masques introduced no new keyword abilities to the game. However it was advertised as introducing new creature types, which were continued throughout the cycle: Two of these types were rebels and mercenaries, creatures able to search through their controller's library and "recruit" creatures of a specific type directly into play. Another type was spellshapers, creatures that had repeatable activated abilities that mimicked various classic spells, potentially turning otherwise useless cards into powerful effects. All of Masques's spellshapers required paying mana, tapping the creature and discarding a card to use their ability. Masques also reintroduced spells with alternative casting costs. This mechanic had not been used since Weatherlight.

In Nemesis, new Rebels, Mercenaries, and Spellshapers were added to the Mercadian Masques repertoire. The Flowstone creatures, originally introduced in Stronghold had another showing. Nemesis introduced the Fading mechanic, which had creatures enter the battlefield with X counters on it, but be placed into the graveyard after X turns. It again experiments with spells with a non-mana costs.

The main theme and mechanic of Prophecy was lands; specifically, whether lands were untapped or not. Many of its cards required sacrificing lands. Similarly, the Rhystic cards gave the player an advantage if no other players paid a certain amount of mana. Prophecy introduced no keyword mechanics.

== Reception ==
For years after its release, Mercadian Masques was considered to be an underpowered set. Reportedly, the designers were extremely gun-shy following the runaway power of the Artifacts Cycle, which had led to many banned cards. In response to the experience with the Artifacts Cycle, the developers of Mercadian Masques reduced the power of the set, resulting in a set that in its time was considered to be weak; the same phenomenon occurred with the later Mirrodin and Kamigawa blocks.

However, the set did produce a number of tournament-quality cards. Gush is restricted in Vintage and banned in Legacy. Food Chain combined with Goblin Recruiter from Visions to form a powerful combo deck that eventually led to Goblin Recruiter's banning from Legacy. In its time, Rishadan Port was a dominant mana-denial card in Standard and is still used for this purpose in Legacy. Other cards that still have impact on Legacy include primarily cards that can be cast without paying their mana cost such as Land Grant, Misdirection, and Unmask.

== Theme decks ==
Each of the Mercadian Masques theme decks has at least one spellshaper, a theme of the set. The pre-constructed theme decks are Deepwood Menace (green/red), Disrupter (black/red), Rebel's Call (white), and Tidal Mastery (blue/white).
