= Magic: The Gathering expansion sets, 1993–1995 =

The collectible card game Magic: The Gathering published seven expansion sets from 1993 to 1995, and one compilation set. These sets contained new cards that "expanded" on the base sets of Magic with their own mechanical theme and setting; these new cards could be played on their own, or mixed in with decks created from cards in the base sets. With Magic's runaway success, many of the printings of these early sets were too small to satisfy the rapidly growing fanbase. Cards from them became rare, hard to find, and expensive. It was not until Fallen Empires and Homelands that Wizards of the Coast was able to print enough cards to meet demand; additionally, Wizards of the Coast published Chronicles, a reprint set that helped fix many of the scarcity issues with the earliest sets.

In 1995, Magic would adopt a new paradigm: "blocks" of expansion sets. Multiple expansions would all take place in the same setting, and progress a storyline. This was first seen with Ice Age into Alliances, and evolved into a form that would last for many years in 1996–1997 with Mirage, Visions, and Weatherlight.

== Arabian Nights ==
Arabian Nights
- Released: December 1993
- Size: 92 cards (78 unique: 27 commons and 51 uncommons)
- Print run: 5,000,000
- Keywords: None new
- Mechanics: Lands with abilities, djinns and efreets, metagame effects, coin-flip effects
- Designers: Richard Garfield
- Developers: Jim Lin, Chris Page, Dave Pettey, Skaff Elias
- Development code: Arabian Nights
- Expansion code: ARN (AN)
← Unlimited	Antiquities →

Arabian Nights was the first Magic: The Gathering expansion set, published in 1993. The set is composed entirely of new cards. The expansion symbol of Arabian Nights is a scimitar.

The setting of Arabian Nights is inspired by the themes and characters of the Thousand and One Arabian Nights with some of the characters and places coming directly from these tales. The Arabian Nights also provides the flavor text for most of the cards in the set. Arabian Nights stands out as being one of the only two card sets primarily based on public domain real-world fiction (the other being Portal Three Kingdoms), as opposed to other card sets based on settings created exclusively for Magic.

Richard Garfield, Magic creator, acted as the sole designer for the set, and developed it in parallel with other teams working on what would become Ice Age and Mirage. The Ice Age design team, composed of Jim Lin, Chris Page, Dave Pettey, and Skaff Elias, was called upon to become the development team for Arabian Nights as well, but instead of playtesting the set they managed only to submit some comments because their schedule was so tight. At that point in Magic's development, the role of expansions was relatively undefined, and Garfield intended for Arabian Nights cards to bear a purple and gold back that would allow players to exclude Arabian Nights from their games. In his article, "The Making of Arabian Nights", Garfield cites this as his inspiration to "be more adventurous in creating mechanics and themes".

Player response against the proposed new back caused Wizards of the Coast to stay with the original backs, allowing cards from various sets to be mixed freely in gameplay. To replace the new card back, a symbolic scimitar was added between the card artwork and card text, making the first expansion symbol; every expansion set since has displayed a unique one.

=== Cards ===
Arabian Nights booster packs contain eight cards, two from the uncommon sheet and six from the common sheet. The set as a whole consists of 78 cards. Nineteen of these cards are U3, meaning they appear three times on the uncommon sheet, and 32 cards are U2 and are thus usually dubbed the rares of the set, although they are only 33% less common than U3 cards. Of the commons 9 are C5 and 16 are C4. Additionally the Arabian Nights Mountain is C1 and Desert is C11. When counting the commons with smaller, darker mana symbols as separate cards Arabian Nights is a set of 92 cards. The smaller darker numbers in the casting cost are referred to as series (a) and the lighter and larger numbers are referred to as series (b).

Of the 78 cards, 49 have been reprinted. With 63% reprinted, Arabian Nights is second in fraction of cards reprinted in an expansion set only to Antiquities. Twenty-two of the 29 cards that have not been reprinted are on the Reserved List, meaning that Wizards of the Coast has decided never to reprint these, for concern of alienating collectors. On the other hand, the Mountain, accidentally not removed from Arabian Nights, is the only card of the set that had been printed before. It is thus the first reprint in Magic outside a base set.

Arabian Nights includes a few minor collation and typographical errors. One of them was the so-called "Arabian Mountain". When the decision was made to have the expansion sets fully playable with the basic set, Wizards of the Coast decided that there was no need to include basic lands in the print run, so they were removed. However, one Mountain basic land card accidentally remained on the print sheet as a common, in a slot intended for a Desert card. Due to this oversight, the Mountain is now the most common Magic card. Wizards noted that there were just under 31,000 Arabian Nights Mountain cards printed. Another error, this time in printing, caused two different styles of generic mana symbols to be printed on some cards. Some copies of these cards feature a regular sized generic mana symbol, other copies have one that is smaller and darker.

=== Design ===
Even when separated from its place as Magic's first expansion, Arabian Nights was a groundbreaking set in terms of its impact on the game. In his article "It Happened One Nights", Mark Rosewater detailed among others the following innovations or expansions on Alpha mechanics:

- Stealing opponent's cards – Alpha enabled players to gain control of their opponent's permanents, but Arabian Nights explored this theme further.
- Opponent-activated abilities – Ifh-Bíff Efreet has an ability that each player can activate. This theme was further explored with the Mongers in Mercadian Masques.
- Lands with abilities – Arabian Nights was the first set with Lands that had abilities other than mana abilities.
- Coin flips – Arabian Nights was the first set that made use of coin flips to introduce additional randomness to the game.
- Cumulative upkeep & cantrips (cards that draw a new card when played) – Both concepts were more formally introduced in Ice Age, but Arabian Nights made use of these on Cyclone and Jeweled Bird, respectively.
- Lifelink – The concept of the ability that would become Lifelink was first introduced on Arabian Nights' El-Hajjâj.
- Exile zone as a Limbo – Oubliette was the first card to use what would eventually come to be called the Exile zone as a holding zone for cards temporarily out of play. It would later be errata'd to use the phasing mechanic seen in the Mirage expansion.

=== Storyline ===
Richard Garfield considered several mythologies to build Magic's first expansion around, but eventually decided to use a real-world mythos. Personally fascinated with the One Thousand and One Nights mythos, and inspired by the recent Sandman comic by Neil Gaiman, "Ramadan", he decided that it fit the game well and chose to employ it for Magic. Aside from using the original tale as an inspiration for the cards of Arabian Nights and putting short quotes from the book on the cards as flavor text the set originally had no own background story. In 1995–96 two comic books (A Time to Gather and And Then There Was One) were produced by Armada to give the set its own storyline, taking place on the plane of Rabiah the Infinite. Arabian Nights is one of the two sets (the other Portal: Three Kingdoms) to use an explicit earthbound mythos for its background story, although many other sets are inspired or loosely flavored by real-earth cultures (e.g. Norse cultures in Ice Age, African cultures in Mirage, Eastern Europe in Ravnica, etc.).

=== Notable cards ===
- Shahrazad — The effect to create subgames is unique in Magic and eventually led to the banning of this card from all tournament formats as it was perceived to consume too much time in tournaments. In his article "The Making of Arabian Nights" Richard Garfield called Shahrazad his favorite card from Arabian Nights also due to its unique effect.
- Juzám Djinn — This card was long considered to be the best creature in Magic. While its power level has since been diminished (the almost identical Plague Sliver thirteen years later saw little tournament play), it was memorably powerful at the time. The art of Juzám Djinn is also widely considered to be one of the most iconic of the early Magic game. Wizards of the Coast used it as a cover piece for their first Magic encyclopedia (along with Black Lotus and Balduvian Horde).
- Bazaar of Baghdad — Drawing two cards only to discard three appears not to be a powerful effect at the first glance in a game where card advantage is a well established principle, but in Vintage there are several ways to make use of cards discarded, especially with the Dredge mechanic from Ravnica: City of Guilds.
- Library of Alexandria — The Library has been a staple of Vintage decks for years. For some time Vintage players even referred to the Power Nine as Power Ten to include the card. Library of Alexandria is restricted in Vintage and not legal to play in any other format.
- Kird Ape — Kird Ape is one of the most powerful one-mana creatures of the game's early life. When played alongside Taiga, it was a 2/3 potentially on the first turn of the game, which led to it being on the first list of banned cards for the Extended format.
- City in a Bottle — Originally, Richard Garfield wanted to use different card backs for Arabian Nights, so that each set could stand on its own and that players could have the option of playing only with the sets that they liked. After this idea was vetoed, City in a Bottle was an intended "safeguard" that if a player didn't want to play with Arabian Nights cards, they had a card that could stop the entire expansion.
- Mountain — Basic land. The Arabian Nights set was not intended to have basic lands, but one "mountain" card was printed in the set by mistake.

== Antiquities ==
Antiquities
- Anvil
- Released: March 1994
- Size: 100 cards (41 commons and 59 uncommons)
- Print run: 15,000,000
- Keywords: None new
- Mechanics: Artifacts, artifact effects
- Designers: Skaff Elias, Jim Lin, Dave Petty, Joe Mick, and Chris Page
- Development code: Antiquities
- Expansion code: ATQ (AQ)
← Arabian Nights	Revised →

Antiquities is the second Magic: The Gathering expansion set. It was the first set to have a backstory unique to Magic that explores the mythos of the Magic universe. The story is primarily about the brothers Urza and Mishra who are inseparable at first, but become sworn enemies over the finding of two power stones. Trying to get hold of the other's stone they eventually lay waste to the whole continent of Terisiare. The set was created by the group of students at the University of Pennsylvania that had helped Richard Garfield design the original game. Mechanically Antiquities revolves around artifacts. Only 35 of the 85 different cards are colored, the remaining 50 cards being artifacts and lands. The expansion symbol for Antiquities was an anvil.

Antiquities managed to solve many of the printing errors that had plagued previous sets, although the expansion symbol was missing from the card Reconstruction, and the circle around the activation cost of Tawnos's Weaponry was omitted in half the printing. The only major problem noticed by players was the poor collation of the set; many booster boxes contained several packs with exactly the same cards in each, making it difficult for players in many areas to collect complete sets. To correct this, Wizards of the Coast introduced a "buyback" program, allowing players to trade in their excess cards for money.

=== Storyline ===
The storyline of Antiquities is originally told through the flavor text of the cards in the set. It is given in full in the 1998 novel "The Brothers' War" written by Jeff Grubb. In 1999 the prequel, "The Thran" by J. Robert King, appeared. It describes the events leading to the Thran-Phyrexian War and the conflict itself. The Thran are the civilization that created the powerstones that are the cause of the separation and ensuing conflict of Urza and Mishra.

The story of Antiquities takes place on the plane of Dominaria and centers on the two brothers Urza and Mishra. Urza is born on the first day of the year 0 AR and his brother, Mishra, on the final day of that year. Ten years later, when their father falls ill, they are sent as apprentices to their father's friend, the artificer Tocasia. After several years at Tocasia's camp where the brothers made several inventions and discoveries, they explore the Caves of Koilos, a place filled with Thran artifacts. There the brothers each find one half of a powerstone that sealed the gate to the plane of Phyrexia, which is also located in the caves. Mutual desire for the other's piece of the powerstone eventually leads them to turn the power of their stones onto each other. Attempting to end the duel, Tocasia puts herself into the middle, leading to her inadvertent death.

Afterwards, the brothers separate and leave the excavation site. In the following years, Urza and Mishra come into positions of substantial power in Yotia and amongst the Fallaji people, respectively. After some hostilities, the empires eventually conduct open warfare against each other. The events during the conflict lead to both Urza and Mishra acquiring the leadership amongst their people. The conflict becomes an all-out war, but no side is able to gain the upper hand. In the final battle of the conflict, both armies fight to a standstill. Eventually, Urza activates the Golgothian Sylex, an artifact that Urza's lieutenant Tawnos received from Mishra's lieutenant Ashnod. The activation of the artifact triggers a blast that destroys the site of the last battle, the island of Argoth, and thus ends the war by destroying both armies. In the aftermath of the conflict, the blast triggered by the Golgothian Sylex upsets the climate of Dominaria leading to an Ice Age. The culmination of Urza's and Mishra's conflict was expanded upon further in the 1998 expansion set Urza's Saga.

=== Rarity ===
Antiquities cards were sold in booster packs that contain eight cards, two from the uncommon sheet and six from the common sheet. Of the cards in Antiquities, 29 are U3, meaning that they appear three times on the uncommon print sheet. 4 are U2, and the remaining 26 uncommons are U1. These are usually dubbed the rares of the set. Also the card Tawnos's Weaponry, a U2, exists in two versions, one barely noticeably missing the circle behind the activation cost of the ability. For collectors' purposes, Tawnos's Weaponry is thus sometimes counted as two U1 cards. Of the commons, 25 are C4. The remaining commons are 5 C2 and 11 C1. The C1 commons are usually dubbed as uncommons, as a C1 card is exactly as rare as a U3 card.

=== Notable cards ===
Despite Antiquities design as a set revolving around artifacts, it was largely the lands from the set that had most impact on the game.

- Mishra's Factory – This was the first land that could turn into a creature. Its design had a strong impact on later lands that are able to become creatures (called "man lands"), leading to the design of the Urza's Legacy man lands and eventually the Worldwake and Oath of the Gatewatch man lands. Along with Strip Mine and the Urzatron lands, Mishra's Factory is also the first non-basic land card with varying artwork (Spring, Summer, Autumn, and Winter).
- Mishra's Workshop – The Workshop is a mainstay of many Vintage decks today due to its ability to provide its controller with a lot of mana quickly. Mishra's Workshop is banned from Legacy play, but the card is not restricted in Vintage.
- The Urzatron Lands – Urza's Mine, Urza's Power Plant, and Urza's Tower. When combined, these lands can add 7 mana to their controller's mana pool. While it is unlikely to draw all three cards early from a deck of sixty cards, decks built around searching for any playing pieces of 'Tron' have been powerful tournament decks in the Standard and Extended formats. Most notably a combo deck built around Tooth and Nail was one of the strongest Standard decks for more than a year. Urzatron lands are also used in Modern decks that aim to assemble Tron quickly using Expedition Map and Sylvan Scrying to quickly cast threats such as Karn Liberated or Wurmcoil Engine.
- Strip Mine - With the ability to destroy any land on the battlefield, this card is banned in all sanctioned formats except Vintage, where it is restricted to one copy per deck.

== Legends ==
Legends
- Capital of a Doric column
- Released: June 1994
- Size: 310 cards
- Print run: 35,000,000
- Keywords: Bands with other, Rampage
- Mechanics: Legendary permanents, Enchant Worlds, Multicolor cards
- Designers: Steve Conard and Robin Herbert
- Developers: Skaff Elias, Jim Lin, Chris Page, Dave Pettey
- Development code: Legends
- Expansion code: LEG (LE)
← Revised	The Dark →

Legends was the third Magic: The Gathering expansion set, released in June 1994. It was the first expansion set to be sold in packs of 15 (previous expansions had been sold in packs of 8). The set was designed by Wizards of the Coast co-founder Steve Conard and friend Robin Herbert in Canada before the game was initially released. Legends introduces several mechanics and keywords to the game, most prominently the namesake mechanic of Legends: multicolored creatures of which there could only be one in play at a time. These were the first multicolored cards in the game. The expansion symbol for Legends is the capital of a column.

Legends did not have the printing errors and misleading artist credits that existed in preceding Magic sets. The problem of poor collation persisted, though, which had also troubled Antiquities. Each booster box contained only half of the uncommon cards in the set. This along with the comparatively small printing made collecting the entire 310-card set very difficult. Wizards of the Coast implemented a card exchange program for US customers that ran until August 1994, replacing up to 100 cards per shipment.

Legends is the oldest expansion to have been printed in a foreign language; the Italian Leggende was released in 1995, shortly after L'Oscurità (Italian The Dark). These two expansions were released in the opposite order in their original English printings. The first set to be released in a foreign language was the Revised Edition which was printed not only in Italian, but also in German and French.

This set had a few misprints:

- The card All Hallow's Eve was printed as a Sorcery instead of as an Enchantment.
- The name of the card Ærathi Berserker was misprinted, omitting the leading ligature character because the chosen typeface lacked a glyph representing the Æ of its name.
- The text for the card Imprison had a misplaced gray dot background for a mana cost.

=== Storyline ===
The story line of the Legends set was not formulated until the three Legends Cycle books by Clayton Emery were released in 2001 and 2002. It follows the adventures of Hazezon Tamar who teams up with many other legends from the set such as Jedit Ojanen. The story takes place in the southern regions of Terisiare well after the Ice Age, and sometime before Weatherlight as the first Airships are built by Johan who tried to conquer the entire continent. Many other legends of the set end up fighting Johan's army at the battle for Efrava.

=== Mechanics ===
Legends introduce several important mechanics to the game and each pack of cards contained a rules card explaining the new mechanics and keywords.

- Legends – A new type of creature with a special restriction: there can only be one Legend in play, as they were flavored as unique heroes and specific places, not interchangeable armies or territory. Briefly, only one copy was allowed per deck when Legends came out, but this restriction was quickly modified to merely one in play. Legends provided both Legendary Creatures and Legendary Lands, while Legendary Artifacts and Enchantments would not be printed until Odyssey and Champions of Kamigawa, respectively. When printed, if a second Legend would come into play, it would instead go to the graveyard; this would be modified many years later to "both are destroyed" in Champions of Kamigawa. This would later be further modified to only check uniqueness within each player's battlefield individually, rather than the game as a whole, and that if a second Legendary permanent would come into play, its controller can choose which one to keep.
- Enchant World – Enchantments that enchanted the entire "world." These enchantments would have an effect that affected all players at the same time and were limited to only one in play at a time.
- Multicolor – Legends was the first set to include cards that required more than one color of mana to play. These cards were distinguished by a gold background and proved popular enough to be a common mechanic in later sets.
- Rampage – An ability that took effect whenever said creature became blocked by more than one creature. Creatures with Rampage would get a bonus to their power and toughness for each creature blocking it beyond the first.
- Banding and Bands With Other – A game mechanic that was eventually dropped from the game after Weatherlight, banding allowed multiple creatures to attack as a single unit, allowing the attacking player to decide how damage was distributed to his or her creatures, if the defending player blocked. Legends featured the "bands with other" mechanic, creating creatures that banded with any creatures of a certain type, and was the only set to feature this with the exception of the Unhinged card Old Fogey.
- Poison – The ability of certain creatures to inflict poison, a separate kind of damage distinct from life total; ten poison counters causes the game to instantly be lost.

=== Rarity ===
Legends is the first Magic expansion to have cards of three explicit rarities: commons, uncommons, and rares. There are 75 common cards in Legends. Of these, 46 are C2, meaning that they appear two times on the print sheet, and are thus twice as common as the other 29 C1 commons. Seven of the 114 uncommons are U2, and all other 107 uncommons are U1. Of the 121 rares, each is R1, making them all equally prevalent.

=== Notable cards ===
Legends has a reputation for having an erratic power level and not being balanced particularly finely. Notably, the designers made extremely powerful spells that could lock opposing creatures out of the game entirely such as The Abyss and Moat, but extremely weak creatures. The result was a combination of some of the weakest cards in Magic as well as the most potent.

- Mana Drain – Better than the original Counterspell from Alpha, this card is a staple of Vintage decks and banned in Legacy for power level reasons. It became even stronger after the "mana burn" rule was removed from the game, which damaged players for unspent mana.
- The Tabernacle at Pendrell Vale – This land is highly sought after for the "lands" archetype deck in Legacy. When it was originally printed, it was not particularly useful due to creature decks not being particularly viable. This meant that players did not save the card or treat it as valuable. As new cards were printed over time, Tabernacle became more useful, but copies of it are now difficult to find and the card has become by far the most valuable card of Legends.
- Moat – Moat is a powerful enchantment that stops all non-Flying creatures from attacking, rendering them useless until an opponent can remove Moat itself. Moat was featured in one of the first true "control" decks of the game alongside Serra Angel.
- Chain Lightning – This card is less powerful than the original Lightning Bolt, but it is still strong.
- Karakas – Originally an unnoticed uncommon, Karakas came to the spotlight as the Legacy format grew in popularly. In that format Karakas serves to return a powerful Legendary creature such as Iona, Shield of Emeria, Emrakul, the Aeons Torn, and Mangara of Corondor to its owner's hand. Because of its utility and power, Karakas is banned in the Commander format (also known as Elder Dragon Highlander) format where Legendary Creatures are much more common.
- Wood Elemental – Considered by many to be the worst creature of all time and one of the worst Magic cards ever printed. The restrictions on this creature make it unfeasible in almost every situation.
- The Abyss – At one point considered the best reusable creature kill spell ever, The Abyss locks out opposing creature decks efficiently.
- Pit Scorpion – This was the first creature ever introduced that dealt poison damage, a strategy that countered life gain decks.
- "Banding lands" (Adventurers' Guildhouse, Cathedral of Serra, Mountain Stronghold, Seafarer's Quay, and Unholy Citadel) – These lands are considered among the weakest cards ever printed. They conditionally grant "Bands with Other Legends", and nothing else.

=== Reception ===
Legends won the Origins Award for Best Game Accessory of 1994.

== The Dark ==
The Dark
- Eclipsed Moon
- Released: August 1994
- Size: 119 cards
- Print run: 63,000,000 or 75,000,000
- Mechanics: Sacrifice, Tribal, Poison
- Designers: Jesper Myrfors
- Development code: The Dark
- Expansion code: DRK (DK)
← Legends	Fallen Empires →

The Dark was the fourth expansion set of Magic: The Gathering, released in August 1994. The set continued the story begun in Antiquities and recounted the aftermath of the events of that set. The 119-card expansion explored the darker sides of the colors of Magic. Unlike its predecessor Legends, it did not introduce any new keywords, but did include a number of themes including sacrifice, Goblin tribal, and colors "hosing" themselves (flavored as betrayal). The expansion symbol for The Dark is an eclipsed moon. It was released in 8-card booster packs, of which 2 cards were from the uncommon sheet and 6 cards from the common sheet; 43 uncommons were printed twice as often in the uncommon sheet as 35 rares.

The Dark was the first Magic expansion that was released in a foreign language. It was published in English and in Italian under the name L'Oscurità. Despite being the first set that was translated to Italian, it is not the oldest set that was translated. After the release of the Italian The Dark, Legends was also published in Italian.

Misprints for this set include the card Gaea's Touch, which had its text shifted to the left, and Runesword, which has a black diagonal line through the text box as a result of a hair on the printing plate. Cards with artwork by Dennis Detwiler were inadvertently credited to Denise Detwiler.

=== Creation and development ===
The Dark was designed by Jesper Myrfors, who was also the art director for Magic at Wizards of the Coast at the time. He started the project on his own initiative. In the early days of Magic, the game was a runaway success that Wizards had not been prepared for. Sets were commissioned on a far more ad-hoc basis. Myrfors figured that presenting a mostly-finished set ready for printing would likely receive quick approval from management. He personally designed the set, both the cards and in commissioning the artwork.

As the title suggests, the setting of the set is something of a fantasy "Dark Ages", a period of collapse in the aftermath of the Brother's War (depicted in the set Antiquities). One of the themes Myrfors wanted to explore was religious extremism, and in particular White's potential as a villainous color. He was in particular inspired by the Satanic panic of the 1980s and early 90s, still fresh in memory in 1994. White had received largely positive treatment in early Magic sets, and Myrfors wanted to explore the dangerous sides of zealotry and bigotry to the color when religion is weaponized for evil agendas. Other colors also received cards hinting at strange and mysterious happenings, and a general air of desperation.

=== Storyline ===
The storyline of The Dark was initially only told through the flavor texts of the cards. However, in 1999 the first novel in the Ice Age cycle, The Gathering Dark by Jeff Grubb, was released. The book tells the story of Jodah, one of the protagonists of the storyline of The Dark.

In the aftermath of the Brothers' War, a series of conflicts ends up causing most of the inhabitants of the continent of Terisiare to revert to a more primitive state. During this time, several leaders and notable heroes rise up, such as Vervamon the Elder (who was later burned at the stake), Maeveen O'Donahough, Barl the Artificer, Mairisil the Pretender, and Lord Ith (who was held captive by Mairsil).

After the destruction of large amounts of the continent Terisiare during the Brothers' War, most nations turn heavily to religion and magic to help them cope with the coming ice age caused by the detonation of the Golgothian Sylex, creating a climate change similar to that of a nuclear winter. Mairsil the Pretender, the advisor to an unnamed king, imprisons Lord Ith in the device called "Barl's Cage" (a mage-prison built by his chief artificer, Barl) and wages war in the "Dark Lands", areas of Terisiare overcome with black mana influence. Lord Ith summons a rag man to find someone to free him. Mairsil is obsessed with finding a gateway to Phyrexia, and when a young mage named Jodah arrives, he tries to manipulate the boy to take him there.

During these times, he employs Maveen O'Donahough and her troop of mercenaries, who go out to scout, search and destroy, and undertake other various missions. They are accompanied by Vervamon the Elder, an elderly sage who records parts of their travel and takes down bits of important lore. However, when he returns, he is branded a heretic and burned at the stake as a martyr. Eventually, Jodah frees Lord Ith as Mairsil begins to lose his power, caused by the weakening of the land by the coming ice age.

=== Mechanics ===
The Dark introduced no new mechanics. However, it did utilize several themes that would be used later on in Magic sets, especially the payment of life to activate abilities.

- "Sacrifice", where a player has to sacrifice something to gain the upper hand against an opponent, usually life or creatures. Blood of the Martyr and Brothers of Fire are examples.
- "Tribal", a theme that would later be more prominent in Magic, had a presence here, largely in the Goblin tribe. Cards such as Goblin Caves and Goblin Shrine boosted Goblins, while Tivadar's Crusade destroyed them.
- "Cooperation of enemy colors", where cards interacted favorable with enemy colors such as Elves of Deep Shadow.
- "Self-hosing", where cards were good against their own color. Ashes to Ashes allowed black to destroy black creatures (something Black had trouble doing before), while Water Wurm and Hidden Path were more direct. Martyr's Cry shows white turning against its own white creatures.

=== Notable cards ===
The Dark has a reputation for having a somewhat weak power level compared to earlier sets, and slowed the speed of the game down. Initial problems with powerful cards in earlier sets had led Magic designers to more closely tune cards for balance.

- Ball Lightning – One of the iconic red creatures in early Magic, Ball Lightning has been reprinted several times and spawned multiple imitator cards in later sets that were also one-shot attacks with haste, such as Blistering Firecat and Groundbreaker.
- Blood Moon – This was the first card that penalized players for using non-basic lands. It was designed from a top-down flavor perspective that flooding the land with red light should transform lands to produce red mana. It has proved a staple in the Modern format, and sees occasional play in Legacy as well.
- Maze of Ith – Although The Dark generally has a rather low power level, Maze of Ith quickly made it to the lists of restricted cards. Unlike today, even Standard had a restricted list back then, but Maze of Ith was on the Vintage restricted list for some time as well. Maze of Ith has a somewhat strange rarity; it is the 44th uncommon in the set, but does not appear on the uncommon sheet. Instead, it appeared on the common sheet, but 1/3 as often as the actual commons. As a result, it was printed somewhat more than the other uncommons, although still less than the commons.
- Tormod's Crypt – This zero cost card can completely remove a graveyard. It is thus a useful sideboard card, so that a deck can deal with graveyard strategies.
- Sorrow's Path – This card is widely regarded as being one of the worst land cards ever printed. Its main use is to be given to an opponent somehow.

=== Reviews ===
- Rollespilsmagasinet Fønix (Danish) (Issue 4 - September/October 1994)

== Fallen Empires ==
Fallen Empires
- Crown
- Released: November 1994
- Size: 102 cards (functionally different) / 187 cards (counting distinct artwork)
- Print run: 350–375 million
- Keywords: None new
- Mechanics: Creature tokens, "Tribal" creature types, Counters
- Designers: Skaff Elias, Jim Lin, Dave Petty and Chris Page
- Development code: Fallen Empires
- Expansion code: FEM (FE)
← The Dark	4th Edition →

Fallen Empires was the fifth Magic: The Gathering expansion set, released in November 1994. Out of the set of 187 cards, 102 were functionally unique, with the remainder being variant illustrations of other cards in the set. The mechanics of Fallen Empires include a tribal subtheme and heavy use of counters and tokens. Thematically, the set experiments with conflict within the colors. The expansion symbol for the set is a crown.

Similar to The Dark, Fallen Empires is widely regarded as an overall weak set in power level. The set "with mixed reviews from players, and controversy over the set's effectiveness still rages on." The set's large printing meant the individual price of each card on the secondary market was comparatively inexpensive, fueling perceptions of a weak power level. Still, the set has its proponents, who note its strong flavor and good commons. Richard Garfield described it at the time as "easily the most complicated and best-looking of the expansions. The play value is high for the complexity, and the cards are very valuable for play. The flavor is probably the most cohesive since Arabian Nights. This expansion is easily my favorite."

=== Storyline ===
Fallen Empires takes place on the continent of Sarpadia after the Brothers' War in Antiquities. Each of the major cultures on Sarpadia is confronted with internal threats caused by the cooling weather: the dwarves are attacked by orcs and goblins; the Vodalian merfolk face the homarid menace; the elves of the forest struggle to contain the fungus-like Thallids of their own creation; the proud soldiers of Icatia confront opposition from religious zealots; and the dark Order of the Ebon Hand fights a thrull revolt. The storyline of Fallen Empires is continued in the Ice Age set.

=== Printing and distribution ===
Fallen Empires was released in November 1994. It was sold in boosters of eight cards with a box of boosters containing sixty booster packs. Each booster contained two cards from the uncommon and six from the common sheet. Of the cards from the uncommon sheet, 36 were functionally rares (U1) and appeared once on the uncommon sheet. They were three times as rare as most other uncommons. The remaining uncommons were 25 U3 and 5 U2 cards. Of the common cards, each is equally common if each card with a unique artwork is counted as an individual card. Counting only functionally unique cards, there were 15 common cards that appeared in four versions and 20 that appeared in three versions. There was also one common, Delif's Cone, that had only one version, making it just as rare as an U3 uncommon.

Because previous sets were underprinted, often making them unavailable very quickly after they went on sale, more Fallen Empires cards were printed than any previous set. Wizards of the Coast announced the print run of Fallen Empires to be 350–375 million cards, compared to 75 million for its predecessor, The Dark. Booster packs were thus available until 1998, despite the fact that Wizards stopped shipping cards in January 1995.

Fallen Empires was the last set produced only in English, although the two previous sets, Legends and The Dark, had already been produced in Italian. Its successor, Ice Age, was available in six languages.

Due to a printing error, a small number of cards from Fallen Empires were printed with Wyvern backs when that game was manufactured at the same factory. These were distributed in Wyvern starters and have an exceptionally high value on the secondary market relative to other Fallen Empire cards.

=== Mechanics ===
Fallen Empires introduced a tribal theme that would later be revisited in Onslaught. Each color had two main creature types, as well as cards that benefit from controlling creatures of those types. Another theme introduced was internal strife within each color. Each color had two major tribes, one of the rulers, and another lesser or enslaved force; the lesser force rebels against or escapes control of the old rulers in each storyline, causing their collapse—hence, the Fallen Empires.

- White: Icatia and its Order of Leitbur face zealots of the Farrelite Cult.
- Blue: The Merfolk of Vodalia deal with the rise of the crab-like Homarids.
- Black: The Order of the Ebon Hand faces a rebellion by its enslaved Thrulls.
- Red: An unnamed Dwarven Kingdom is overrun by Goblins and Orcs.
- Green: The Elves are overwhelmed by the rampant growth of fungus-like Thallids.

A number of Fallen Empires cards also made heavy usage of counters and tokens, leading the company to publish a sheet of cardboard counters in the game's companion magazine The Duelist.

=== Notable cards ===
- Hymn to Tourach – This powerful discard spell has seen a large amount of tournament play in formats where it is legal.
- High Tide – Various combo decks have been built around the mana acceleration that this card provides.
- Goblin Grenade – One of the earliest incentives to play a deck with many Goblin cards.
- Order of Leitbur and Order of the Ebon Hand – For their mana efficiency, protection from respective colors and combat oriented abilities, these clerics were used in many successful decks of this period.

=== Reviews ===
- Rollespilsmagasinet Fønix (Danish) (Issue 6 - January/February 1995)

== Ice Age ==
Ice Age was the sixth Magic: The Gathering expansion set, released in June 1995. Ice Age was the beginning of the "block" paradigm for Magic, as the Alliances set released in 1996 continues the story of Ice Age.

== Chronicles ==
Chronicles
- Repeated symbols from Arabian Nights, Antiquities, Legends, and The Dark
- Released: July 1995
- Size: 116 cards/ 125 cards (counting diff. artwork)
- Expansion code: CHR
← Ice Age	Homelands →

Chronicles was the first compilation set of Magic: The Gathering, released in July 1995. The set is one of two sets that have been sold in twelve-card booster packs, the other having been Alliances. The set remains somewhat unusual, as Chronicles introduced no new cards, but solely reprinted cards from Arabian Nights, Antiquities, Legends, and The Dark. These reprints kept the original set's symbol as well, rather than using a Chronicles specific symbol. For tournament play, Chronicles was designated as an extension of the Fourth Edition base set. The cards in Chronicles are white-bordered, in accordance with the Wizards of the Coast policy of the time that black-bordered cards would only be reprinted with white borders. In addition, the game text on many Chronicles cards was updated to reflect then-current rules, rulings, and templating. For example, Cyclone from Arabian Nights instructed players to place "chips" on the card to mark its status, while the Chronicles reprint of Cyclone used "counters" instead, as had become standard usage.

Arabian Nights, Antiquities, Legends, and The Dark quickly sold out in the hobby-gaming market, so both new and existing players had extremely limited access to cards from those sets at the time. Chronicles was printed to satisfy the market demand of players who had been unable to buy as much of the first four expansions as they wished, or who were new players and missed those expansions entirely. Wizards of the Coast's development team for Chronicles excluded powerful, abusive cards that were the frequent sources of player complaints, such as Mana Drain, The Abyss, Nether Void, Moat, and Maze of Ith, while including cards that they determined had a high "coolness factor" and would drive sales with the predominantly casual player base for Magic at the time, such as the Elder Dragon Legends, The Wretched, Sol'Kanar the Swamp King, Dakkon Blackblade, and the three "Urza's Lands" from Antiquities. Tournament players added Chronicles reprints City of Brass, Erhnam Djinn, Recall, Divine Offering, Fountain of Youth, and Feldon's Cane to their decks at tournaments such as the first Pro Tour New York in February, 1996.

=== Printing and distribution ===
Chronicles was released in July 1995 and went out of print in December 1996. Chronicles sold in 12-card booster packs that contained three cards from the uncommon print sheet and nine from the common sheet. Of the cards from the uncommon sheet, 25 were three times as common as the other 46, essentially dividing the cards from the uncommon sheet into rares and uncommons. The commons come in four different rarities. The five multicolored Legends at common are C1, appearing each once on the print sheet and thus just as common as the uncommons from the set. The seven common artifacts are C2, and the 30 common cards with a single color are C3. The remaining three commons are the Urza's lands, originally from Antiquities. They are C4, but each has four different artworks, so for collector's purposes they often counted as three C1 cards each. It is estimated that about 180 million Chronicles cards were produced.

=== Renaissance ===
Wizards of the Coast released a similar set called Renaissance into German, French and Italian markets. The German and French versions of the black-bordered set are the same, and contained all the cards that rotated into 4th Edition from the first four expansion sets. This was due to company policy that stated that a card could not be reprinted in a white-bordered set without first appearing in a black-bordered set in that language. The Italian version of Renaissance (Rinascimento) had different cards, because Wizards of the Coast's licensee Stratelibri had already printed The Dark (Oscurità) and Legends (Leggende) in their entirety in Italian, and released them in that order, the opposite of the order of the original English versions. Rinascimento instead contained the cards rotated into 4th Edition from the Arabian Nights and Antiquities expansions, plus the cards reprinted in Chronicles from the Arabian Nights and Antiquities expansions.

Wizards of the Coast originally planned all foreign-language Chronicles sets to be black-bordered, except the Italian version, which would be white-bordered because every card in it had already been printed in Italian in a black-bordered set. However, Wizards of the Coast's licensee Hobby Japan ended up printing the only foreign-language Chronicles that was ever released—a Japanese printing with black borders.

=== Impact ===
Chronicles succeeded in opening up the supply of notable cards to casual players, eliminating scarcity issues on cards from the earlier sets. For Magic as a game, this was a great boon. However, it succeeded too well; collectors, speculators, and stores who'd invested in expensive cards saw the value of their purchases plummet. Due to complaints from them, Wizards of the Coast enacted the "Reserved List": a guarantee that a certain percentage of rares from each set would never be reprinted. It was essentially a guarantee that a set like Chronicles would not happen again. While initially largely ignored, the Reserved List has since grown contentious as the price of various old cards protected by the Reserved List has continued to climb in the years since, with "players constantly calling for its abolishment". Magic designer Mark Rosewater has said that he wishes the Reserved List had never been created, but Wizards of the Coast has elected to honor it because they didn't want to set a precedent that they broke their own promises. Wizards of the Coast stopped adding new cards to the Reserve List in Mercadian Masques, but it remains in force for some cards printed from 1993 to 1999. Once the Reserve List stopped being used for new sets, several other reprint sets have since been made that are similar to Chronicles such as Modern Masters and Eternal Masters.

=== Reviews ===
- Australian Realms #25

== Homelands ==
Homelands
- Globe of Ulgrotha
- Released: October 1995
- Size: 115 cards, 140 including different artwork
- Keywords: None new
- Mechanics: None new
- Designers: Scott Hungerford and Kyle Namvar
- Developers: Jim Lin, Chris Page, Dave Pettey, Skaff Elias
- Expansion code: HML (HL)
← Chronicles	Alliances →

Homelands was the seventh Magic: The Gathering expansion set, released in October 1995. While a stand-alone set as far as its storyline, it was considered to be part of the Ice Age block for tournament legality purposes until the announcement of Coldsnap in October 2005.

Homelands was the last set to be sold in eight-card booster packs; six cards would be from the common sheet, and two cards from the uncommon sheet. Uncommons and rares were distinguished by how often a card appeared on the uncommon sheet; (actual) uncommons were three times as frequent as rares.

=== Storyline ===
The set takes place in a plane known as Ulgrotha. Homelands begins 600 years earlier, during a war between the Tolgath, planeswalkers who desire knowledge, and the Ancients, wizards who are prepared to be cruel to defend 'their' mysteries. A Tolgath planeswalker named Ravi used an artifact called the Apocalypse Chime, given to her by her master, to destroy all life and mana on Ulgrotha. The plane became a prime battleground for wizards, until the planeswalker Feroz happened upon it. He wished to protect the plane, so he, along with the planeswalker Serra, created a ban to keep other planeswalkers out. Feroz later died in a lab accident while studying a fire elemental trapped in ice. Serra later allowed herself to be killed by a mugger who wanted to take her wedding ring (Serra would appear briefly in the novelization of a later set, Urza's Saga, but that appearance occurred prior to her coming to Ulgrotha).

The events surrounding the set begin many years after Feroz's death, when his ban begins to fade. The residents of Ulgrotha (now known to its inhabitants as the Homelands) are at war with one another.

=== Design ===
According to Aaron Forsythe, Magic Director of R&D, "it seems Homelands started design as a story first". While most Magic sets have a background story, it is rather unusual for a Magic set to have the story dictate most of the design of the cards in the set.

The 140-card set introduced no new mechanics or keywords; however, it did use some of the mechanics previously unique to Ice Age. Most notably, Homelands used the "cantrip" ability: a cantrip spell in the Ice Age block allowed a player to draw a card at the beginning of the next turn in addition to a normally minor spell effect. Later cantrips allowed a player to draw a card immediately.

Homelands also included single-color legendary creatures, first published in Ice Age. In Homelands, each color had at least one legend, with some colors having as many as five (Black has Baron Sengir, Irini Sengir, Grandmother Sengir, Veldrane of Sengir and Ihsan's Shade).

=== Reception ===
The expansion, on average, had an unexpectedly low power level compared to previously released expansions. Initially, very few cards were used for competitive play when the expansion was legal in the Standard tournament format. More problematically, the cards weren't considered interesting even ignoring their weak power level; Magic head designer Mark Rosewater labeled Homelands as "Magic's all-time design low". According to Rosewater, the set had been designed by friends of Wizards of the Coast CEO Peter Adkison, and Adkison ignored warnings from R&D that the set wasn't very good when publishing it. Additionally, the Magic balance team of the time de-powered much of the set, helping lead to the reputed low power level of the cards. When the first Pro Tour was held shortly after the release of the set, Wizards included a rule mandating that each deck had to have five cards from each legal expansion. This was widely perceived as forcing decks to include at least a few Homelands cards to be showcased in the top decks.

Andy Butcher reviewed Homelands for Arcane magazine, rating it an 8 out of 10 overall. Butcher comments that "players who want cheap 'killer cards' are going to be disappointed. Those who genuinely enjoy the game, though, will find Homelands a valuable addition to their card collection." In an analysis of the quality of every set, Craig Jones described Homelands as "the worst set in Magic's history."

=== Notable cards ===
- Autumn Willow – A green legend, its untargetability made it a staple in many early green decks. It was the first creature printed to be untargetable as a static ability.
- Baron Sengir – A black legend that was considered the first "lord" for vampires in Magic.
- Merchant Scroll – A blue sorcery that allows a player to search his or her library for a blue instant card and put it directly into his or her hand. This card has been restricted to one per deck in the Vintage format because it can search one of the many other extremely powerful blue cards in that format, such as Ancestral Recall and Force of Will.
- Serrated Arrows – An artifact that was considered one of the more powerful cards in the set, as it allowed any color to remove creatures from play. It was reprinted as part of the "timeshifted" subset in Time Spiral.
- Memory Lapse – A delaying counterspell that saw reasonably wide play and several reprints, although not in the modern era of Magic where the effect is considered slightly overcosted at 2 mana.

=== Reviews ===
- Rollespilsmagasinet Fønix (Danish) (Issue 11 - Dec/Jan 1995)
- Australian Realms #26
