= Fifth Edition =

Fifth Edition or 5th Edition may refer to:

- Dungeons & Dragons 5th edition
- Fifth Edition (Magic: The Gathering)
- Fifth edition of the IPL
