= Seventh Edition =

Seventh Edition may refer to:

- 7th Edition (Magic: The Gathering), playing cards
- Version 7 Unix, operating system
