= Power Nine =

Set of nine cards in Magic: The Gathering

In Magic: The Gathering, Power Nine is a set of nine cards that were printed in the game's early core sets, consisting of Black Lotus, Ancestral Recall, Time Walk, Mox Pearl, Mox Sapphire, Mox Jet, Mox Ruby, Mox Emerald, and Timetwister. These nine cards were printed in the first sets of Magic: The Gathering, starting in 1993. They are considered among the most powerful cards in the game. Owing to their power, they were banned from being played in most competitive settings.

The cards were added to Magic: The Gathering Arena in September 2022 with the introduction of the Alchemy: Dominaria United expansion set.

== Cards ==
Although the modern term for these cards is Power Nine, other terms existed in the early days of the game. A tournament in New York advertised a grand prize of either "The Big 10" cards or $1000; the cards in The Big 10 were the Power Nine cards and Chaos Orb.

During playtesting before the release of the Alpha edition, the Power Nine were deemed to be powerful cards whose scarcity would ensure the cards would not overpower games, but as print runs increased for each set the design team ultimately decided to remove the cards for the Revised Edition release.

=== Black Lotus ===
The "Black Lotus" card can be played at zero cost, and it grants three mana (the game's primary resource) when sacrificed (discarded from play). In Magic a player can have up to four cards of the same name in a deck. As such, playing this card gave a considerable advantage in the early stages of the game. It has since been banned from all official tournament formats except for Vintage, where it is limited to one copy per deck instead of four. An artist proof card has a white back and are likely more scarce than released versions.

Black Lotus is usually considered by collectors to be the most valuable non-promotional Magic card due to its limited print and limited distribution. There were 22,800 copies of the card printed overall, about 1,100 in the Alpha edition, and about 3,300 in the Beta edition. In 2013, one version of the card sold for $27,302. In 2021, one version of the card sold for $511,100. In 2022, Post Malone paid $800,000 for an artist's proof signed by artist Christopher Rush. Then records were broken in 2024 when an Alpha CGC graded at 10 sold for $3,000,000.

The card's standing in the Magic: the Gathering community is evinced by the creation of the Magic: The Gathering Players Tour, which was originally established as the Black Lotus Pro Tour and first contested in February 1996 in New York City.

The art for the card was created by Christopher Rush.

=== Moxes ===
The five original Mox cards are:

- Mox Emerald
- Mox Jet
- Mox Pearl
- Mox Ruby
- Mox Sapphire

They are colloquially known as "Moxen" or "Moxes", and each represents one of the Magic: The Gathering colors. These cards are similar to the five basic lands (the cards that provide the primary resource to play most cards) in that they cost nothing to play and can add one mana of a specific color to their owner's resource pool. Unlike lands, however, more than one can be played per turn. When tournaments were officially organized, a list of banned and restricted cards was created for the various formats; the Moxen were restricted to one copy each per deck.

In March 2022, a mint condition Alpha edition Mox Emerald sold for $29,999. An independent European Magic: The Gathering annual tournament is named Bazaar of Moxen.

The art for all cards was created by Dan Frazier.

=== Ancestral Recall ===
Ancestral Recall allows the player to either draw three cards or force the opponent to draw three cards, at an extremely low cost. Players normally draw one card on their turn. Ancestral Recall enables the player to accelerate their resource development, specifically the resource of cards-in-hand.

During the Gamma design phase of Magic: The Gathering, both Ancestral Recall and Time Walk were common cards; Richard Garfield stated that blue "was easily the most powerful magic, having two extremely insidious common spells", so each was made a rare card before publication. Ancestral Recall was deemed "vastly too powerful"; the functionally similar card Inspiration that was included in the core Sixth Edition allows a player to draw two cards instead of three, at a cost of one blue and three other mana, instead of one blue mana. The release of the Alliances expansion set included the card Library of Lat-Nam, intended as a substitute for Ancestral Recall with a higher in-game cost.

The art for the card was created by Mark Poole.

=== Time Walk ===
Time Walk allows the player to take an extra turn for two mana. In contrast, the equivalent effect of Nexus of Fate costs seven mana. One copy is permitted in the Vintage competitive format. During playtesting before release of the Alpha edition, a player told Richard Garfield during a game that Garfield would lose the game in the next turn; the "Time Walk" he had in his deck had the ambiguous text "opponent loses next turn", which was meant for the opposing player to skip his next turn, but interpreted to mean that the opponent would lose the game.

The card is banned in all play formats except Vintage.

The art for the card was created by Amy Weber.

=== Timetwister ===
Timetwister forces all players to shuffle their hand, library (draw pile) and graveyard (discard pile) together. Then, the players draw seven cards. Timetwister is itself put into a new graveyard afterward.

The card is banned in Legacy and other formats. It is restricted to one copy per deck in Vintage, and it is legal in Commander. The release of the Alliances expansion set included the card Diminishing Returns, intended as a substitute for Timetwister with a higher in-game cost. The art for the card was created by Mark Tedin.

== Collecting ==
The Power Nine represent the rarest and most expensive collectible Magic: The Gathering cards. As of 2022 Beckett Media has graded 263 copies of the Alpha edition of Black Lotus, and Professional Sports Authenticator (PSA) has graded 110. The low supply of genuine cards and the high demand result in high prices, and "every sale comes with the possibility of a new record". In addition, the cards will not be reprinted. Despite not being playable in most Magic: The Gathering formats, they are "highly sought-after collectors' items".

From January to August 2022, there were 122 Power Nine cards sold at auction, of which 21 were from Alpha, 30 were from Beta, and 71 were from Unlimited. A Black Lotus card signed by Richard Garfield with a grade of 6 from Beckett was sold for $72,000.

As of March 2023 there are six alpha Black Lotus cards graded as PSA 10. As of October 2014, there were 34 Beta Black Lotus cards rated PSA 10, and As of December 2020 four rated BGS 10 and 57 rated BGS 9.5.

== Legacy ==
The tournament system had by 1995 become dominated by decks using the Power Nine, all of which had increased in price on the secondary market to such an extent that they were unaffordable by most players. The organized play department within Wizards of the Coast began to worry that a "two-tier field of haves and have-nots was emerging", and that the latter may stop playing the game. The solution was to establish the Pro Tour using "cards everyone had access to" as a competitive system analogous to competitions in bridge, chess, and poker, or even sports such as basketball.

The expansion set Chronicles released in August 1995 reprinted numerous powerful cards from the first four expansion sets (Arabian Nights, Antiquities, Legends, and The Dark). This disappointed collectors, who believed the value of their collection would decrease, and many players, who had wanted even more cards from earlier sets reprinted instead of only the 166 in Chronicles. As a result of the complaints, Wizards of the Coast established the Reserved List in March 1996, a "significant and ill-thought-out concession" listing cards that would never be reprinted, among them the Power Nine. Players have generally opposed the Reserve List, while collectors and card sellers have supported it, as it tends to result in prices for cards on the list to increase over time. In a Tumblr post in September 2021, Mark Rosewater stated that the company's approach to the Reserve List was "not going to change".
