= Rath Cycle (Magic: The Gathering) =

Block of expansion sets in Magic: The Gathering

Tempest
- Tempest expansion symbol (Storm cloud)
- Released: October 1997; December 8, 2008 (MTGO)
- Size: 350 cards (110 commons, 110 uncommons, 110 rares, 20 basic lands)
- Keywords: Buyback, Shadow
- Mechanics: Slivers, Licids
- Designers: Mark Rosewater (lead), Richard Garfield, Charlie Catino, Mike Elliott
- Development code: Bogavhati
- Expansion code: TMP

First set in the Rath Cycle block
| Tempest | Stronghold | Exodus |
| ← Weatherlight | Stronghold → |
| ← Mirage Block | Urza Block → |

Stronghold
- portcullis
- Released: February 1998; April 13, 2009 (MTGO)
- Size: 143 cards (55 commons, 44 uncommons, 44 rares)
- Keywords: None new
- Mechanics: Spikes
- Development code: Rachimulot
- Expansion code: STH

Second set in the Rath Cycle block
| Tempest | Stronghold | Exodus |
| ← Tempest | Exodus → |
| ← Mirage Block | Urza Block → |

Exodus
- bridge
- Released: June 15, 1998; December 7, 2009 (MTGO)
- Size: 143 cards (55 commons, 44 uncommons, 44 rares)
- Keywords: None New
- Mechanics: None new
- Development code: Gorgonzola
- Expansion code: EXO

Third set in the Rath Cycle block
| Tempest | Stronghold | Exodus |
| ← Stronghold | Portal Second Age → |
| ← Mirage Block | Urza Block → |

Tempest Remastered
- Released: May 6, 2015 (MTGO only)
- Size: 269 cards (101 commons, 80 uncommons, 53 rares, 15 mythic rares)
- Expansion code: TPR
| ← Dragons of Tarkir | Modern Masters 2015 Edition → |

The Rath Cycle (also known as the Tempest block) is a cycle of three Magic: The Gathering expansions that continues the events of the Weatherlight Saga. Whereas there had previously been no official term for a trilogy (or tetralogy) of thematically or story-linked expansions, starter decks and booster packs from all three of these sets had the phrase "The Rath cycle" printed on them, firmly establishing "cycle" as the official word of choice and "The Rath Cycle" as the name of this particular cycle. It consists of Tempest (October 1997), Stronghold (March 1998) and Exodus (June 1998) as the 20th, 21st and 22nd expansion sets, respectively.

== Storyline ==
=== Tempest ===
The Weatherlight arrives in Rath to rescue Captain Sisay when Volrath's ship, the Predator, attacks. Volrath's forces, led by the dark angel Selenia, swarm the ship looking for Legacy artifacts – one of which is Karn. Captain Gerrard falls overboard into the forest of Skyshroud below. In an act of nonviolence, Karn gives himself up and is taken aboard the Predator. All the remaining artifacts are taken by Volrath except Squee's Toy. Tahngarth leaps onto the fleeing Predator and later finds Karn. Greven il-Vec intervenes against Tahngarth and takes him prisoner. Meanwhile, Gerrard flees the merfolk and finds himself in the company of the Vec on a pilgrimage. Their leader, The Oracle, believes Gerrard is a prophesied hero, the Korvecdal. The remaining crew of the Weatherlight descends into the Skyshroud forest for repairs, and Hanna and Mirri set out on foot to find Gerrard. The Skyshroud elves capture them and bring them before their elven lord Eladamri, who happened to receive the Vec and Gerrard into his company. Gerrard explains his mission and convinces Eladamri to free Hanna and Mirri. Gerrard then discusses the plans to reach Volrath's stronghold with Eladamri, Starke, and the Oracle en-Vec.

The Predator returns to Volrath's stronghold, where Volrath is displeased that Greven il-Vec failed to capture Gerrard, and uses his dark magic to torture him. Karn and Tahngarth are imprisoned in Volrath's torture chamber. On the Weatherlight, Eladamri provides the crew with directions to a portal that could help them escape Rath. Ertai leaves the ship to interpret the portal's runes, and to prepare it for use when the Weatherlight returns from the stronghold. Ertai is confronted by the Soltari emissary, Lyna, and is drawn into her world full of beings caught between Rath and Dominaria. In return, Ertai draws Lyna into his reality on Rath and they begin discussing the plight of the Soltari and Lyna's interest in the portal.

On the Weatherlight, Crovax feels Selenia en route to the stronghold. The crew travels to the Cinder Marsh and encounters a massive lair of sliver creatures that share a hive mind. With Hanna's help, they defeat the slivers and continue through the back door entrance to the stronghold via the ventilation ducts that lead to the Furnace of Rath. After fighting the fires of the Furnace, they travel to the Death Pits and are boarded by monsters called carrionettes. With the blessing of Orim, the Samite healer, Gerrard destroys them and escapes below deck, but not before saving Squee from carrionette reinforcements. Squee then activates his toy.

=== Stronghold ===
The Weatherlight's crew approaches Volrath's stronghold in search for Sisay and the missing pieces of the Legacy. Deep in the Dream Halls, Gerrard learns that Volrath is his former blood brother Vuel and the one who stole the Legacy. What appears to be a final conflict between Gerrard and Volrath ends with the death of an imposter shapeshifter.

=== Exodus ===
The Weatherlight's crew rescues the pieces of the Legacy and Sisay, and retreats through Volrath's Stronghold to go through the portal that would lead them off of Rath. They are assaulted by Volrath's forces, the elves of the Skyshroud forest, and the human tribes of the Kor, Vec, and Dal, recently reunited by Gerrard of Weatherlight.

== Set history ==
=== Tempest ===
Tempest was the second set and the first standalone to follow the crew of the flying ship Weatherlight; though most of the members were killed off in the later Invasion Cycle, a few of them (particularly Karn) have intermittently appeared in expansions ever since. The release of Tempest represented a large jump in the power level of the card set, compared to the previous Mirage cycle. Many cards from Tempest instantly became (and still are) tournament staples. Its expansion symbol is a cloud with a lightning bolt erupting out. On December 8, 2008, Tempest was released for Magic: The Gathering Online.

Tempest was originally intended to have a major "poison" theme, but in the end all poison cards were pulled from the set.

=== Stronghold ===
Stronghold was the last set in which multicolored cards appeared until the 2000 expansion Invasion.

On April 13, 2009, Stronghold was released on Magic: The Gathering Online. It went off sale on April 27, 2009, but was briefly available again for the release of Exodus on December 7, 2009.

=== Exodus ===
Exodus was the first set to make a card's rarity visibly apparent on the card itself. All previous expansions had no way to tell whether a card was a common card or a rare card. From Exodus on, the expansion symbol reveals what rarity a card is: if a card has a black expansion symbol, it is a common card (eleven in a fifteen-card booster pack); if it has a silver expansion symbol, it is an uncommon card (three in a booster pack); if it has a gold expansion symbol, it is a rare card (one in a booster pack).

Exodus was also the first set to add collectors' numbers to the cards themselves. Next to the copyright information are two numbers in the format X/Y, where X is the card's collectors' number and Y the number of cards in the set in question. The cards were numbered in alphabetical order by color according to the Magic color wheel, starting with white and going clockwise. Exodus was also the first set to center the artist and copyright information at the bottom of the card instead of having that information aligned to the left side of the card. This change persisted until the card design change in 8th Edition.

=== Tempest Remastered ===
Tempest Remastered was a Magic Online-exclusive set released on May 6, 2015. The set featured 269 cards (including basic lands) specially selected from the three expansions of the Rath Cycle. Although cards retain their original illustrations, all cards used the most recent card layout, and may have a different rarity than those from the original sets.

== Mechanics ==
Tempest introduced two new keyworded mechanics to Magic: Buyback and Shadow. Buyback appears on instants and sorceries, and spells with buyback have an optional buyback cost which, if paid, returns the spell to the owner's hand after being cast instead of being placed in the graveyard. Shadow is an ability on white, black and blue creatures that restricted those creatures to blocking or being blocked by other creatures with the shadow trait.

The Rath Cycle introduced several new creature types, notably Slivers, Spikes, and Licids. Slivers share their abilities with other Slivers in play, continue into Stronghold, and are absent from Exodus. They later made appearances in Legions, Scourge, Time Spiral, Planar Chaos, Future Sight, Magic 2014, and Magic 2015. Licids have the ability to become creature enchantments, in lore combining symbiotically with another creature and granting that creature their abilities; they can also be turned back into creatures again for a cost. Tempest and Stronghold each received five uncommon licids, one for each color, while Exodus received only one uncommon colorless licid and one rare blue licid. They have never been seen since then. Spikes are 0/0 creatures that come into play with a number of +1/+1 counters, and could move these counters off of themselves and onto other creatures, or remove them for effects. Only one Spike was printed in Tempest; the rest were split evenly between Stronghold and Exodus. Like Slivers, Spikes returned in Time Spiral. The en-Kor were not a creature type, but were united by their ability to freely redistribute damage from themselves to other creatures. A deck full of en-Kor and creatures with protection from black and protection from red placed in the top 8 at the 1998 World Championships.

Painlands and Depletion lands, first introduced in Ice Age, both return in Tempest. Tempest painlands were nerfed when compared to their Ice Age counterparts by coming into play tapped. The new Depletion lands, by contrast, were improved over their Ice Age counterparts by being able to be tapped for colorless mana without the depletion effect. The depletion effect itself is reworded to no longer use depletion counters.

== Design notes ==
As was done in Ice Age and Mirage, Tempest continued to import staple cards from earlier sets into the current environment. In addition, a couple of newer staples from Mirage and Visions were reprinted. Tempest also printed a number of cards that combined abilities of older cards with the "buyback" keyword. Tempest also attempted to fix a number of classic but overpowered cards.

Exodus does not introduce new keywords or mechanics, but it did use the Buyback and Shadow mechanics introduced in Tempest. There are two cycles in Exodus that benefit a player when they are behind their opponent(s). The first cycle are the Oaths, one rare enchantment of each color, that would check a resource of each player and then balance them out. The second is the Keepers, that were weaker creature versions of the oaths, and uncommon.
