= Miniatures Handbook =

Tabletop role-playing game supplement

- Cover of Miniatures Handbook
- Author: Jonathan Tweet, Mike Donais, Skaff Elias, and Rob Heinsoo
- Genre: Role-playing game
- Publisher: Wizards of the Coast
- Publication date: October 2003
- Media type: Print (Hardback)
- Pages: 192
- ISBN: 0-7869-3281-3
- OCLC: 53277725
- LC Class: GV1469.62.D84 D836 2000

The Miniatures Handbook is an official supplement for the 3.5 edition of the Dungeons & Dragons roleplaying game.

== Contents ==
The Miniatures Handbook is a Dungeons & Dragons supplement containing rules variants for the Dungeons & Dragons Miniatures Game, including dungeon crawls and mass combat, and new 3rd edition prestige classes.

=== Chapters ===
1. Characters Provides information on the Favored Soul, Healer, Marshal, and Warmage classes. Also provides details on the Bonded Summoner, Dragon Samurai, Havoc Mage, Skullclan Hunter, Tactical Soldier, War Hulk, and Warchief prestige classes. It also provide numerous feats.
2. Magic: Provides information on new spells, ranging from 0th level to 5th level, as well as several new magic items.
3. Monsters: Provides information on new monsters, including the Kruthik, Mad Slasher, Protectar, and Stonechild.
4. Stat Cards: Provides information on reading and understanding statistics cards, with respect both to roleplaying and skirmish.
5. Skirmish Rules: Provides information on the skirmish game, Including Command, Movement, Spells, and Terrain. Also provides rules on skirmish campaigns.
6. Mass Battle Rules: Presents rules for large scale action in which creatures fight together in large, regimented groups.
7. Random Dungeons: Shows how to turn miniatures' stat cards into a "dungeon deck" to generate random encounters.

== Publication history ==
Miniatures Handbook was authored by Jonathan Tweet, Mike Donais, Skaff Elias, and Rob Heinsoo, and published by Wizards of the Coast in October 2003. Cover art was by Stephen Tappin, and interior art was by Trevor Hairsine, Des Hanley, Adrian Smith, Stephen Tappin, and Richard Wright.

Jonathan Tweet explained the initial goal behind the book: "The Miniatures Handbook and the D&D Miniatures line in general developed because we saw that miniatures were a big part of the D&D roleplaying experience. We wanted to support players who use miniatures in their games, as well as create easy-to-use miniatures for players who would like to use miniatures but don't. In addition, we built on the experience Wizards has with competitive games. Our D&D miniatures are designed to work in a roleplaying game, but we've also created a head-to-head skirmish system for fighting fast, tactical battles with them. The Miniatures Handbook, like the miniatures themselves, supports both roleplaying and head-to-head wargaming."

== Reception ==
Shannon Appelcline noted that the book got "somewhat mixed reviews" and that parts of the book "like the mass battle rules - which may have dated back, in part, all the way to Wizard's unpublished 'Military Order' book - were derided as not working well with the random nature of the miniatures. Still, the book probably served its purpose of cross-marketing Dungeons & Dragons and the Miniatures game."

== Reviews ==
- Backstab #47
- Coleção Dragão Brasil
