= Invasion (Magic: The Gathering) =

Block of expansion sets in Magic: The Gathering

- Released: September 2000
- Size: 350 cards (110 commons, 110 uncommons, 110 rares, 20 basic lands)
- Keywords: Kicker
- Mechanics: Multicolored Cards, Split cards
- Development code: Beijing
- Expansion code: INV

First set in the Invasion block
Invasion	Planeshift	Apocalypse
← Prophecy	Beatdown →
← Masques Block	Odyssey Block →

Planeshift
- Released: February 2001
- Size: 143 cards (55 commons, 44 uncommons, 44 rares)
- Keywords: Kicker
- Mechanics: Multicolored Cards, Domain, Gating
- Development code: Hong Kong
- Expansion code: PLS

Second set in the Invasion block
Invasion	Planeshift	Apocalypse
← Beatdown	7th Edition →
← Masques Block	Odyssey Block →

Apocalypse
- Released: June 2001
- Size: 143 cards (55 commons, 44 uncommons, 44 rares)
- Keywords: N/A
- Mechanics: Multicolored cards
- Development code: Shanghai
- Expansion code: APC

Third set in the Invasion block
Invasion	Planeshift	Apocalypse
← 7th Edition	Odyssey →
← Masques Block	Odyssey Block →

Invasion is a Magic: The Gathering block that consists of the expert-level expansion sets Invasion (September 2000), Planeshift (February 2001) and Apocalypse (June 2001). The Invasion block centered on multicolored cards.

== Storyline ==
=== Invasion ===
In the Invasion storyline, the Planeswalker Urza helps Gerrard Capashen and the crew of the flying ship Weatherlight to repel the Phyrexians, led by Yawgmoth, as they attempt to overrun the lands of Dominaria.

=== Apocalypse ===
Following Gerrard and the Weatherlight's victory at Koilos and the death of Hanna, Yawgmoth unleashes the Apocalypse on Dominaria by coming to the world himself and raising the dead from the earth. As this was after a war that lasted a few years, there were many, many dead.

== Set history ==
Invasion saw the return of multi-colored "gold" cards, absent since the Stronghold expansion. Its major themes revolved around multicolor decks and strategies. The popularity and appeal of "gold" cards along with high but balanced power level culminated into making Invasion one of the most popular Magic sets in the game's history. The set was designed by Bill Rose, Mike Elliot and Mark Rosewater. The multi-color nature of the set had been decided by late in 1998, with the design relying heavily on an early draft set design by original playtester Barry Reich. Invasion was the first set to be released digitally on Magic Online.

The block's major themes revolved around multi-colored "gold" cards, decks and strategies. Invasion was primarily focused on allied color pairs, while Planeshift focused on allied 3-color "shards" and Apocalypse focused heavily on enemy 2-color pairs, a first for the game.

== Mechanics ==
The sets in the Invasion block focus on multicolored cards. Invasion and Planeshift focus on allied-colored cards, while Apocalypse focus on enemy-colored cards.

Invasion introduced several new mechanics. One of these was kicker, an optional cost in addition to the card's casting cost. Paying this additional cost would activate an additional ability or effect on the card. Invasion had a number of cards that have an effect based on the number of basic land types the casting player controlled, which was given the name "Domain" in Conflux. Invasion was also the first set with split cards: literally two cards printed on one, Split cards had two different effects for different costs. As they were played, their controller chose which half to use. They were almost killed in development as almost all of Wizard's R&D disliked them.

Planeshift introduced the gating mechanic. Creatures with gating cost less to play, but their controller must return a creature he or she controls to its owner's hand. It also had a cycle of "familiar" creatures that reduced the cost of allied-colored spells.

Apocalypse reprised many cycles found in Invasion, including enemy-colored "Bears" and "split cards." Apocalypse's single most important cycle of cards was the enemy-colored "painlands," which promoted the set's theme, power level, and popularity.

== Notable cards ==
Notable cards in Apocalypse include Fire // Ice, Goblin Ringleader, Pernicious Deed, Spiritmonger and Vindicate.
