= Skaff Elias =

American game designer

- Born: George Skaff Elias c. 1970
- Education: University of Pennsylvania, Princeton University
- Alma mater: Southern Lehigh High School
- Occupation: Game designer
- Years active: 1993–present

George Skaff Elias (born c. 1970) is an American game designer. He has worked on many of the sets of Magic: the Gathering, and contributed to its development for a decade.

== Career ==
Elias started working on Magic: The Gathering at Wizards of the Coast when the company was still fairly new. He was one of the designers for various Magic sets, including Arabian Nights (December 1993), Antiquities (March 1994), Legends (June 1994), Fallen Empires (November 1994), and Ice Age (June 1995), Mark Rosewater also credits Skaff Elias with the invention of the Magic Pro Tour.

Elias was responsible for the design work on the Chainmail miniatures game. Elias and Richard Garfield designed an MMORPG based on Dungeons & Dragons, which was never published because Hasbro sold the D&D computer game rights to Infogrames.

He co-authored the D&D manual Miniatures Handbook (2003).

Elias and Garfield also worked on Mind Twist, a free-to-play strategy game from Mind Control Software.

In 2022, Nerdlab Games published Mindbug, a dueling card game designed by Elias, Garfield, Christian Kudahl, and Marvin Hegen.

In late 2024, Elias joined GameQbator Labs as part of the leadership and design team for the 2025 relaunch of the trading card game MetaZoo. Working alongside Magic creator Richard Garfield and former Pokémon executives, Elias helped oversee the transition and complete mechanical overhaul of the game following the original publisher's bankruptcy.

== Personal life ==
Elias went to Southern Lehigh High School and was the captain of its Scholastic Scrimmage team. He attended Princeton University for an undergraduate degree in physics and completed a graduate degree in math at the University of Pennsylvania

Growing up, he was a fan of Jules Verne.
