= Magic: The Gathering core sets, 1993–2007 =

The collectible card game Magic: The Gathering published nine base sets from 1993–2007, also referred to as core sets. The base sets were considered descendants of the original Limited Edition, and shaped the default setting and feel of Magic. These sets consisted entirely of reprinted cards. These cards were generally simpler than cards in expansion sets, omitting multicolored cards, and used only the original abilities and keywords of Magic such as Flying and Trample. This simplicity led to many cards from these sets being considered "staples" of deck design. All cards were given a white border to mark them as reprints, with a few exceptions (Tenth Edition, foil cards in Seventh-Ninth Editions). From Fourth Edition in 1995 onward, a new base set would come out once per two years in the spring or early summer; for tournament play, that set would be legal for two years in the Standard format until the next core set replaced it.

Early in the history of Magic, the sets sold out nearly instantaneously, and supplying the game's growing fan base proved tricky. Sales were also concentrated on the West Coast of the United States, where Wizards of the Coast was based. The earliest base sets—Unlimited, Revised, and Fourth Edition—helped provide the first experience with Magic for many players in areas where Magic had never been sold before, enabling them to catch up on the base game with cards that, while technically reprints, had never been available to them before. As the market became saturated, the base sets took on a changed role; they began to be marketed as the entry point for new Magic players, with less interest expected from dedicated Magic players who likely owned many of the cards already. Seventh Edition, released in 2001, was sold both as a "Basic" and an "Advanced" product, with the expansion sets of the time marked as "Expert". Eighth and Ninth editions were marketed similarly. However, sales were disappointing, an alarming problem for Wizards, as some entry point for newer players was required to keep Magic alive. In 2009, Wizards of the Coast changed their policy for base sets, and began making smaller base sets that included new cards, starting with the Magic 2010 set. According to Wizards of the Coast, the previous base sets had "been completely marginalized by the enfranchised player base", and change was required to make the base sets of interest to players of all skill levels once more.

== Unlimited ==
Unlimited Edition
- Released: December 1, 1993
- Size: 302 cards (75 common, 95 uncommon, 117 rare, 15 basic land)
- Print run: 40,000,000
- Keywords: Banding, First Strike, Flying, Landwalk, Trample
- Expansion code: 2ED (UL)
← Limited Edition	Arabian Nights →

Unlimited Edition, occasionally referred to as Second Edition, was the second Magic: The Gathering set and the second base set. It was released on December 1, 1993; this time the run was 40 million cards. Unlimited Edition contains exactly the same cards as Limited Edition, including the Power Nine cards. Unlimited cards have white borders rather than black, however. This precedent that white borders implied a reprint was honored until the 2007 release of Tenth Edition, which returned to black borders.

Unlimited was sold in starter packs of 60 cards and booster packs of 15 cards. It was the first set to be officially titled as something other than just Magic: The Gathering. The "Unlimited Edition" label appears on the booster boxes, decks, and booster packs. While it is possible to distinguish Unlimited cards from Revised cards by just looking at the text (wording and type set) the cards from both sets are more easily distinguished by comparing the borders of the cards. The picture frame of Unlimited cards has a beveled edge which Revised cards have not.

== Revised Edition ==
Revised Edition
- Released: April 1994
- Size: 306 cards (75 commons, 95 uncommons, 121 rares, 15 basic lands)
- Print run: over 100,000,000
- Expansion code: 3ED (RV)
← Antiquities	Legends →

Revised Edition (also simply known as Revised) was the sixth set and third core set released for Magic: The Gathering. Like previous core sets, it had no expansion symbol. Revised Edition cards are white-bordered and generally known for their washed-out look. The set was released in April 1994 and contained 306 cards. It was the first base set to contain cards from black-bordered sets other than Alpha and Beta.

An advertisement in the first issue of The Duelist stated that the set would have gray borders and be released with a "constantly changing card mix", the first of which would be 30 cards from Arabian Nights.

=== Printing and distribution ===
Printing of Revised began in early April 1994 and continued until April 1995, when Fourth Edition was announced. It is estimated that about 500 million cards of the set were produced, which fully eliminated the distribution problems of earlier sets. The cards of Revised were still widely available even well into 1996.

The cards of Revised like the cards of the preceding Unlimited Edition all had white borders, no expansion symbol, and the artist credit at the bottom left. However, the cards were far paler than their Unlimited counterparts, and the three-dimensional beveling of the cards was cropped out. The omission of the bevel in the card frame was an error. This gave the cards an appearance that was widely criticized as "washed out" and even unprofessional. The beveling was returned in 4th Edition, and the colors were much more vibrant in that set. The large print run meant that Revised basic lands were so numerous and common that it was uncommon to find any other lands in decks until several years later.

The collation of the cards made it possible for a basic land card to appear in the common and uncommon slots of a pack. This was intentional; the land cards were printed on the common and uncommon print sheets. Basic lands would get their own full print sheets in 4th Edition, making Revised the last tournament-legal set until Seventh Edition in which basic lands could be found in booster packs. Basic lands returned as a card slot in the Shards of Alara block of 2008.

Revised was the first base edition of the game to be sold in multiple languages. Black bordered, limited editions were produced in French, German, and Italian. Unlimited, white bordered editions in the same languages were produced after the limited editions had sold out.

==== Misprints ====
One card-printing error of note appeared on the card Serendib Efreet. This blue creature card was misprinted with a green border and a picture of another card, Ifh-Bíff Efreet. The name, mana cost and rules text were all correct, though. The Revised version is now the most common due to the limited print run of the original, intended versions.

The card Disintegrate was missing the clause "and cannot be regenerated".

The card Onulet incorrectly listed the artist as Kerstin Kaman instead of Anson Maddocks.

=== Rule changes ===
The printing of Revised cleared up a number of problems with the Limited Edition and Unlimited Edition rules. Two changes had a large effect on game play. First, the rule that "multiple effects resolve simultaneously unless a conflict arises" was changed to "effects always resolve last-in-first-out". The concept was later refined and then referred to as the "stack", an idea taken from computer programing's stack. Second, the rule for Protection from was changed from "the creature is unaffected by X" to the more precise "the creature cannot be blocked by X creatures, be the target of X spells or abilities, or be enchanted by X enchantments; and all damage dealt to this creature by X sources is reduced to zero".

The most visually obvious of Revised's changes was the elimination of the Mono/Poly/Continuous qualifiers to artifacts. With the advent of the game's first tap symbol (a "T" turned forty-five degrees clockwise in a light gray circle), the qualifiers used to differentiate when and how often an artifact could be used were no longer needed. Artifacts that were previously classified as Mono artifacts were given the new tap symbol, while Poly and Continuous artifacts were simply re-templated without the tap symbol.

=== Summer Magic ===
The Summer Magic print run of Revised Edition were printed in the summer of 1994. This print run intended to fix some of the errors with Revised, including the washed-out color, but had problems of its own. The colors were considered too dark and the artist credited for Plateau stayed uncorrected as well as the artist credited for Serendib Efreet, although the Efreet had received its original color and art again. A new misprint occurred with the green card Hurricane; the so-called "blue Hurricane" is one of the rarest and most sought-after cards in the entirety of Magic because of its misprint with a blue border. On the secondary market it sells for thousands of dollars. The print run was recalled and destroyed; however, about 40 booster boxes that were shipped to England and Tennessee survived. No more than 11 or 12 of each rare exists.

This print run is known primarily for its extremely scarce and valuable cards and packs. Cards are distinguished by dark coloring and a 1994 copyright date displayed at the bottom, along with the artist credit. Booster packs look identical to normal Revised Edition packs, and as such, telling them apart is impossible without opening them. No starter decks were made.

=== Notable cards and card changes ===
Twenty Revised cards were originally in the Arabian Nights expansion, and another nineteen were originally in the Antiquities expansion. Thirty-five cards that were in Unlimited were not in Revised, including the Power Nine. A few of the cards that were removed from the base set reappeared in later sets, such as Icy Manipulator, which would be reprinted in Ice Age. A few others would be reprinted in Eighth Edition to celebrate the game's 10th anniversary. Cards removed were generally thought to either be confusing, or to have power level issues.

Notable cards include:

- The Dual Lands: Tundra, Underground Sea, Badlands, Taiga, Savannah, Scrubland, Bayou, Tropical Island, Volcanic Island and Plateau. These lands provide two colors of mana with the benefit of possessing two basic land types, an uncommon trait on non-basic lands. All future dual lands would be printed with restrictions. They are now a defining part of the Legacy and Vintage formats, due in particular to their ability to be searched for by the various Fetchlands released many years later. While many cards were removed from Revised for power reasons, the original dual lands were retained.
- Demonic Tutor – The original and most powerful "tutor" card ever printed. This card is restricted in Vintage and banned in Legacy. All future tutors were printed with restrictions or made more expensive like Odyssey's Diabolic Tutor.
- Serendib Efreet - This blue card was printed with the wrong art and a green card frame, making it the most commonly seen misprint.
- Sol Ring – While all of the zero-casting cost mana artifacts were removed from Revised, Sol Ring remained with its single casting cost. Its mana acceleration has caused it to be restricted in Vintage and banned in Legacy.
- Channel - By far the most broken card in the set, Channel was famous for enabling first-turn kills when combined with spells that had "x" in the casting cost, such as Fireball and Disintegrate. It was reprinted in Fourth Edition.
- Atog and Shatterstorm - notable for being the only Revised Edition cards to be removed from Fourth Edition but "make a triumphant return in Fifth Edition", in the words of Beth Moursund in the MTG Encyclopedia volume 2.

== Fourth Edition ==
Fourth Edition
- Released: April 1995
- Size: 378 cards (121 commons, 121 uncommons, 121 rares, 15 basic lands)
- Expansion code: 4ED
← Fallen Empires	Ice Age →

The Fourth Edition of Magic: The Gathering was the tenth set released for the game, and the fourth base set. The set was released in April 1995 and contained 378 cards. It was the first set to reprint cards from the expansions Legends and The Dark. Fourth Edition cards have white borders. The set has no expansion symbol.

Fourth Edition was the first Magic set to be printed in Asian languages. It was published in English, French, German, Italian, and as a first for a Magic set in Japanese, traditional Chinese, Korean, Spanish, and Portuguese, which was printed primarily for the Brazilian market. Korean and Chinese Fourth Edition cards have been made with black borders, Japanese, Portuguese, and Spanish cards exist with white and black borders.

=== Physical attributes ===
Fourth Edition included the beveled border missing from the previous core set, Revised. The colors were also much more saturated than in Revised. This set was also the first core set to include a Wizards of the Coast copyright notice at the bottom of the card, in addition to the standard illustration credit.

Booster packs, for the first time in a core set, came in packs with cropped card art on the packaging. Up to this point, Alpha, Beta, Unlimited, and Revised all had a common-looking booster pack packaging. The cards Brass Man, Hurloon Minotaur, Mana Vault, Mesa Pegasus, and Spirit Link were shown on the booster packs. Starter packs were also improved, with mana symbols replacing the simple colored dots present on the card back. Finally, an overall red-brown theme was given to the packaging, which would persist for Fifth Edition before changing to green in 6th Edition.

Starter decks in this set included an additional rare, bringing the total to three. However, the starter decks contained fewer uncommons, going down to nine from the previous thirteen. Booster Packs included one rare, three uncommons, and eleven commons. Fourth Edition was the first set to offload its land printings to a dedicated land sheet. This freed up room on the other card sheets to include more spells. As a result, booster packs could now be produced without any lands, which Wizards decided to do. Fourth Edition lands were only available in starter decks. The change was mostly seen as a positive, since by this time lands were ubiquitous and players were unhappy to find a land in place of a "real" card.

Fourth Edition introduced the modern turned arrow tapped symbol, replacing the rotated "T" that had been introduced in Revised, as a universal tap symbol to include on cards in all language editions of the game. This symbol was first used in an expansion with Ice Age, which was released in the summer. Current cards still use the turned arrow, albeit with a slightly different illustration.

=== Cards removed ===
Like the previous core set and all core sets since, several cards were removed and new ones were added from Fourth Edition. Among those cards removed were those that had attracted controversy from those outside the game. Most of the cards whose art depicted nude or near-nude humanoid forms (including Earthbind and Guardian Angel) were excised, as were many that had overtly religious themes (including Resurrection and Demonic Hordes), though one demon, Lord of the Pit, remained. One card, Unholy Strength had its artwork altered to remove a flaming inverted pentagram in the background (as compared to this). Also removed were the original ten "dual lands" (one for each pair of Magic's five colors). With the ability to tap for one mana of either of two colors, they were deemed too powerful. A number of other cards would also be pruned from the set for being too powerful, but some (such as Clone) would appear in future sets.

=== Alternate Fourth Edition ===
Wizards has used Cartamundi as their card printer since Alpha. For some undocumented reason, during the production of 4th Edition, the company experimented with using other vendors. Some cards were printed by the United States Playing Card Corporation, and had a thicker stock along with a glossy overcoat on the back. While these cards were not intended to be released, some starter packs were leaked out into public circulation. The cards do not glow under blacklight, unlike normal cards, and did not have the normal dot design on the back.

=== Notable cards ===
- Balance – This card can act as a Wrath of God, Armageddon, and Mind Twist all at once if played at the right time. It was one of the few extremely powerful cards left in the 4th Edition. Even after its restriction, it was still able to warp tournament formats.
- Strip Mine – While most of the cards deemed too powerful were removed from 4th Edition, this one was actually added in. Strip Mine was originally from Antiquities but had not been included in Revised. Tournament play quickly showed that Strip Mine was too powerful and it was eventually restricted to one per deck in Standard and Vintage. Today it is banned in Legacy. Over time, Wizards of the Coast has come to downplay land destruction as an element of the game and Strip Mine has not been reprinted since in a regular set in part due to this policy.

== Fifth Edition ==
Fifth Edition
- (Symbol used in Simplified Chinese printing of Fifth Edition only)
- Released: March 1997
- Size: 449 cards (166 commons, 130 uncommons, 133 rares, 20 basic lands)
- Developers: Mark Rosewater, Skaff Elias, Robert Gutschera
- Expansion code: 5ED
← Visions	Portal →

Fifth Edition was the seventeenth Magic: The Gathering set, released in March 1997. It contained 449 cards, counting multiple illustrations of the basic lands, making it the largest card set in the game's history. It was the first edition of the core set to reprint cards from Fallen Empires, Ice Age, and Homelands.

Like its predecessors, Revised and Fourth Editions, Fifth Edition made numerous changes to the game's rules and card mix. The set's designers stated in The Duelist that they wanted to prune from the base set cards that were too powerful or too weak. Many overpowered cards from Limited and Unlimited Editions that had survived the past two rotations were removed from Fifth, but a handful, including Dark Ritual, still survived. Unlike its predecessors, though, Fifth Edition also removed many cards that Magic's Design and Development team saw as just a little bit too good, but not quite so powerful as to heavily disrupt tournaments, including Lightning Bolt, Swords to Plowshares, and Serra Angel. Many of these cards were brought back in later sets after the designers had re-evaluated their impact on play. A few cards that were in Revised but had been cut from Fourth were brought back as well.

Fifth Edition also set a new precedent by changing the artwork and/or flavor text on many cards, especially the five basic lands, each of which was given four new illustrations to replace its original three. This was done so that WotC would not have to continue to pay for the use of many arts done for earlier sets, as originally artists were paid royalties for their artwork being used, instead of a flat fee as is done today for new Magic art.

Fifth Edition was the first version of the base set to reprint cards from the Fallen Empires and Homelands expansion sets; it also reprinted more cards from those sets than any other version of the base set has. Because those expansion sets were perceived by some players as weak, there was some dissatisfaction with the Fifth Edition card mix. However, many of the reprinted cards were good enough to be used in tournaments, and at least one Ice Age card, Necropotence, was later considered so overpowered as to merit banning from a number of sanctioned tournament formats.

Fifth Edition was the first version of the base set to use the cosmetic changes that were introduced in the Mirage expansion (including a slightly expanded text box and bolder, more visible power/toughness numbers) It was also the last version of the base set to use what are sometimes referred to as the "old rules". The rules were drastically changed in Sixth Edition.

== Sixth Edition ==
6th Edition (Classic)
- Roman numeral 6
- Released: April 27, 1999
- Size: 350 cards (110 commons, 110 uncommons, 110 rares, 20 basic lands)
- Expansion code: 6ED
← Urza's Legacy	Urza's Destiny →

Sixth Edition, also known as Classic, was released on April 27, 1999. It contains 350 cards including both reprints of cards from previous core sets as well as new reprints from expansion sets through the Weatherlight expansion. The name "Classic" was prominently featured on cases of packs of the set, and the set was referred to by both titles by both Wizards of the Coast and players.

Sixth Edition was the first base set to have its artist information centered on the card (a printing practice started in Exodus). It was also the first base set to have collectors' numbers (which also originated in Exodus). The rules text on basic lands was also replaced with just a mana symbol, as featured in the Portal starter sets of 1997 and 1998.

Perhaps the biggest cosmetic change to the base set, however, was the expansion symbol. Sixth Edition was the first core set to have an expansion symbol, which was necessary to show the cards' rarities (another practice that originated in Exodus). The set's expansion symbol was the Roman numeral VI, or 6. (This change had occurred slightly earlier in the Traditional Chinese version of Fifth Edition, which used a Roman Numeral 'V' as the expansion set. The Traditional Chinese version came out notably later than the English version, by which time Wizards of the Coast had decided the feature was necessary.)

=== Rule changes ===
The release of Sixth Edition brought a new version of the rules. Notable changes included:

- The "batch" system of spell resolution was replaced with the "stack" system in Sixth Edition. Previously, spells resolved in complicated batches, in which a player could only respond to the spells in the batch. Also, once a batch began to resolve, no more spells could be played until the entire batch of spells resolved. This was replaced with the stack system (much like a computer stack), in which spells could be added regardless of what was on it. Also, spells resolve one at a time in the stack, utilizing the "last in first out" system.
- The new stack system removed the "timing" aspect of spells. Therefore, the interrupt spell type was removed as being redundant. All spells that were interrupts (generally counterspells) became instants.
- Before Sixth Edition, spells and abilities that produced mana were known as mana sources and couldn't be countered. In Sixth Edition, mana source spells (such as Dark Ritual) became instants, which could be countered just like other instants. (Mana source abilities, on the other hand, became "mana abilities"; these didn't use the stack and still could not be countered.)
- Triggered abilities were clarified. Under the old system, these confused many players who didn't know how (or when) to respond to them. With the "timing" aspect removed in Sixth Edition, it became clearer just when a player could play a spell to combat a triggered ability.
- The "damage-prevention step" was removed. Now, when a spell deals damage, it deals it immediately on resolution, rather than waiting for damage prevention. The difference lies in when a player can play damage prevention: Previously, a player would play it after the damage spell resolves. After the rule change, the player had to play it before the damage spell resolves.
- Artifacts also received a rule change. Before the change, an artifact "shut off" or stopped working while it was tapped, unless it was an artifact creature. After, an artifact remains active while tapped. This was to bring artifacts more in line with other cards. Some artifacts (like Howling Mine and Static Orb) retained the "shut off" aspect, which necessitated explicitly printing that they only worked while untapped.
- Combat was restructured. Each step of combat was clearly demarcated, and each step had opportunities for players to play spells.
- Combat damage from creatures was also put on the stack where spells and abilities would normally go. In this way, combat damage could be responded to before the damage is actually dealt. This allowed (among other things) creatures in combat to be sacrificed for effects and still deal damage as though they were still in play. This change would later be reversed in the rule changes introduced with the Magic 2010 core set.
- One of the loss conditions was changed. Before the change, a player that lost all of their life didn't lose the game immediately; if they were able to raise their life to at least 1 before the end of the current phase, they lived. Under 6th Edition rules, a player loses the game as soon as a player has priority once their life total is zero or less. This brought that loss condition in line with the other loss condition specified by the rules; a player being forced to draw a card when he or she has an empty library has always been an immediate loss.
- Originally, spells that summoned creatures were called summon spells; they were not used to represent creatures unless the creature in question had been successfully summoned and was in play. However, a few cards like Raise Dead had been incorrectly referring to summon spells as "creatures" or "creature spells" for a long time regardless of their location. Rather than correct the wording on these cards, WotC decided to abolish summon spells entirely and replace them with the functionally equivalent "creature spell"
- Originally, if two cards had the same ability, that ability would be expressed the same way on both cards. Starting in 6E, lands would no longer have their abilities written out. Instead, a giant mana symbol appeared in the text box. However, cards that had the exact same ability as a basic land, such as Llanowar Elves, would still have the ability written out.
- Banding was discontinued

Some of these changes were well-received, but the combination of all of the changes proved to be extremely controversial and divisive, and was compared to the Portal set and rules. The state of the game prior to these changes was often referred to as "real Magic" by people who hated the changes, a fact that Wizards of the coast eventually acknowledged on the "Old Fogey" card from the Unhinged expansion.

== Seventh Edition ==
Seventh Edition
- The Number 7
- Released: April 2, 2001
- Size: 350 cards (110 commons, 110 uncommons, 110 rares, 20 basic lands)
- Expansion code: 7ED
← Planeshift	Apocalypse →

Seventh Edition was a Magic: The Gathering set released on April 2, 2001. It is the only core set since the original Limited Edition to have introduced all-new art for every card. The set contained 350 cards. The expansion symbol was a stylized 7.

Despite being an "Advanced" level set, Seventh Edition contained a separate basic subset for new players similar to the products that were previously offered as Starter 2000. Cards that appeared in the Seventh Edition Starter special pre-constructed theme decks did not appear in boosters. This would be the last starter level product released by Wizards of the Coast.

Seventh Edition was the last base set printed in the 'old' frame; Eighth Edition introduced the modern card frame. Seventh was the first base set to contain foil cards, which were printed with black borders. It was the last base set to be released prior to the final expansion of the then-current block (Seventh Edition was released before Apocalypse). Starting with Eighth Edition, the base set editions (which, with 8th, would become known as Core Set editions) were released after the last expansion of the then-current block and before the first expansion of the subsequent block.

Unusually for a core set, Seventh featured a loose storyline that tied together most of the cards in a core set, a practice usually reserved for expansion sets. The story involved a conflict between the North, South, East, and West Paladins. Magic Origins, 14 years later, would also feature a loose story.

== Eighth Edition ==
Eighth Edition
- Released: July 28, 2003
- Size: 357 cards (110 commons, 110 uncommons, 110 rares, 20 basic lands, 7 starter)
- Expansion code: 8ED
← Scourge	Mirrodin →

Eighth Edition, also known as Core Set, was a Magic: The Gathering set released on July 28, 2003. Its expansion symbol is the number 8 with 3 cards behind it. Eighth Edition was released to coincide with the 10th anniversary of the original release of Magic. Every previous expansion had at least one card reprinted in Eighth that had not been reprinted in the base set before, with a series of votes on the Wizards website deciding what got reprinted. Eighth was also the first base set with a promotional card given to players who played in a prerelease tournament. Eighth features many cards from older base sets and expansions. While many of these cards were powerful during their original print run, on the whole they were not perceived as measuring up to the power in Standard at the time, known for "Affinity" decks powered by cards from the Mirrodin block. Thus, few cards in Eighth Edition saw tournament play.

A new card face was introduced in Eighth Edition. The colored frames around the edges of the card were redesigned and narrowed, boxes were placed around card names and creatures' power and toughness, card names were printed in a new font (Matrix Bold, rather than Goudy Medieval), artifacts switched from a brown background to a silvery-white background, and mana symbols appearing in the text box were no longer colored. The later two changes themselves were changed shortly thereafter; in Fifth Dawn, the artifact face was darkened to be more distinguishable from white cards. In Champions of Kamigawa, Wizards restored colored mana symbols in card text boxes.

Several tournament staples which had appeared in 7th Edition, including Opposition, Llanowar Elves, Counterspell, and Duress, were not present in Eighth Edition. The Circle of Protection series, a perennial core set entity, remained in the set but changed from common to uncommon. A number of simple cards, such as Vizzerdrix, were reprinted only for products directed at new players and were not present in booster packs.

== Ninth Edition ==
Ninth Edition
- The number nine superimposed over a trio of fanned cards
- Released: July 29, 2005
- Size: 359 (110 rares, 110 uncommons, 110 commons, 20 lands, 9 starter)
- Keywords: Aura
← Saviors of Kamigawa	Ravnica: City of Guilds →

Ninth Edition was a Magic set released on July 29, 2005. It continued Eighth Edition's terminology change of referring to itself as a core set. Ninth Edition contained 350 cards available in booster packs, all reprints from earlier Magic sets. Similar to Eight Edition, the Ninth Edition Core Game contained 9 "starter cards", labeled with the collector numbers S1 through S10 (there is no card labeled S6, however), which were not available in booster packs. These were simple "vanilla" creatures, such as Eager Cadet, which were designed to introduce new players to the game.

Ninth Edition features only mechanics present in previous expansions. However, Ninth Edition does modify the list of mechanics considered suitable for base sets. The trample and protection mechanics were included after being removed from Classic Sixth Edition and later base sets. Equipment, first introduced in the Mirrodin set, is also in Ninth Edition, although it was moved up in rarity. Furthermore, all mechanics now have reminder text; mechanics such as flying and trample did not in earlier sets. Ninth Edition is also the first set to be printed using the new template for enchantments. Previously, enchantments that were played on other permanents were called "local enchantments" and were printed with the type "Enchant creature", "Enchant land", etc. With the Champions of Kamigawa set, Wizards of the Coast made an effort to simplify the type line, which had contained rules interactions that were not written on the card. "Enchant [entity]" was changed to "Enchantment - Aura" and the targeting restriction moved to the text box. Mark Gottlieb explained the changes in the article "Aura Hygiene". Errata was issued to make all such cards conform to this template, and Ninth Edition became the first set where the cards were actually printed with this changed wording.

With Ninth Edition came a redesign of Fat Packs, special products that came with an array of both booster packs and side Magic items such as life counters. The Fat Pack consisted of two boxes wrapped around by a card box wrapper featuring new art. The player's guide was also reduced in size but was now sturdier. Also added were 6 divider pieces with artwork for inside the boxes.

As of 2013, Ninth Edition is the last Magic set to be printed with white borders. The set's premium foil cards were printed with black borders. Cards made available in Cyrillic when Ninth Edition was marketed in Russia also were black-bordered; this marked the first time a new language had been printed for the game since Simplified Chinese was added to Fifth Edition.

== Tenth Edition ==
Tenth Edition
- Tenth Edition expansion symbol (X, Roman numeral for 10)
- Released: July 13, 2007
- Size: 383 (121 rares, 121 uncommons, 121 commons, 20 basic land)
← Future Sight	Lorwyn →

Tenth Edition was a Magic set released on July 13, 2007, replacing Ninth Edition as the core set of cards for standard tournament play. The symbol for Tenth Edition is the Roman numeral "X". As part of their "Selecting Tenth Edition" promotion, Wizards of the Coast gave fans the chance to manage a part of the set's brand. The results gave the Roman numeral "X" over the number "10", along with many other card, art, and flavor text choices. Tenth Edition was the first core set since Beta to be printed with black-bordered cards, rather than white-bordered ones. Tenth Edition is also the first core set to include legendary creatures (two of each color), bringing back flavorful relics of Magic's past such as Squee, Goblin Nabob, and Kamahl, Pit Fighter.

As with Eighth and Ninth Edition, part of the development process for Tenth Edition included allowing fans to select certain cards for inclusion in the set. This process began in mid-June 2006 and continued for 10 weeks. Tenth Edition starter packs include land cards from Magic's next set, Lorwyn.

Foil cards in Tenth Edition do not have reminder text. Many use the extra space to add flavor text that does not appear on the nonfoil versions. Others, such as Time Stop, simply center their existing text in the text box for added impact.

The keywords defender, double strike, equip, fear, first strike, flash, flying, haste, landwalk, lifelink, protection, reach, regeneration, shroud, trample, and vigilance are in Tenth Edition. Of these, defender, double strike, flash, lifelink, reach and shroud appeared in core sets for the first time. Tenth Edition also reprinted several cards from previous sets with changed rarity, such as Chromatic Star and Fog Elemental.
