= Odyssey (Magic: The Gathering) =

Block of expansion sets in Magic: The Gathering

- The Mirari, a metal orb on a helix
- Released: September 21, 2001
- Size: 350 cards (110 common, 110 uncommon, 110 rare, 20 basic land)
- Keywords: Threshold, Flashback
- Mechanics: Discard, Graveyard effects
- Development code: Argon
- Expansion code: ODY

First set in the Odyssey block
Odyssey	Torment	Judgment
← Apocalypse	Deckmasters 2001 →
← Invasion Block	Onslaught Block →

Torment
- Released: February 8, 2002
- Size: 143 cards (55 common, 44 uncommon, 44 rare)
- Keywords: Flashback, Threshold, Madness
- Mechanics: Nightmares
- Development code: Boron
- Expansion code: TOR

Second set in the Odyssey block
Odyssey	Torment	Judgment
← Deckmasters 2001	Judgment →
← Invasion Block	Onslaught Block →

Judgment
- Released: May 27, 2002
- Size: 143 cards (55 common, 44 uncommon, 44 rare)
- Mechanics: Advocates, Incarnations, Nightmares, Phantoms, Wishes
- Development code: Carbon
- Expansion code: JUD

Third set in the Odyssey block
Odyssey	Torment	Judgment
← Torment	Onslaught →
← Invasion Block	Onslaught Block →

The Odyssey is a Magic: The Gathering expert-level block. It consists of a trio of expansion sets: Odyssey (September, 2001), Torment (February, 2002) and Judgment (May, 2002).

== Storyline ==
=== Odyssey ===
The storyline of Odyssey leaps forward 100 years after the events in the set Apocalypse on the remote continent Otaria. Odyssey's protagonist is Kamahl, a formidable fighter-mage skilled in both throwing fireballs and melee combat. Kamahl has a close friend Chainer, a cabalist, and a cool-headed sister Jeska. The antagonist is Laquatus, a sly merfolk who uses trickery and mind control to bend others to his will. Other characters include the cephalid emperor Aboshan, Kamahl's centaur friend Seton, Kamahl and Jeska's dwarven trainer Balthor, the militaristic Kirtar, the mellow but dangerous Cabal Patriarch (The First), and the unpredictable sociopath Braids. Almost everyone in the story is after the Mirari, a legendary artifact of immense power with the ability to make its wielder's innermost wishes come true. The Mirari is relatively small, resembling a metallic ball mounted on a wiry helix. The Mirari notoriously drives its wielder insane, often causing death and massive destruction, whereupon it awaits a new master.

The Magic: The Gathering Creative Team began a new approach to Magic's storyline starting with Odyssey. Changes include:

- The 13 previous sets' storyline, beginning in Weatherlight and climaxing in Apocalypse, that depicted the adventures of Urza Planeswalker, Gerrard Capashen and the Weatherlight crew's crusade against the Phyrexians, is no longer being chronicled. For Odyssey, a new story begins in a new setting with a new cast of characters.
- Kamahl is a red protagonist (Red is the color of chaos, destruction, and impulse).
- Laquatus is a blue antagonist (Blue is the color of knowledge, trickery, and now, even deceit).
- Odyssey portrays black themes that include the entertainment and glory of the pit fights mixed with capitalism. These themes offer a new variation of evil to black's themes in previous storylines, which included genocide, soul-harvesting, and finding the most agonizing torture for captive victims.
- New storylines can be as short as three sets, and each storyline can be revisited or cross paths (for an example, see Mirrodin's storyline).

=== Torment ===
Torment tells the story of Chainer, a Dementia Summoner of the Cabal, who first discovers the Mirari and rises through the ranks of the Cabal, eventually becoming rival to the Cabal Patriarch himself.

=== Judgment ===
Having mortally wounded his sister, Jeska, with his own sword, Kamahl leaves her to the care of his centaur friend, Seton, and sets out on a quest to find a way to heal her. Her wound festers from the might of the Mirari, currently fixed to the pommel of Kamahl's sword. Meanwhile, Laquatus schemes as much as ever to persuade Empress Llawan to aid him in finding the Mirari. Along with his bodyguard Burke (Laquatus' Champion), the ever-demented Braids, and Commander Eesha of the Aven, each plays a part in the war over the Mirari. Kamahl trains with the Nantuko Thriss in Krosa in Druidic magic and ultimately confronts Laquatus in a showdown. Upon victory, Kamahl slams his sword into the ground, granting his wish and bringing life and growth to the surrounding environment (Mirari's Wake), though he cannot cure his dying sister's wound.

== Set history ==
=== Odyssey ===
Odyssey's main theme is the graveyard. All the colors interact with the graveyard and use it as a resource, though green and black are the strongest graveyard colors. Previously, the graveyard rarely affected gameplay, but Odyssey's cards forced players to constantly keep track of both graveyards at all times.

Odyssey's secondary theme is token creatures. Throughout the Odyssey block, all the colors receive more token creatures than usual, and green's token generating spells are some of the most powerful tokens generators in Magic history. This was because if spells had Flashback they could be played from the graveyard for its Flashback cost and would be removed from the game once it resolved. This essentially allowed you to play the same spell twice. The most notable card among these was Call of the Herd which was later reprinted as one of the Time Spiral 'Timeshifted' cards.

Many of Magic's marquee races like Elves and Goblins are completely absent from Otaria. White is represented by Nomads and the Aven birds of The Order; Blue has the deceitful, octopus-like Cephalids; Black is plagued by the Horrors and Minions of Cabal summoners; Red showcases Dwarves, Firecats, and Barbarians of the Pardic mountains; and Green is rife with Centaurs, Squirrels, and the insect-like Nantuko druids of the Krosan forest.

=== Torment ===
Torment, which focused on black, is unique in that it is the first set to focus on a single color. It has 40 Black cards, 28 Blue cards, 28 Red cards, 21 Green Cards and 21 White cards. This imbalance is, however, balanced by the release of the third expansion set in the Odyssey Block, Judgment. Torment's release marked a tremendous power boost to the color black. The "Swamp Rewards" cards along with Chainer's Edict and Nantuko Shade were incredibly potent in tournament play, spawning the MonoBlack Control archetype (or the more appropriately named Coffers Control) that could destroy its opponent's creatures, hand, and life total with large Cabal Coffers-fueled spells. Previously, control decks were almost synonymous with blue counter-based control decks, but after Torment it was no longer a fact that a control deck was unviable without countermagic.

Relative to other mechanics at the time, Torment's Madness mechanic proved to be overpowered, most notably on Circular Logic, Basking Rootwalla, and Arrogant Wurm. This gave rise to U/G Madness (pronounced "Blue-Green Madness"), an Aggro-Control archetype fundamentally built on Wild Mongrel and Aquamoeba as discard outlets to utilize the Madness, Flashback, and Threshold mechanics of Odyssey Block. U/G Madness is notable for being format-dominating, inexpensive to build, easy to play, and almost exclusively utilizing Odyssey Block cards. U/G Madness and Coffers Control are good examples of the player-perceived criticism that "R&D is making our decks for us."

=== Judgment ===
This is the second expansion set made that did not have an equal number cards from each color. The first expansion with such an imbalance was its predecessor, the Torment expansion set, which was skewed towards the color black. The Judgment expansion set was meant to balance this, and skews towards green and white, black's enemy colors. The expansion symbol for Judgment was a scale. The set contains 33 Green cards, 33 White cards, 27 Red cards, 27 Blue cards and 16 Black cards. All multicolored cards in the set are both green and white.

With the release of Judgment, the Wishes (specifically Burning Wish, Cunning Wish, and Living Wish) offered a radical new approach to deckbuilding in tournament play. Control decks and Combo decks across multiple formats revolutionized themselves with the method of devoting sideboard space for combo pieces and silver bullets. In essence, this made the maindeck stronger but the smaller sideboard made postboard games weaker. Burning Wish received DCI attention after it was showcased in an absurdly powerful Vintage deck called "Long.dec" where multiple Burning Wishes were used to abuse a single Yawgmoth's Will in the sideboard, the deck would then traditionally win using Tendrils of Agony (which could also be searched up using Burning Wish). This tournament-legal combo deck boasted an incredible 60% 1st Turn Kill rate, making it one of the most powerful Magic decks ever. Burning Wish was thus restricted in Vintage by the DCI on December 1, 2003, making it a good candidate for the most powerful card in Judgment.

== Mechanics ==
Odyssey introduced two graveyard-centered mechanics. One was flashback. Spells with flashback can be played again from the graveyard, essentially getting a second use out of the spell. However, using a Flashback ability removes the card from the game. The other is the ability word threshold, which, when printed on spells and creatures, rewards players for having seven or more cards in the graveyard.

Torment continued the Flashback and Threshold mechanics began in Odyssey and introduced Madness. When a card with Madness is discarded, it can usually be played at a reduced cost. Torment sports 10 Madness cards, a common and an uncommon for each of the five colors. The "black corruption" theme of Torment spreads beyond sheer numbers of cards. There are a number of other cards that focus on black or swamps, including cards that reward players for controlling swamps, "tainted" lands, flashbacks that required loss of life, nightmares and possessed creatures.

Judgment continues Odyssey's Flashback, Threshold and Punisher mechanics and Torment's Nightmare creatures in the form of Wormfangs and Gorgers. It also contains a cycle of wishes that allow you to search for cards from outside the game, and a cycle of incarnation creatures that granted abilities to creatures in play as long as they were in the graveyard.

== Reception ==
Odyssey was a poorly received set. Mark Rosewater, the lead designer for Odyssey, claimed that the set was the one from which he learnt the most as a designer, as it was the set in which he made his biggest mistakes. Rosewater went into the Odyssey design deciding he wanted to challenge notions of card advantage. Looking back on this he states that he was doing this for himself at the expense of the audience at large. Other design mistakes highlighted by Rosewater included the Threshold mechanic. The mechanic forced players to keep track of the number of cards in their opponent's graveyard and which cards could put cards into the graveyard. It was found that this was largely not enjoyable for players.

Another problem with Odyssey that Rosewater has discussed is that the storyline and flavor of the set did not match its graveyard-focused mechanics. He explains that this was because there used to be little interaction between the development team and the creative team. Rosewater recalls talking with Brady Dommermuth, an editor for the game at the time, who suggested that a gothic horror theme would have better suited the set's design. Rosewater would later become the head designer of Magic and Dommermuth the creative director. This would lead to the Innistrad set, released in 2011, that returned to the graveyard themes explored in Odyssey but this time with a gothic horror theme. The Flashback mechanic would also return in Innistrad.

== Notable cards ==
Notable cards from Odyssey include Entomb, Nimble Mongoose, Psychatog, Shadowmage Infiltrator and Standstill.

Notable cards from Judgment include *Burning Wish and Cabal Therapy

=== Psychatog ===

Psychatog is a blue-black Magic: The Gathering creature card printed at the "uncommon" level of rarity in the Odyssey expansion set in 2001. Its abilities, which allow the player to strengthen it by discarding cards or removing cards in the graveyard (discard pile) from the game, resulted in Psychatog being labeled "broken" (overpowered) by players; in an online poll conducted in 2002 at Magicthegathering.com, 35.9% of respondents said they believed that printing Psychatog had been a mistake. Six of the top eight players at the 2002 World Championship used Psychatog-based decks, including the winner, Carlos Romão. It is one of a cycle of multicolored Atogs.

The multi-colored atogs in Odyssey were intended as hybrids of the earlier, single-color atogs. Psychatog is a hybrid of the black Necratog(from Weatherlight) and the blue Chronatog(from Visions), and this is reflected in the card's art. Psychatog has a modified version of Necratog's ability to "eat" cards in the graveyard, but it was felt that Chronatog's ability, which involves skipping turns, should not be continued in Psychatog. It was initially replaced with an ability that required removing 7 cards from the player's library (deck); running out of cards means losing the game, placing a limit on how many times this ability could be used. After developer William Jockusch showed that this could be circumvented simply by using a large enough deck, the number of cards removed was increased to 10, but even this was felt to be too powerful — Battle of Wits, a card that wins the game for players with more than 200 cards in their library, was being planned for the same set, giving players more incentive to use unusually large decks. Eventually the "library-eating" ability was replaced with its current discard ability.

== Theme decks ==
=== Torment ===
With the focus on black within the set all the theme decks for the Torment set featured black paired with another color.

- Grave Danger is a blue and black deck that focuses on using the graveyard with cards such as Organ Grinder and Psychatog. The two rares in this deck are Cephalid Vandal and False Memories.
- Insanity is a green and black beatdown deck. The two rares in this deck are Nantuko Blightcutter and Nantuko Cultivator.
- Sacrilege is a white and black graveyard-based utility deck, featuring cards that placed creatures into the graveyard and others that returned them from the graveyard. The two rares in this deck are Angel of Retribution and Ichorid.
- Waking Nightmares is a red and black control deck featuring many of the 'Nightmare' creature cards from the set. The two rares in the deck are Chainer, Dementia Master and Petradon.
