= Ice Age (Magic: The Gathering) =

Block of expansion sets in Magic: The Gathering

- Released: June 1995
- Size: 383 cards (121 commons, 121 uncommons, 121 rares, 20 basic lands)
- Keywords: Cumulative Upkeep
- Mechanics: Allied color alliances, cantrips, Snow lands
- Designers: Skaff Elias, Jim Lin, Dave Pettey and Chris Page
- Development code: Ice Age
- Expansion code: ICE

First set in the Ice Age block
Ice Age	Alliances	Coldsnap
← 4th Edition	Chronicles →
← No previous blocks	Mirage Block →

Alliances
- banner
- Released: June 10, 1996
- Size: 199 cards (144 functionally different)
- Keywords: Cumulative Upkeep
- Mechanics: Allied color, cantrips, pitch spells, snow lands
- Designers: Skaff Elias, Jim Lin, Dave Pettey and Chris Page
- Development code: Quack
- Expansion code: ALL

Second set in the Ice Age block
Ice Age	Alliances	Coldsnap
← Homelands	Mirage →
← No previous blocks	Mirage Block →

Coldsnap
- icicles
- Released: July 21, 2006
- Size: 155 (40 rares, 55 uncommons, 60 commons)
- Keywords: Cumulative Upkeep, Ripple, Recover
- Mechanics: Snow Supertype, Pitch Cards
- Designers: Bill Rose (lead), Aaron Forsythe, Devin Low, and Mark Rosewater
- Developers: Randy Buehler Jr. (lead), Devin Low, Zvi Mowshowitz, and Michael Turian
- Development code: Splat
- Expansion code: CSP

Third set in the Ice Age block
Ice Age	Alliances	Coldsnap
← Dissension	Time Spiral →
← No previous blocks	Mirage Block →

Ice Age is a block of three expansion sets in Magic: The Gathering, consisting of the Ice Age, Alliances and Coldsnap sets. It is also the titular first set in the block. The Ice Age set is the eleventh set and the sixth expansion set, previewed at the Canadian Card and Comics Spectacular in early June 1995, and released later that month. Set in the years from 450 to 2934 AR, the set describes a world set in perpetual winter due to the events in Antiquities. Ice Age was followed up June 1996 with Alliances, the fourteenth Magic: The Gathering set and eighth expansion set.; and on July 21, 2006 with Coldsnap. The time period between Alliances and Coldsnap was the longest period of time between the beginning and the completion of a full block in Magic. Originally, the set Homelands, released in October 1995, was the second set in the Ice Age block (with Alliances being the third set), but following the release of Coldsnap, Homelands was removed from the block in favor of Coldsnap.

== Storyline ==
=== Ice Age ===
The Brothers' War, referenced in the set Antiquities and the Urza block, has thrown Dominaria into a drastic climate change. The temperature has dropped sharply and a new Ice Age has begun. Most of society has been lost; all that remains are the soldier nation of Kjeldor, the barbarians of Balduvia, and the elvish society of Fyndhorn. These people must battle against the necromancer Lim-Dûl who has begun to conduct twisted experiments. Meanwhile, the wizard Zur the Enchanter trains new wizards to survive in the harsh environment.

=== Alliances ===
The story follows the events of Ice Age, after the so-called goddess (actually a planeswalker) Freyalise had used her magic to end the Ice Age. As the lands grew warmer, conflicts began to erupt. The Balduvian Barbarians were under constant attacks from a vigilante group headed by a former Kjeldoran knight, General Varchild, and needed to turn to their former foes for help. The Soldevi alliance was breaking down amid fears that their unearthing of artifacts of the Brothers' War (as described in Antiquities) could restart that destructive conflict. And all the while, the wicked necromancer known as Lim-Dûl gathered forces to conquer the entire world.

== Set history ==
=== Ice Age ===
Ice Age was the first "stand-alone" expansion; that is, it was the first set that could be played independently of other Magic: The Gathering products. It was the first expansion to reprint all five basic lands. Ice Age is also the first set that was printed for a certain period. Previous sets had a previously specified print run and were then sold while supplies lasted. It was sold in 60-card starter decks and 15-card booster packs, the latter with no basic land cards.

As Ice Age was the first "stand-alone" expansion set, the designers believed that some "staple" cards from the basic set and expansions should be in the set. Thus, the set was also the first expansion set (aside from the Arabian Nights Mountain misprint) to reprint cards. About 8% of the cards in the set were reprints of previously published cards. Another 8% of the cards were functional reprints of already-printed cards; that is, aside from the name (and possibly the creature type), these cards were identical to cards in other sets.

Ice Age was the first Magic expansion that was released in French, German, Portuguese, and Spanish.

=== Alliances ===
Alliances experimented with different levels of rarities of cards. There are 49 rares in the set, three of these being artifacts that are actually three times as common as the other rares, thus making them just as common as most uncommons. Alliances was the last set to have multiple cards (other than basic lands) with more than one artistic conception.

Alliances was the only set besides Chronicles to be sold in 12 card packs. Each pack included one rare card, three uncommon, and eight common cards.

The set is probably best known for the card "Force of Will" which allows a player to counter a spell without paying its mana cost by exiling another blue card from their hand.

Paul Pettengale reviewed Alliances for Arcane magazine, rating it an 8 out of 10 overall. Pettengale comments that "There are cards within the Alliances set which are really going to shake up the game of Magic, forcing players to reconsider some of the traditional cards combinations, defence tactics and aggressive routines, and because of this it's a highly refreshing release."

=== Coldsnap ===
In the initial announcement, Randy Buehler said that Coldsnap was designed around the same time as Ice Age and Alliances but was never released because "internal politics" had "forced" Wizards to release Homelands instead. However, in the Ask Wizards section on November 10, 2005, a player pointed to several inconsistencies in Buehler's story and suggested that Coldsnap was in fact a newly designed set. Mark Rosewater confirmed in his February 6, 2006 column that the "from the vault" story was a "cute little cover" to make the announcement more interesting and expressed surprise that any players took the story at face value. He apologized for the confusion Wizards R&D had created and made it clear that the set is indeed a newly designed one.

== Mechanics ==
Several mechanics were introduced in the Ice Age block. The most notable of these was permanents of the "Snow" supertype. Ice Age introduced basic snow-covered lands, and cards that had effects based on Snow permanents. 'Coldsnap followed that with creatures, artifacts and enchantments of the Snow supertype. Other mechanics introduced included cumulative upkeep and cantrips. Ice Age was also the first set to print single-colored legends.

Alliances did not introduce any new named mechanics, but did introduce a number of cards that could be cast by discarding one or more cards instead of paying a mana cost.

Besides expanding on the cumulative upkeep, pitch cards and snow permanents mechanics, Coldsnap introduced the Recover and Ripple mechanics.

== Cards ==
Ice Age consists of 383 cards. Of these 121 each are common, uncommon, and rare. The remaining 20 cards are basic lands distributed solely in Starter Packs. There were 56 cards of each color, 25 multicolor cards, 45 artifacts, and 33 lands in Ice Age.

There are 199 cards in Alliances. Including alternate art, there are 31 cards of each color, 10 multicolor cards, 26 Artifacts, and 8 Lands.

Coldsnap contained 155 cards. Four theme decks were released, which included some cards that were reprints of older cards from both Ice Age and Alliances. The reprints kept the original artwork but used the new borders, updated Oracle wording and the original expansion symbols were given rarity colors.

=== Notable cards ===
Notable cards in Ice Age included Necropotence, Zuran Orb, and Jester's Cap

Notable cards in Alliances included Balduvian Horde, Force of Will, Lake of the Dead, Pillage, and Thawing Glaciers

Notable cards in Coldsnap included Counterbalance, Dark Depths, Rite of Flame, Braid of Fire, and Vanish Into Memory.

== Reviews ==
- Rollespilsmagasinet Fønix (Danish) (Issue 9 - August/September 1995)
