= Mirage (Magic: The Gathering) =

Block of expansion sets in Magic: The Gathering

- palm tree
- Released: October 1996; December 5, 2005 (MTGO)
- Size: 350 cards (110 commons, 110 uncommons, 110 rares, 20 basic lands)
- Keywords: Flanking, phasing
- Mechanics: Poison, Nightstalkers, Insta-Enchantments
- Designers: Bill Rose (lead), Joel Mick, Charlie Catino, Don Felice, Howard Kahlenberg, Elliot Segal
- Development code: Sosumi/Menagerie
- Expansion code: MIR

First set in the Mirage block
| Mirage | Visions | Weatherlight |
| ← Alliances | Visions → |
| ← Ice Age Block | Rath Block → |

Visions
- Zhalfirin Triangle of War or stylized letter "V"
- Released: February 1997; April 10, 2006 (MTGO)
- Size: 167 cards (62 commons, 55 uncommons, 50 rares)
- Keywords: Flanking, Phasing, cumulative upkeep
- Mechanics: Come into play abilities, poison, insta-enchantments
- Designers: Bill Rose (lead), Joel Mick, Charlie Catino, Don Felice, Howard Kahlenberg, Elliot Segal
- Development code: Mirage, Jr.
- Expansion code: VIS

Second set in the Mirage block
| Mirage | Visions | Weatherlight |
| ← Mirage | 5th Edition → |
| ← Ice Age Block | Rath Block → |

Weatherlight
- Thran Tome
- Released: June 1997; December 12, 2007 (MTGO)
- Size: 167 cards (62 commons, 55 uncommons, 50 rares)
- Keywords: Flanking, Phasing, Cumulative Upkeep
- Mechanics: Graveyard matters
- Development code: Mochalatte
- Expansion code: WTH

Third set in the Mirage block
| Mirage | Visions | Weatherlight |
| ← Portal | Tempest → |
| ← Ice Age Block | Rath Block → |

Mirage was the first official block structure in Magic: The Gathering. This new block structure consisted of three expansion sets and would continue for nearly two decades, finally ending with Khans of Tarkir in 2014. The new block structure also set up the precedent that the first set in the block also became the name for the entire block. Mirage block consisted of three sets: Mirage, Visions and Weatherlight.

== Storyline ==
The story concerns three of the most powerful nations of Jamuraa (a tropical continent modeled after Africa)—the militaristic kingdom of the Zhalfirins, the religious state of Femeref, and the trading province of the Suq'Ata empire. Zhalfir was the warrior nation, based mainly on red. Femeref was mainly white, and featured clerics and healers, while the seafaring traders of Suq'Ata were mostly blue. Mirage concerned these three nations and their struggle against the evil wizard Kaervek. Kaervek has imprisoned the powerful wizard and diplomat Mangara in an amber prison, and the bulk of the story details the Jamuraans attempting to free Mangara. In addition to these events, the planeswalker Teferi has caused his island to disappear from existence for almost 200 years. It is the phasing of the entire island that led Kaervek and Mangara to Jamuraa in the first place.

By the time of Visions, Femeref has been destroyed and Suq'Ata and Zhalfir begin to have internal problems as well. There is hope, however, when Kaervek's ally Jolrael betrays him at the urging of the planeswalker Teferi. Jamuraa's leaders, led by Jolrael's visions, free Mangara from the amber prison and begin to fight against Kaervek.

The storyline of Weatherlight is closely tied to the Weatherlight Saga. The story introduces the Weatherlight and her crew, who travel the planes of the multiverse in search of ancient artifacts known collectively as the Legacy. The captain of the ship, Sisay, is abducted to the shadowy world of Rath. Her old friend and crewmate, a former soldier named Gerrard, is pressed into taking command of the ship to rescue her. The story is continued in Magic's Tempest set.

=== Weatherlight Saga ===
The Weatherlight set was accompanied by a series of fictional works collectively known as the Weatherlight Saga. The saga was intended to be a "hero's journey"-style story, in which the characters were classic archetypes. Each was also assigned to represent a color in Magic's color wheel, so that the narrative and mechanical elements of the project would be more closely joined.

Then-developer Mark Rosewater chose the skyship Weatherlight and its captain, Sisay, as the germ of the new story. Rosewater has stated that making the story about a ship allowed for narrative flexibility in setting. After developing story and character ideas with Michael Ryan, Rosewater pitched the Saga idea to his bosses. The Saga was heavily referenced in the flavor text and card names of the set.

Weatherlight marks a turning point in design and marketing philosophy for the Magic game and brand. While previous sets included allusions to an overarching story, Weatherlight was the first set to explicitly tell an ordered narrative focused on developed, archetypical characters. Weatherlight marks the first use of a metaplot tied to a Magic set. The first novel, Rath and Storm, covers events shown in the Weatherlight set, while later novels tell stories for later game sets. It is referenced in sets until Apocalypse, although the aftermath of Saga events continued to be explored thereafter.

== Set history ==
=== Mirage ===
Like Ice Age, Mirage began as a set of modifications to Alpha by a group of Richard Garfield's playtesters in winter 1992. Bill Rose, Charlie Catino, Joel Mick, Howard Kahlenberg, Don Felice and Elliott Segal created gameplay modifications and new cards that developed into "Menagerie", which developed over the course of three years. In October 1995, Mirage was sent to Wizards of the Coast for development. Rose led the development team of Mike Elliott, William Jockusch and Mark Rosewater, while Art Director Sue-Ann Harkey provided Mirage's African influenced look.

Mirage was created as an introduction to Jamuraa, with two more planned expansions to create a cohesive set. This model became the standard for Magic: The Gathering expansions and began the concept of "block rotation".

Mirage's public debut was at Pro Tour Atlanta 1996, where professional Magic players had the challenge of playing sealed deck with cards they had never seen before. Mirage was also the first set to have pre-releases at more than one city.

Wizards of the Coast's design and development team considers Mirage to be the first set of the "Silver Age" or "modern" era of Magic. It was the first set to be designed with Limited and Constructed play in mind. Previous designs had been imbalanced for formats like draft and sealed-deck, and cards were designed for casual players rather than with thought of their impact on the tournament scene.

On December 5, 2005, Mirage was released on Magic: The Gathering Online and was the first retroactively released set there. This was the first time in the three-and-a-half years that the online version of the game had existed that an expansion older than Invasion (2000) became playable on MTG Online. With their introduction on MTG Online, all Mirage cards received updated creature types and wordings to bring them in line with modern Magic cards.

It also introduced 5th Edition rules (5th Edition was released in March 1997).

=== Visions ===
The Visions expansion originated as a split from "Menagerie" (the original name for Mirage), which had grown too large for a single set. For a brief time during its development, Visions was known by the codename "Mirage Jr." It received its final name shortly later. Visions was the first set to have the same name as a Magic card printed earlier, and the first set to have a wide dispersal of pre-releases. A subset of 25 cards were randomly included in 15-card booster packs packaged in the Magic: The Gathering Multiverse Gift Box released months before Visions official release.

At the time of its release, Visions was a "first" in the release of quality cards at the common level. For instance, River Boa was considered "very good" compared to other green creatures, with two abilities (Islandwalk and Regeneration) and a 2/1 power/toughness at a casting cost of only two mana.

Visions was the last set to contain a poison creature (one that creates poison counters) until Swamp Mosquito was reprinted in Time Spiral. Visions's Suq'Ata Assassin was the last new poison creature created by Wizards for 10 years, until Virulent Sliver appeared in Future Sight.

Wizards of the Coast started selling Visions cards for Magic: The Gathering Online on April 10, 2006. The cards became legal to use in several formats as they went on sale. Official release events were held on April 13.

== Mechanics ==
Mirage introduced the first cycle of "charms". A charm is a spell that allow a player to choose among three different effects when the charm is played. Since then, similar cycles of charms have appeared in the Invasion block, Onslaught block, Return to Ravnica block, and others. Mirage also introduced a cycle of enchantments that could be played as instants. It introduced two keywords: flanking and phasing. A creature without flanking gets -1/-1 until end of turn if it blocks a creature with flanking. A permanent with phasing leaves play under certain circumstances, then returns to play at the beginning of its controller's next turn.

Phasing and flanking were expanded upon in Visions. Visions included many creatures that had abilities that triggered upon entering play. Visions introduced a cycle of lands known as Karoo lands that require a player to return a land already in play to their hand before playing the Karoo land, with the upside of producing 2 mana (one colored, one colorless) instead of just 1.

Although Weatherlight is considered the third set in the Mirage block, it is mechanically distinct and does not prominently feature the keywords introduced in Mirage. Phasing appears on only three cards in Weatherlight, and flanking on only two. Weatherlight again had a cycle of cantrips, albeit ones that gave a player a card immediately after being played. Many cards in Weatherlight had graveyard-related abilities. Weatherlight was the last set to print a card with banding before the keyword was abandoned. It reintroduced the cumulative upkeep keyword with cards whose effects scaled as their cumulative upkeep costs increased. (Cumulative upkeep would not be used again until 2006's Coldsnap).

== Notable cards ==
Notable cards in Mirage include Enlightened Tutor, Lion's Eye Diamond, Flash, Mystical Tutor, and Phyrexian Dreadnought.

Notable cards in Visions include Natural Order and Vampiric Tutor.

Notable cards in Weatherlight include Gemstone Mine and Null Rod

== Art ==
For Mirage, Wizards signed about 50 artists who had not worked on Magic before, including fan favorites such as John Avon and Donato Giancola. It was the first set for which Sue Ann Harkey was the art director.

The art depicted on Mirage cards was inspired by African art motifs that depicted a "sophisticated society".

== Reception ==
Paul Pettengale reviewed Mirage for Arcane magazine, rating it a 9 out of 10 overall, and stated that "This is a superb expansion to the Magic multiverse, with new rules which add greater depth to the game, better artwork than any previous set, and enough new cards to make it fully playable as a stand-alone."

Paul Pettengale reviewed Visions for Arcane magazine, rating it a 7 out of 10 overall, and stated that "Despite having the same, high-quality artwork boasted by the Mirage expansion, and despite being set in the same area of Dominia, Visions fails to live up to the playability of Mirage. It has some real gem cards thrown into the mix but the set as a whole fails to alter the game in any way and, to my mind, that's just what an expansion should do."

== Reviews ==
- Backstab #2
