= War of the Spark =

Magic: The Gathering expansion set

- Released: May 3, 2019
- Size: 264 cards
- Expansion code: WAR
← Ravnica Allegiance	Throne of Eldraine →

War of the Spark is the 81st Magic: The Gathering expansion; while it is not part of a block, this set is functionally the third part of a Ravnica-focused storyline set on the plane of Ravnica. It was released on May 3, 2019. It also became available in MTG Arena on April 25, 2019.

== Story ==
The War of the Spark set features the culmination of Nicol Bolas' plan and the storyline focuses on the battle unfolding on Ravnica "between the evil Nicol Bolas, the youngest and most powerful of Magic's seven Elder Dragons, and the Gatewatch, a loose alliance of Planeswalkers fighting on the side of good". Over the course of previous sets, Bolas has been enacting parts of his plan: during the Kaladesh block, "he stole a planar portal that would allow him to transport non-natural materials between worlds"; during the Amonkhet block, he "collected an army of zombified and embalmed warriors known as Eternals"; during the Ixalan block, "he collected the Immortal Sun, a powerful tool that is designed to prevent Planeswalkers from travelling between worlds"; and finally during the Dominaria set, he brought the Planeswalker and Gatewatch member Liliana Vess under his sway.

On the story design, Mark Rosewater wrote, "The Creative team had been mapping out the Bolas Arc. We knew that we wanted to end with a big dramatic event, one that had a lot riding on it. We also knew that the location of the final event mattered as we wanted there to be some jeopardy; we wanted the players to care that it was happening there. It became apparent pretty quickly that there was one obvious choice—Ravnica. [...] So, we proposed that what we do is first return to Ravnica and give the players what they expect: two sets of guild play (it had to be two sets as ten guilds can't fit into one set). [...] Then, once we'd given the players their fill of guild-infused Ravnica, we could do our big event expansion set on Ravnica, but not specifically about Ravnica. This was a pretty radical idea, (having a set where the importance of an event supersedes the importance of the world) so it took a while to get everyone on board with the plan, but we eventually did".

=== Planeswalkers ===
The set introduces "36 unique planeswalker cards into Standard" and the storyline focuses on the battle between Planeswalkers. At PAX East 2019, the story trailer debuted and highlighted Nicol Bolas as he "ravages the city with his army of undead" before Liliana Vess turns the "massive army against Bolas himself, perched atop the walls of Ravnica. Struggling in the foreground is Gideon Jura, wielding the infamous Blackblade". Gideon Jura, a Planeswalker introduced the 2010 Rise of the Eldrazi set, ultimately dies in the conflict. Nic Kelman, the head of story and entertainment at Wizards of the Coast, said "People know that multiple characters are going to die [...]. They just don't know who. Gideon, we think, will have by far the biggest impact. He's certainly the most pivotal death in the story".

== Mechanics ==
War of the Spark introduced the Amass mechanic. This mechanic represents the undead army Nicol Bolas assembled during the Amonkhet block; it "gets bigger and bigger the more times you amass". Sean Murray, for The Gamer, explained that "in game terms, amass is pretty simple. Whenever you amass, you look at the playing field and see if you've already got an 'army' creature type. [...] If you don't already have an 'army' creature, you create a 0/0 army creature token. [...] The first time you amass, you create the token and put +1/+1 counters on it, while the second time you just make it grow. Thus, you've got an ever-enlarging undead army".

Given the large number of Planeswalkers cards (twenty uncommon, thirteen rare, and four mythic rare Planeswalkers) released in this set, "not every planeswalker could be designed like previous expansions [...]. A planeswalker static ability has several different forms, like removal, beefing up a creature, or working as an enchantment. In addition, loyalty counters are still in place with uncommon planeswalkers only having a minus ability. [...] With so many planeswalkers not having a plus-loyalty counter," the old mechanic Proliferate (introduced in the Scars of Mirrodin block) was brought back. This mechanic is "used to increase planeswalkers loyalty counters and plus one/plus one counters on creatures".

Ethan Gach, for Kotaku, commented that these game mechanics synergize.

== Related products ==
=== Art book ===
The Art of Magic: The Gathering - War of the Spark (2020) by James Wyatt was published by VIZ Media on October 13, 2020. Jon Bitner, for The Gamer, highlighted that this art book is good at both catching up newcomers to the lore of Magic and giving veterans a "deeper understanding". Bitner wrote "its focus is heavily on War of the Spark, but you'll find content reaching back several years to help answers any lingering questions you might have on your mind. In fact, the majority of the 200+ page artbook is dedicated to fleshing out backstory and adding context to War of the Spark. Discussing Nicol Bolas, Planeswalkers, and various Planes of the Multiverse takes up the majority of the early portion of the book, with the 'War of the Spark' section not surfacing until page 170. But all the new artwork in the book is only half the story – the other half is the ridiculous amount of lore revealed from page to page. Nearly every single image is accompanied by several paragraphs, diving deep into the new illustrations and revealing more about the Multiverse and each of the characters inhabiting its Planes". Rollin Bishop, for ComicBook.com, commented that "historically, VIZ Media has been compiling these hardcover editions based on the various locations and planes present in the game like Dominaria, Ravnica, Innistrad, and so on. Its most recent hardcover art book, however, focuses on the War of the Spark, the recent all-consuming fight between Planeswalkers and Nicol Bolas, one of the most powerful planeswalkers to have ever lived and certainly the most powerful at the time. [...] $40 hardcover art collections aren't exactly a necessary expense, but if you've always been enamored with the game's art, and find yourself wanting to look at large, physical versions of it? Well, VIZ Media's got you covered".

=== Campaign setting book ===
Guildmasters' Guide to Ravnica (2018) was the first Magic: The Gathering campaign setting adapted for Dungeons & Dragons and was released on November 20, 2018. The campaign book and the three related Ravnica card sets carried "the classic collectible card game into its 26th year". Gavin Sheehan, for Bleeding Cool, wrote "overall, Guildmasters' Guide to Ravnica is a fine addition to 5E, but I also recognize this isn't going to be for everyone. [...] DM's and players alike should recognize that there are people who love Dungeons & Dragons to death but have zero interest in Magic: The Gathering. I would recommend this book for people who have played MTG and understand a little bit of what's going on, or players who want to learn more about this world and want to incorporate more of it. It's not impossible to get people with no interest involved, but do prepare yourself for a steeper climb up the hill if you do".

=== Novels ===
War of the Spark: Ravnica (2019) by Greg Weisman was the Magic novel released to correspond with the War of the Spark set; it was published on April 23, 2019. This was the first Magic novel after an eight-year break. The novel debuted at #5 on The New York Times bestseller list in May 2019. The sequel War of the Spark: Forsaken (2019) was released on November 5, 2019.

Alexander Sowa, for CBR, highlighted that "Greg Weissman's War of the Spark: Ravnica [was] infamous among fans for its misrepresentation of existing characters". Sowa commented that its sequel, War of the Spark: Forsaken, "was greeted with a lukewarm response after it infamously attempted to retcon the sexuality of one of the book's protagonists, Chandra. As a result, the game's publisher, Wizards of the Coast, released an official apology for the novel's poor handling of the subject and canceled plans for the book that was intended for the game's next set, Theros: Beyond Death". Reactions to the sequel were "overwhelmingly negative" and it was "lambasted for its disappointing prose, lack of understanding of character voice, and failure to provide any emotional payoff for the relationships that have been set up in the world of Magic. One aspect that has been called out, in particular, is the biphobic language and erasure around the relationship between the Planeswalkers Chandra Nalaar and Nissa Revane". Weisman issued an apology highlighting the "mutual creative/editorial process with WotC and Del Rey" for Chandra's characterization. Wizards of the Coast made a further announcement that they would no longer censor the content in Magic: The Gathering novels to "accommodate foreign content restrictions".

== Reception ==
Charlie Hall, for Polygon, wrote that "Magic: The Gathering's War of the Spark is an attempt by publisher Wizards of the Coast to elevate the storytelling in its marquee franchise". Hall highlighted that every booster pack in this set contains at least one Planeswalker card and commented that "Planeswalkers are clearly much more numerous, and can also appear at just about any rarity, including uncommon. [...] Players who have been keeping up with the last few years worth of new card sets likely have a small stockpile of underutilized Planeswalkers that suddenly look a lot more attractive than they did just a week ago. [...] In keeping with the game's narrative push, there's one Planeswalker that has the most powerful ability of them all. Once Nicol Bolas, Dragon-God comes into the game, he receives the abilities of every other Planeswalker card currently in play. As permissive as War of the Spark is for players looking to try out unusual new strategies, it's also a kind of trap. Everyone will need to contend with the Dragon-God [...]. Overall, I'm terribly impressed with Wizards of the Coast this time around".

Danny Forster, for Dot Esports, wrote: "the War of the Spark expansion is living up to its hype [...]. From instants and sorceries to planeswalkers and God-Eternals, the metagame in MTG Standard will never be the same. With so many options for each archetype, we're seeing a variety of emerging tier-one decks. In addition, previously rated tier-two and three decks are seeing a huge burst towards the top". Forster highlighted that the five dominant Standard decks, from "recent MCQ events, Grand Prix tournaments, MPL Weekly matches, MTG Arena mythic play, and SCG Opens," are Mono-Red Aggro, G/W Explore Proliferate, Bant Midrange, Esper Midrange and Dimir Control.

Ethan Gach, for Kotaku, wrote: "narratively, War Of The Spark couldn't have arrived at a more opportune cultural moment. As the current chapters of the Marvel Cinematic Universe and Game of Thrones come to a close, Magic's latest expansion plays with ideas from both. [...] While other Magic expansions are themed around a particular magical plane of existence, War of the Spark focuses on the confrontation between the Gatewatch and Bolas, and as a result is full of powerful creatures, big spells, and climactic games that tend to go late. This showdown mentality also factors into the two major mechanics at play in the new set. [...] War Of The Spark offers a ton of tools for crafting high-stakes plays, exactly the kind I'm looking for as a chronically lapsed player". Gach also highlighted the play experience of War of the Spark in MTG Arena, commenting that "in addition to keeping track of multiple zombie armies with multiple plus-one counters, there are often lots of planeswalkers to manage in addition to the normal minutiae of creature and land management. Many times while playing over the weekend, I was relieved to be able to rely on the game to automatically be doing my upkeep for me rather than have to keep track of it all by myself, or negotiate mental lapses out loud with someone sitting across from me".

Ash Parrish, also for Kotaku, highlighted Liliana Vess's story development. Parrish wrote, "Liliana is one of those big-time Magic characters. When she does anything, people take notice. In the War of the Spark set, it seemed she finally cast down her bad girl persona for good in favor of stabbing someone in the back who actually deserved it. To make a very long story short, Liliana played a critical role in defeating Nicol Bolas, the big, bad elder-dragon douchebag who wanted to rule over the multiverse with the help of some immensely powerful zombified gods. Our heroes won the day against Bolas largely due to his betrayal by Liliana, who was one of his generals".
