= Strixhaven: A Curriculum of Chaos =

Dungeons & Dragons campaign setting and adventure module

- Rules required: Dungeons & Dragons, 5th edition
- Campaign setting: Multiverse (Magic: The Gathering), Strixhaven
- First published: December 7, 2021

Strixhaven: A Curriculum of Chaos is a sourcebook, published in December 2021, that details the Strixhaven campaign setting for the 5th edition of the Dungeons & Dragons fantasy role-playing game. The plane of Arcavios and its magical university Strixhaven were originally created for the Magic: The Gathering collectible card game and first appeared in the card set Strixhaven: School of Mages, which was released in April of the same year. The book is centered on the most powerful magic university in the multiverse and focuses on the lives of the player characters who attend its various colleges.

== Contents ==
Strixhaven: A Curriculum of Chaos is an adventure module and campaign guide for using the Strixhaven setting, from the collectible card game Magic: The Gathering, in the 5th edition. The book expands on game elements for the 5th edition, such as:

- Four adventures which correspond to each year of university; these adventures can be run as a continuous campaign or as individual one-shots
- Gazetteer focused on the university, its five colleges, and the various non-player characters (NPCs)
- New social mechanics
  - Clubs and student jobs which grant player characters a "student dice" that can be used on ability checks associated with skills related to their extracurricular activities
  - A relationship subsystem involving the NPCs which adds mechanical bonuses or penalties depending on if the NPC becomes a friend or rival
- New player character options
  - Backgrounds, spells and feats connected to Strixhaven's colleges
  - The Owlin character race
- New magic items and a bestiary

=== Colleges ===
Strixhaven's colleges were founded by five Elder Dragons. Each college has a specific mascot which player characters have option of summoning via the find familiar spell.

- Lorehold: a college focused on history with "passionate scholars", "diligent researchers and daring adventurers".
- Witherbloom: a college for "goth bio majors" where students "draw power from the essence of living beings, whether that means enhancing nature or exploiting it"
- Prismari: a college for the theatre kids who use magic to express themselves
- Quandrix: a college focused on math where "they study patterns, fractals, and symmetries to command power over the fundamental forces of nature"
- Silverquill: a college for "literature nerds" where students "wield the magic of words, from inspiring battle poetry to biting arcane insults".

== Publication history ==
Strixhaven: A Curriculum of Chaos is the third Magic: The Gathering campaign setting adapted for Dungeons & Dragons; it was preceded by Guildmasters' Guide to Ravnica (2018) and Mythic Odysseys of Theros (2020). Greg Tito, Dungeons & Dragons Senior Communications Manager, said to IGN that "the D&D guidebooks around Ravnica, and Theros have done amazingly well, and we thought that the Strixhaven storyline would appeal not only to fans of Magic and fans of D&D, but [also a] younger audience. There is a ton of information on how to create a campaign that would appeal to people of all ages... who love that kind of young adult coming-of-age storytelling – and so we thought Strixhaven would be perfect for dramatizing that in a D&D game". Amanda Hamon, Wizards of the Coast senior designer, is the book's story lead. The Guardian reported that Hamon "used teenage life as inspiration" for Strixhaven and that the setting draws in characters from across the multiverse; Hamon said: "As D&D has grown the creators have realised this game is for everybody. There's lots and lots of folks who are playing, and we want everybody to feel that they're welcome and come to the table. I get questions like: 'What is it like now that D&D is more diverse?' But it always has been. You might not necessarily have seen it because the people who were making things didn't always think: 'Hey, there's this whole wide world of folks out there'".

A crossover campaign book Strixhaven: A Curriculum of Chaos was released in December 2021, which introduces the setting to Dungeons & Dragons. The book was originally scheduled for release on November 16, but was delayed due to supply chain issues caused by the COVID-19 pandemic. CBR reported that "in the world of Magic: The Gathering, Strixhaven is the largest and most powerful magic academy in the multiverse [...]. Due to its relatively recent addition to the Magic: The Gathering universe, it's likely this Dungeons & Dragons adventure will significantly expand on the lore associated with the magic school".

The book is also available as a digital product through the following Wizards of the Coast licensees: D&D Beyond, Fantasy Grounds, and Roll20. A promotional, free adventure titled No Tears Over Spilled Coffee! was released on December 2 on D&D Beyond. This one-shot adventure introduces Strixhaven's ruleset for extracurricular activities and is set at the school's Firejolt Café.

== Related products ==
=== Plane Shift series ===
The various planes from Magic: The Gathering were first adapted for Dungeons & Dragons in a series of free PDF releases called Plane Shift by James Wyatt, a "longtime Wizards employee who worked on D&D for over a decade before moving over to Magic in 2014". Wyatt also writes the text for the series of Art of Magic: The Gathering coffee table books, which reprint illustrations from the cards with details for each plane's lore; the Plane Shift releases were created to allow players to use those books as campaign setting guides by providing the necessary rule adaptations. Between 2016 and 2018, six Plane Shift articles were released: Amonkhet, Dominaria, Innistrad, Ixalan, Kaladesh, and Zendikar, along with an Ixalan-set adventure.

However, these articles are not considered official material for organized play. In 2017, Mike Mearls wrote: "It's basically a thing James does for fun, and we don't want to burden it with needing all the work required to make it official". The positive response to the "Plane Shift" articles led to the publication of Guildmasters' Guide to Ravnica (2018), the first full hardcover Dungeons & Dragons guide to the Magic setting, and the success of that sourcebook led to the publication of Mythic Odysseys of Theros (2020).

=== Strixhaven: School of Mages ===
The plane of Arcavios and its magical university Strixhaven were "created from scratch by the world-building team" for the 2021 Strixhaven: School of Mages post-block Magic set expansion. Polygon reported that "on the surface, Magic: The Gathering's new set, Strixhaven: School of Mages, looks like a simple pastiche of Harry Potter's Hogwarts. That's definitely part of its charm. But the intricacies of this new set — and the promise of its accompanying lore — could make it the biggest release of the year. [...] Fledgling mages who apply to Strixhaven must narrow their field of study during their first year of schooling. To represent that, developers have remixed the game's classic multi-color deck combinations" which are represented in the various colleges. Dot Esports highlighted that Wizards of the Coast "made substantial efforts to make the colleges of Strixhaven feel distinct from their Ravnican counterparts. This was accomplished by leaning into the tension between each color pair, leading to conflicts between and within colleges. [...] Within each college are two separate philosophies that students can align with. [...] The team created a magic system that applies specific forms of spellcasting and philosophies to each college".

Ash Parrish, for Kotaku, highlighted that "Strixhaven is a school for mages founded by five powerful dragons, each with their own disciplines and personalities. [...] Strixhaven sounds very much like a real university with math, science, history, and literature departments, each with their unique magical flair. [...] With Strixhaven, I'm really excited to get to know more about the world. It seems like so much fun—a stark contrast to Magic's usual stories of war or surviving in monster-infested environments. Strixhaven seems like it's just kids learning and having a good time, and that's a nice change of pace". Dot Esports also commented that "mage schools are a common fantasy trope and often appear in popular fiction, from Harry Potter to the College of Winterhold in Skyrim. [...] Strixhaven subverted these expectations by creating a world that was all Magic, with little to no references to other popular media".

=== Unearthed Arcana ===
The Unearthed Arcana series is the 5th edition public playtest where the content released is "a near-final draft of the rules"; parts of Strixhaven: A Curriculum of Chaos were developed through this playtest. In Unearthed Arcana: Mages of Strixhaven, new character subclasses were tied to specific Strixhaven Colleges and multiple classes could choose these subclasses. Traditionally, subclasses are tied directly to a single character class. However, there was an overwhelmingly negative response from both fans and playtesters which resulted in these subclasses being cut from the final book. Lead rules designer Jeremy Crawford stated that "the Unearthed Arcana playtest did the job we asked it to do. Occasionally, we put some very experimental things in front of D&D fans and ask them if they want to see more of it. In this case, the very simple answer was 'No'. We learned two really important things from this playtest that reinforced something we've been seeing from the D&D community [...]. People love for D&D subclasses to speak to the distinctiveness of a particular class. 5E fans also want subclasses to be usable in as many settings as possible, since so many DMs homebrew their own settings".

== Reception ==
In Publishers Weekly's "Best-selling Books Week Ending December 17, 2021", Strixhaven: A Curriculum of Chaos was #8 in "Hardcover Nonfiction" and sold 18,298 units. In USA Today's "Best-Selling Books List for December 16, 2021", Strixhaven: A Curriculum of Chaos was #53.

Samantha Nelson, for Polygon, commented that Strixhaven: A Curriculum of Chaos "demonstrates publisher Wizards of the Coast's commitment to inclusiveness and accessibility. Strixhaven's buildings magically shift to accommodate anyone regardless of their size or mobility, and the book contains trans and nonbinary NPCs". Nelson highlighted the strengths and weakness of the various new rulesets and wrote that the sourcebook "isn't a perfect book, but the new subsystems and whimsical adventures provide some really fun material, whether you're running the adventure as written or borrowing elements to slip into a homebrew campaign. Like any college experience, how much you enjoy Strixhaven will really depend on finding the right friends to share it with, and knowing what rules you can ignore in the interest of having a good time". Charlie Hall, in a separate article for Polygon, highlighted the min-maxing potential of the new NPC relationship ruleset. Hall wrote that "all of this is being done in a PG-13 way, mind you, which is the game's de facto age rating, according to our discussions with Wizards of the Coast over the years. In fact, the relationships section goes from introducing the concept right into a discussion on whether or not they're even right for the players at your table. They include tips for Dungeon Masters (DMs) who have some players who aren't really into the idea, and even talks about what to do if someone's BFF begins to hog the spotlight".

The review in Strange Assembly highlighted the new frameworks the sourcebook adds to the game which can be tracked for individual player characters such as "relationships, classes, extracurriculars, and jobs". Their main disappointment is that the sourcebook "ends up not quite being as much of a setting book as I would have liked. In particular, the adventures do not include scenes on all five of the college campuses, so you don't get as much detail as I would have liked. Yes, you do get a general overview and you get information on professors, but because there's no combat/exploration segments for some of the campuses you don't get something like a map of what their main hall looks like". The review highlights that this book requires work on the part of the Dungeon Master and that it can't just be picked up and run. The review states that Dungeon Master needs "to proactively inject social interactions and, to a lesser extent, academic events, into the story. You can maybe get away with not creating fun scenes during class, but you've absolutely got to work in those social interactions (it reminds me of something Powered by the Apocalypse, like the Phoenix Academy setting for Masks). But if you've got that right sort of DM – and the right sort of players – there's a big payoff to be had. For the right D&D group, Strixhaven: A Curriculum of Chaos, will be fabulous".

Christian Hoffer, for ComicBook, also commented that the setting information in this sourcebook is much shorter than the setting sections in the other Magic: The Gathering campaign setting books. Hoffer wrote: "To make up for the lack of locales and plot hooks, the D&D team instead provides a full-length campaign for players to run through, complete with new rules that allow players to benefit from participating in extracurricular activities, jobs, and building relationships with NPC students. [...] The new spells are particularly thematic and provide some nice abilities specific to students of a single college, while the background/feat options allow characters of non-magical classes to participate in a Strixhaven campaign setting. [...] As for the Level 1-to-Level 10 campaign, it sadly feels generic and lackluster. The campaign shies away from the strengths of the Strixhaven campaign setting – the five magical dragons, the bizarre archaics that wander around the outskirts of campus, and the mysterious Oriq organization seeking to destroy Strixhaven from within – for a mundane adventure involving an expelled student looking to get revenge on the school. The most memorable students from the Strixhaven set are also left out, but they are at least replaced with a cast of NPC options that feel more fleshed out than the typical NPC who appears in a Wizards of the Coast D&D adventure". Hoffer highlighted that Strixhaven: A Curriculum of Chaos is a "niche book" that benefits from the magical school story demand.
