= Mythic Odysseys of Theros =

Tabletop role-playing game supplement

- Rules required: Dungeons & Dragons, 5th edition
- Character levels: 1-2
- Campaign setting: Multiverse (Magic: The Gathering), Theros
- Authors: F. Wesley Schneider, James Wyatt, Ari Levitch, Jeremy Crawford, Kate Baker, Bill Benham, Orion D. Black, John Compton, Kelly Digges, James Introcaso, Adam Lee, Ben Petrisor, Jessica Price, Morrigan Robbins, Amber Scott, and Greg A. Vaughan
- First published: June 2, 2020 (digital release), July 21, 2020 (hardcover release)
- Pages: 256
- ISBN: 978-0-7869-6701-8

Mythic Odysseys of Theros is a sourcebook that details the Theros campaign setting for the 5th edition of the Dungeons & Dragons fantasy role-playing game published in June 2020. The plane was originally created for the Magic: The Gathering collectible card game and first appeared in the card set Theros, which was released in September 2013. It is inspired by Greek mythology and has a powerful pantheon of Gods that are present and active in both the world and the lives of the player characters.

== Contents ==
Mythic Odysseys of Theros is a 256-page campaign and adventure guide for using the Theros setting, from the collectible card game Magic: The Gathering, in the 5th edition. The book expands on game elements for the 5th edition, such as:

- Two new races — satyr and Leonin (a feline race from Magic: the Gathering)
- Three reprinted races — centaur, minotaur (from Guildmasters' Guide to Ravnica), and Triton (an updated version from Volo’s Guide to Monsters)
- Two subclass options — the College of Eloquence Bard and the Oath of Glory Paladin
- New mechanics — an expanded Piety system (from the Dungeon Master's Guide), an omen chart, and a new supernatural gift ability that is chosen during character creation
- An expanded bestiary that includes new Mythic level monsters
- Theros themed magic items and artifacts

== Publication history ==
Starting in 2016, James Wyatt, a "longtime Wizards employee who worked on D&D for over a decade before moving over to Magic in 2014", began to write a series of free PDF releases called Plane Shift where various Magic: The Gathering planes were adapted for Dungeons & Dragons. The positive response to the "Plane Shift" articles lead to the publication of Guildmasters' Guide to Ravnica (2018), the first full hardcover Dungeons & Dragons guide to the Magic setting, and the success of that sourcebook lead to the publication of Mythic Odysseys of Theros. Wyatt and F. Wesley Schneider were the lead designers on the book.

The new sourcebook was announced on March 2, 2020 after being leaked through an Amazon product listing. While the book was originally scheduled for release on June 2, 2020, printing delays due to the COVID-19 pandemic meant that the hardcover release was delayed to July 21, 2020. An alternate art cover of the book was released as a local game store exclusive. The book is also available as a digital product through the following Wizards of the Coast licensees: D&D Beyond, Fantasy Grounds, and Roll20.

When asked in an interview on what elements from the card game were carried over and what elements were cut during development, Wyatt said, "I think the process was more additive than anything else, we took the world guides that were created for Theros for the card sets and expanded those to flesh it out. I think of Magic worldbuilding like building a movie set. The old fashioned stereotype of the movie set where you walk down the streets of the town in the western and it's just a facade and there are no actual buildings behind them. The Magic team is very good at creating the illusion that there is a world beyond those walls, but D&D players need to be able to go there, in ways that the card set doesn't. So, we did a lot of fleshing out".

== Related products ==
=== Plane Shift Series ===
The various planes from Magic: The Gathering were first adapted for Dungeons & Dragons in a series of free PDF releases called Plane Shift by James Wyatt. Wyatt also writes the text for the series of Art of Magic: The Gathering coffee table books, which reprint illustrations from the cards with details for each plane's lore; the Plane Shift releases were created to allow players to use those books as campaign setting guides by providing the necessary rule adaptations. Between 2016 and 2018, six Plane Shift articles were released: Amonkhet, Dominaria, Innistrad, Ixalan, Kaladesh, and Zendikar, along with an Ixalan-set adventure.

However, these articles are not considered official material for organized play. In 2017, Mike Mearls wrote: "It's basically a thing James does for fun, and we don't want to burden it with needing all the work required to make it official".

=== Theros Beyond Death ===
Theros Beyond Death was a Magic: The Gathering post-block set expansion released in January 2020. In February 2020, Screen Rant reported that "As popular as the setting has been thanks to its Greek influences, the most recent set has experienced some controversy. Following the poor handling of the novel that accompanied the previous set War of the Spark, the story material for Theros Beyond Death was delayed indefinitely; no novel was released, and story updates were never posted on Magic's website. This has disappointed fans greatly, as some very popular characters appeared in Theros Beyond Death and players bemoaned missing the chance to learn more about them. The official statement from Wizards is that it is waiting for the proper time and channel to release the story materials. A return to prominence for the setting in the form of a Dungeons & Dragons book could be just the opportunity they're waiting for".

=== Icons of the Realm ===
WizKids released a set of 45 Mythic Odysseys of Theros themed Dungeons & Dragons miniatures as part of their Icons of the Realm blind box line.

== Reception ==
In Publishers Weekly's "Best-selling Books Week Ending July 25, 2020", Mythic Odysseys of Theros was #7 in "Hardcover Nonfiction", and sold 14,028 units.

Gavin Sheehan, for Bleeding Cool, reported that the timing of book's publication, between Critical Role's sourcebook and the COVID-19 pandemic, meant that Mythic Odysseys Of Theros "got passed over in a lot of eyes" especially since by the time of the D&D Live 2020 event the focus had shifted to the new adventure book Icewind Dale: Rime Of The Frostmaiden. Sheehan wrote that while the book is a good sourcebook it also "feels like a throwaway book made simply to rehook MTG players after Ravnica". Sheehan highlighted that the book has similar flaws as the Magic card set it is based on and that "there's an argument that you can miss entire sets of the TCG and not play the game for years, come back, and pick up right where you left off with the caveat of having to learn a few things that changed while you were away. And part of that theory is that some of the sets are just straight up forgettable and don't play into any major storyline or development of the game as a whole. And Theros is one of those sets as it came, did its thing for a year, and barely left a mark on the series. It makes for interesting storytelling, but it fails to seize on a lot of the things that make MTG popular, which shows up in this book as well".

Riley Silverman, for Nerdist, highlighted that the setting of the sourcebook "is entirely self-contained within the gaming system. You don’t need to know the card block or even any Greek mythology to play it". Silverman wrote that "Theros is a setting for players looking for a little more Clash of the Titans instead of Lord of the Rings. [...] One of the biggest departures from other D&D games is just how active a role gods play within Theros. [...] I particularly love the way the book incorporates the flavor of the gods themselves in their individual chapters, including examples of myths the folk of Theros might have about them. [...] If you’ve got the time to invest and a group willing to look over a new setting, Theros offers a unique D&D experience that allows for a break from the type of story without having to learn another gaming system, and it’s a vibrant and exciting setting that is definitely worth a look".

Simon Yule, for GeekDad, wrote "Fans of Magic The Gathering will recognize this new setting, as Mythic Odysseys of Theros comes straight from WotC’s other main product line. And, like the accidental second child of an already stretched and loveless marriage, D&D fans will have to put up with some of Magic‘s oversized hand-me-downs. But don’t worry: those slightly worn-out jeans and unwanted, stained Converse All-Stars can find a new lease of life as second hand treasure". Yule highlighted that the sourcebook includes 50 pages of new monsters including new Mythic level monsters that add "a brand new mechanic to help DMs keep their players guessing. Each of these creatures has Mythic Traits and Actions which the Dungeon Master can use to ramp up the difficulty and really hammer home the sense of a truly terrifying and world-ending threat". Yule also highlighted that the sourcebook adds new player races and reprints some races, however, "in Theros they have their own unique traits, abilities, and characteristics that distinguish them from their Forgotten Realms counterparts".
