= Ravnica Allegiance =

Magic: The Gathering expansion set

- Released: January 25, 2019
- Expansion code: RNA
← Guilds of Ravnica	War of the Spark →

Ravnica Allegiance is the 80th Magic: The Gathering expansion; while it is not part of a block, this set is functionally the second part of a Ravnica focused storyline set on the plane of Ravnica. It was released on January 25, 2019.

== Setting ==
The Guilds of Ravnica and Ravnica Allegiance sets each focus on five out of the ten Ravnica guilds and the shared storyline creates the foundation for the story in the War of the Spark set. On this story design, Mark Rosewater highlighted that they wanted the Bolas Arc to "end with a big dramatic event" which required getting players to care that this event was occurring on Ravnica. Rosewater wrote that "once we knew that the year was two normal guild sets followed by an event set, the Creative team was able to start working on the fine details of the story. The first two sets would take place mostly while the events of Ixalan and Dominaria were going on, which meant the Gatewatch would be busy elsewhere. These two sets were going to be about Nicol Bolas trying to slowly influence the world of Ravnica and warp it to his needs. We would focus on the guilds as they internally fought between the forces pulling them toward or away from Bolas's influence. [...] The Creative team then split the guilds in half. Five would fall under Bolas's influence, and five would not. [...] The five guilds that fell to Bolas would each have a planeswalker, beholden to Bolas, who would lead the guild".

=== Guilds ===
This set focuses on the following Ravnica guilds:

- The Azorius Senate is "the law and government of Ravnica in a very similar way to real-world governments, in the form of three columns". The guild "has a reputation for bureaucratic sluggishness, but its beat cops are the best of the best".
- Cult of Rakdos was founded by the "megalomaniac" demon lord Rakdos and members of this guild focus and revel in "the pleasure and carnage of the here and now".
- The Gruul Clans are a collection of independent, feuding groups that live in the "small pockets of wilderness" left on Ravnica and wish to restore the natural way by returning Ravnica to a more primitive time.
- The Simic Combine is a guild of "scientists and biomancers" who value and revere "the sheer power of nature, but they believe that natural evolution is slow and difficult to control, so they augment it with blue mana to guide and accelerate the natural way".
- The Orzhov Syndicate, also known as The Church of Deals, acts as both "the central religion and the central bank". The guild is equal parts church and crime family whose members "rule what may be the most neatly organized meanest guild of all".

== Mechanics ==
Each guild receives a unique mechanic in this set:

- Azorius (white-blue): the new Addendum mechanic "allows you to gain additional effects on spells if you cast them in your main phase".
- Rakdos (black-red): the new Spectacle mechanic "allows you to pay a different cost for your spells if your opponent has lost life the same turn. By paying this different cost you will gain new and/or different effects".
- Gruul (red-green): the new Riot mechanic "provides some flexibility in how you want to topple your opponents. As a creature with Riot enters the battlefield it can either have +1/+1 counter or Haste".
- Simic (green-blue): the new Adapt mechanic "allows you to pay a activated cost to put a number of +1/+1 counters on the associated creature if it has none already".
- Orzhov (white-black): the new Afterlife mechanic "triggers once the creature dies and creates a 1/1 Spirit creature token. The higher the number after the Afterlife keyword [...] dictates how many tokens are created. Souls bound forever to do the bidding of the Syndicate".

In an interview, Rosewater said "one of the coolest things about designing guild mechanics is that you get to make something specifically for the player that enjoys the kind of deck that guild plays. For example, Orzhov is about grinding out incremental advantage as it slowly 'bleeds' the opponent out and Afterlife is a good mechanic to help do that as the creatures die and become tiny flying Spirits that continue to plink away at your opponent. Rakdos, in contrast, plays a more aggressive game where it spits out hordes of creatures. Its mechanic, Spectacle, helps you play additional creatures, but requires you staying aggressive".

== Related products ==
=== Guildmasters' Guide to Ravnica ===
Guildmasters' Guide to Ravnica (2018) was the first Magic: The Gathering campaign setting adapted for Dungeons & Dragons and was released on November 20, 2018. The campaign book and the three related Ravnica card sets carried "the classic collectible card game into its 26th year". Gavin Sheehan, for Bleeding Cool, wrote "overall, Guildmasters' Guide to Ravnica is a fine addition to 5E, but I also recognize this isn't going to be for everyone. [...] DM's and players alike should recognize that there are people who love Dungeons & Dragons to death but have zero interest in Magic: The Gathering. I would recommend this book for people who have played MTG and understand a little bit of what's going on, or players who want to learn more about this world and want to incorporate more of it. It's not impossible to get people with no interest involved, but do prepare yourself for a steeper climb up the hill if you do".

== Reception ==
Chris Carter, for Destructoid, highlighted that "Allegiance has some pretty wild cards and completes the Shockland mana base for every deck combination. [...] Everything in this set (and the previous set, Guilds of Ravnica) will remain standard in Arena and in the paper format throughout the fourth quarter of 2020. The current sets of Ixalan, Rivals of Ixalan, Dominaria and Core 2019 are cycling out later this year. [...] If you haven't played a sealed game of Magic before, you might want to give it a shot. The gist is that gaming stores around the country will run limited events where players are given six booster packs and are tasked with creating a deck. You can swap out whatever cards you want between rounds but your job is win as many games as possible. [...] As always there is the option to crack open booster packs (or boxes of 36 packs) and try your luck when cards go on sale. Some people dig the thrill of cracking. Alternatively, you can also buy singles and build the decks you want".

Cameron Kunzelman, for Paste, commented that this set "is the best impulses of Magic humming along on all cylinders. [...] From my experience playing a few drafts and a couple sealed tournaments on Magic Arena, this makes for one of the better Limited formats simply because there's a bit of time for players to think. Your decisions matter, the decks don't build themselves, and you really have to consider your attacks, blocks and use of supporting spells. [...] If you've been out of the Magic game for a while, Ravnica Allegiance [sic] is a great place to jump back in simply because it demonstrates some of the core strengths of Magic design. [...] As for how this set will impact the broader experience of Magic, including Standard and Modern formats, I cannot say. [...] If I have a choice between a set having an interesting Limited environment and cards that make for a crunchy, highly competitive Constructed format, I'm going to go for the former. All in all, Ravnica Allegiance establishes the core expectations for Magic sets for the next couple years. It isn't raising the bar; it's creating the new bar".

Princess Weekes, for The Mary Sue, highlighted her favorite cards from the set with her top three being Mirror March, Captive Audience and Rhythm of the Wild. Weekes included the caveat: "I am very much a newbie and a casual player who mostly enjoys Commander and Modern, so I'm not coming in here as some master authority. There are lots of awesome Magic YouTube channels that have broken down the best cards in the set through years of experience as players. For me, as a baby Magic user who enjoys playing and just wants to have a good time with creatures who do cool things and crafting themed decks, here are the eight cards that really spoke to me as I was enjoying the set".
