= Guilds of Ravnica =

Magic: The Gathering expansion set

- Released: October 5, 2018
- Expansion code: GRN
← Dominaria	Ravnica Allegiance →

Guilds of Ravnica is the 79th Magic: The Gathering expansion; while it is not part of a block, this set is functionally the first part of a Ravnica focused storyline set on the plane of Ravnica. It was released on October 5, 2018.

== Setting ==
The Guilds of Ravnica and Ravnica Allegiance sets each focus on five out of the ten Ravnica guilds and the shared storyline creates the foundation for the story in the War of the Spark set. On this story design, Mark Rosewater highlighted that they wanted the Bolas Arc to "end with a big dramatic event" which required getting players to care that this event was occurring on Ravnica. Rosewater wrote that "once we knew that the year was two normal guild sets followed by an event set, the Creative team was able to start working on the fine details of the story. The first two sets would take place mostly while the events of Ixalan and Dominaria were going on, which meant the Gatewatch would be busy elsewhere. These two sets were going to be about Nicol Bolas trying to slowly influence the world of Ravnica and warp it to his needs. We would focus on the guilds as they internally fought between the forces pulling them toward or away from Bolas's influence. [...] The Creative team then split the guilds in half. Five would fall under Bolas's influence, and five would not. [...] The five guilds that fell to Bolas would each have a planeswalker, beholden to Bolas, who would lead the guild".

=== Guilds ===
This set focuses on the following Ravnica guilds:

- The Selesnya Conclave is a religious institution that preaches "harmony between nature and civilization and from that balance, peace will come", however, "these Conclave mages are no pacifists. They can fight on par with the other nine guilds, and they always fight as one".
- The Boros Legion serve as Ravnica's military, break up fights between the guilds and are generally aggressive.
- The Golgari Swarm believe that "death, and sometimes undeath, is a natural and crucial part of nature’s cycle. Consequently, many of their ranks practice necromancy" and the guild manages the life-death cycle for the city since "dead matter supplies nutrients to the living".
- The Izzet League is "a collection of mad scientists, wizards and drakes that are seek to push magical science to the limits, and then break those limits with glee".
- House Dimir is a guild of shadows, lies and deception and is formed by "a complex and secretive network of spies, informants, assassins, and agents that all work to infiltrate other guilds and gather information of all levels regardless of importance".

== Mechanics ==
Each guild receives a unique mechanic in this set:

- Selesnya (green-white): the Convoke mechanic, returning from the original Ravnica: City of Guilds set, "rewards token generation and communicates Selesnya’s ethos of strength through unity".
- Boros (red-white): the Mentor mechanic is a new mechanic that encourages attacking.
- Golgari (black-green): the Undergrowth mechanic "is used to highlight abilities that care in some way about the number of creature cards in your graveyard", however, it is different on each card. This ability also provides "scaling effects".
- Izzet (blue-red): the Jump-start mechanic, which is similar to the Flashback mechanic, is used to cast a card "from your graveyard by paying all its regular costs and one additional cost: discarding a card from your hand".
- Dimir (blue-black): the Surveil mechanic, which is similar to the Scry mechanic, "gives you a look into—and some control over—the future of your draws".

== Related products ==
=== Guildmasters' Guide to Ravnica ===
Guildmasters' Guide to Ravnica (2018) was the first Magic: The Gathering campaign setting adapted for Dungeons & Dragons and was released on November 20, 2018. The campaign book and the three related Ravnica card sets carried "the classic collectible card game into its 26th year". Gavin Sheehan, for Bleeding Cool, wrote "overall, Guildmasters' Guide to Ravnica is a fine addition to 5E, but I also recognize this isn't going to be for everyone. [...] DM's and players alike should recognize that there are people who love Dungeons & Dragons to death but have zero interest in Magic: The Gathering. I would recommend this book for people who have played MTG and understand a little bit of what's going on, or players who want to learn more about this world and want to incorporate more of it. It's not impossible to get people with no interest involved, but do prepare yourself for a steeper climb up the hill if you do".

== Reception ==
Cameron Kunzelman, for Paste, highlighted that the guilds in Ravnica are defined by a color pair with matching lore. Kunzelman wrote, "any card set that takes place in Ravnica is fundamentally going to be built around these assumptions about mana and card creation at the core of Magic, and in my experience that means that Guilds of Ravnica is a more complicated set than normal. One needs to understand not just what the cards are doing, but to excel, one also needs to understand what these particular guilds (and their colors) are trying to accomplish at the design level. [...] Experienced players tend to love sets on Ravnica, and I’m one of them. [...] But it also requires the player to build very particular decks, and so this is not the kind of set that you should try to teach a friend how to play with. [...] Overall, I’ve enjoyed the cards I’ve played with in Guilds of Ravnica, and it is going to be interesting how the broader game of Magic changes in response to it. But I don’t think Guilds is going to usher in a bunch of new players who are excited about the hypercomplexity of the game".

Alexander Lu, for Comics Beat, reviewed a Booster Bundle for the Guilds of Ravnica set which included items such as ten booster packs, poster art that "features the 'Guilds of Ravnica' key art of a floating city shaped like Magic‘s trademark planeswalker symbol", "insert cards that lay out the game in its most basic terms, and 80 basic land cards". Lu highlighted that "thirteen years after the first Ravnica block of sets (and six years after the second), Magic has finally returned to Ravnica once more. [...] While perhaps not as explanatory of the rules as a Starter Set, Bundles offered a variety of gameplay tools beyond just cards– making them valuable for someone who needed things like deckboxes and dice. [...] [The] player guide contains a visual checklist of every card in the expansion, easily allowing you to keep track of your collection. It also contains some information about the story in of this set, which focuses on a mysterious conspiracy that has begun to sow discord among the guilds of Ravnica. [...] That said, even though we didn’t pull a mythic, all in all, this Magic 'Guilds of Ravnica' bundle has had some incredible cards inside. I’m so psyched to have a chance to play with these cards and many others from this set".

Carl Yaxley, for the UK game store ZAKU, rated the set as 85% and commented: "I've long been a fan of sets based on Ravnica. As a thematic setting, I find it quite appealing, enjoying the stories and world building that wrap around the game. I also enjoy deck building in Ravnican guild colours, with the guild themes in mind. That said, it will be unsurprising to learn that I really enjoyed the Guilds of Ravnica expansion! The guild abilities and card synergies make this a fun expansion to draft in isolation, and to deck build with. However, a note to new and casual players. You may benefit from picking up Core Set products first, as those sets will give you more versatile cards and support a wider range of deck archetypes".
