= List of fictional schools =

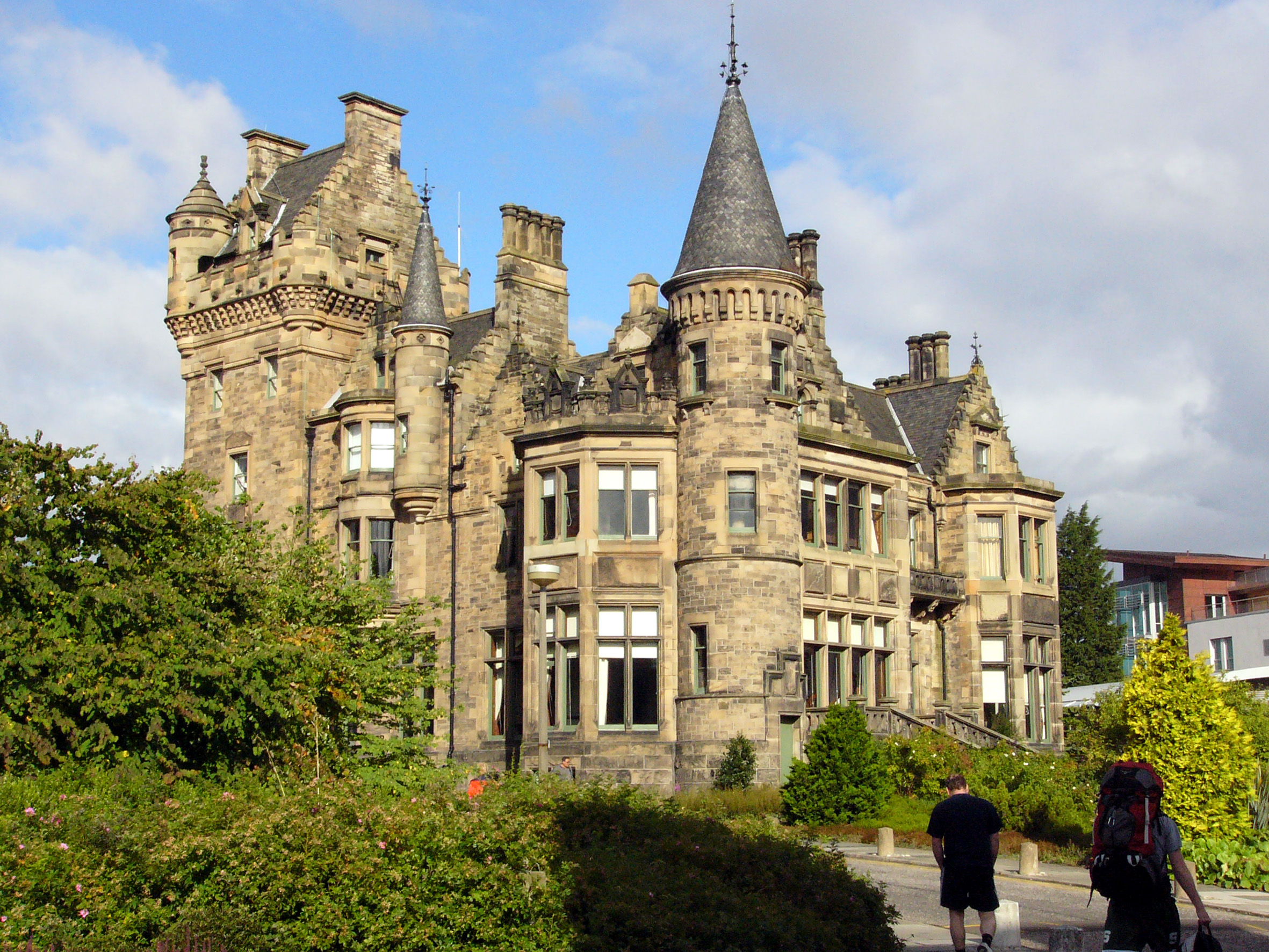
St Trinnean's Academy for Young Ladies was one of the real-life inspirations for the fictional girls' school of St Trinian's

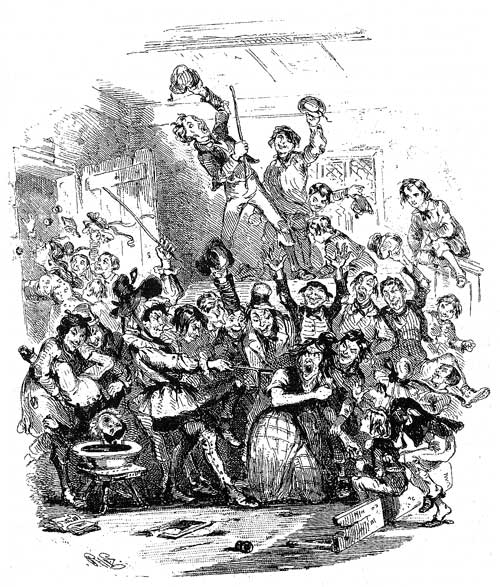
The squalid Dotheboys Hall in Dickens' Nicholas Nickleby was inspired by a real school in Bowes.

This is a list of fictional schools as portrayed in various media.

== Literature ==
- Camden College
- Chalet School, in books by Elinor Brent-Dyer
- Greyfriars School, in books by Charles Hamilton writing as Frank Richards
- Jade Mountain Academy, featured in Tui T. Sutherland's Wings of Fire series
- The Little Female Academy, in Sarah Fielding's 1754 book.
- Lowood Institution, in Jane Eyre by Charlotte Brontë
- Malory Towers, in books by Enid Blyton
- Miskatonic University, in stories by H. P. Lovecraft
- St Trinian's School, in comic books by Ronald Searle and later films
- Redmond College, in Lucy Maud Montgomery's series of works related to Anne of Green Gables

== Television ==
- Ackley Bridge College in Channel 4's television drama series, Ackley Bridge, set in the fictional Yorkshire mill town of Ackley Bridge
- Grange Hill School in BBC's television drama series, Grange Hill, set in the fictional North London borough of Northam
- Starfleet Academy, located in San Francisco, California in the fictional Star Trek universe.

== Magic schools ==
A magic school/academy/university is an institution for learning magic, appearing in works of fantasy depicting worlds in which magic exists and in which there is an organized society of magicians or wizards who pass on their knowledge systematically.

=== Folklore ===
- The Black School, where the Icelandic priest and scholar Sæmundr fróði supposedly learned magic from the Devil
- Domdaniel
- The Cave at Salamanca where the Devil supposedly taught, among others, Pope Sylvester II
- The Scholomance, a legendary school of black magic in Transylvania

=== In a series ===
Dungeons and Dragons

- Morgrave University in Sharn from the Eberron campaign setting
- Soltryce Academy in Rexxentrum, the capital of the Dwendalian Empire, from the Wildemount campaign setting; premiered in Critical Role's second campaign
- Strixhaven, a magical university located in the plane of Arcavios from the Magic: The Gathering multiverse

Harry Potter series

- Hogwarts School of Witchcraft and Wizardry in Scotland
- Beauxbatons Academy of Magic in France
- Durmstrang Institute for Magical Learning between the border of Norway and Sweden
- Ilvermorny School of Witchcraft and Wizardry in North America
- Uagadou in Uganda
- Mahoutokoro in Japan
- Castelobruxo (pronounced cah-stelo-bru-sho) in the Amazon rainforest in Brazil

=== Others ===
- Balamb Garden, a magic school featured in Final Fantasy VIII. Other "gardens" in this game include Galbadia Garden and Trabia Garden.
- University of Salamanca Faculty of Magic in The Charwoman's Shadow by Lord Dunsany
- Meng School in the Taiwanese TV series
- Unseen University from the Discworld series by Terry Pratchett
- The Royal Academy, a magic school for noble children in Ascendance of a Bookworm, a Japanese light novel series by Miya Kazuki.

== Superhero schools ==
- U.A. High School, a superhero school featured in My Hero Academia franchise.
- X-Mansion, a superhero school featured in X-Men franchise.
- Superhero Kindergarten, a superhero school created by Stan Lee and starring Arnold Schwarzenegger.
- Sky High, a superhero school created by Bob Schooley and Mark McCorkle.

== Sources ==
- Alexander H. Pitofsky (2014), American Boarding School Fiction, 1928-1981, McFarland, ISBN 9780786478651
- Nancy G. Rosoff; Stephanie Spencer (2019), British and American School Stories, 1910–1960, Springer, ISBN 9783030059866
- Jeffrey Richards (1988), Happiest Days: The Public Schools in English Fiction, Manchester University Press, ISBN 9780719027758
- Silke Braselmann (2019), The Fictional Dimension of the School Shooting Discourse, Walter de Gruyter GmbH, ISBN 9783110649017
- Jo Keroes (1999), Tales Out of School, SIU Press, ISBN 9780809322381
- L. Spolton (1963), "The Secondary School in Post-war Fiction", British Journal of Educational Studies, 11 (2): 125–141, doi:10.1080/00071005.1963.9973093
