= Throne of Eldraine =

Magic: The Gathering expansion set

- The set's expansion symbol depicts a crown, a sword and a knight's tabard.
- Released: October 4, 2019
- Size: 269 cards
- Development code: Archery
- Expansion code: ELD
← War of the Spark	Theros Beyond Death →

Throne of Eldraine is a standalone Magic: The Gathering expansion set that was released on October 4, 2019. The set's expansion code is ELD and its development codename was "Archery". MTG Arena officially launched with Throne of Eldraine.

== Themes ==
=== Fairy tales ===
Throne of Eldraine is inspired by fairy tales from King Arthur's Camelot and the European Grimms' Fairy Tales. Previously Magic "had Faerie-focused sets [...] in the Lorwyn block, which saw various fairy tale-inspired tribes of creatures move to the fore while also introducing Planeswalkers as a concept for competitive play".

On the design, Mark Rosewater said, "One of the cool things about fairy tales and Arthurian tales is that they have a lot of themes that run through multiple stories. [...] Fairy tales and Arthurian tales run the gamut of storytelling and easily provided material for all five colors".

=== Planeswalkers ===
It is revealed in this storyline that the Planeswalker twins Rowan and Will Kenrith (introduced in the 2018 Battlebond set) are from the Eldraine plane. The Planeswalker Garruk also returns in this storyline. Jamie Lovett, for ComicBook.com, highlighted that Garruk was introduced in the Lorwyn block but "was notably absent from War of the Spark, a set that included more planeswalkers than any before. [...] In the [Throne of Eldraine] set, Garruk seems to take on the role of the huntsman from tales like Snow White and Red Riding Hood".

This set also introduced a new Planeswalker, the Fey shapeshifter Oko. Scott Gardner, for GameRant, wrote "in keeping with all the cautionary tales the Grimms were known for, Oko looks to fit into this world well with deceit, conceit, and an all-around sneaky personality. [...] Oko originated on a plane where the Fey were deemed as a menace to be suppressed. [...] Oko travels about playing cruel pranks on anyone and anything he feels is hypocritical, even other planeswalkers". Oko's card was banned from the Standard and Brawl formats in November 2019.

== Mechanics ==
Throne of Eldraine introduced a new keyword called Adamant. Spells with Adamant have bonuses if you spend at least three mana of a particular color to cast them.

== Reception ==
Jamie Lovett, for ComicBook.com, reviewed the Throne of Eldraine set for MTG Arena after playing it in a preview event. Lovett wrote, "I wish I’d had more time to experiment and play in the preview event (it was a busy day), but what I did play was a lot of fun. Throne of Eldraine has powerful new cards, interesting new mechanics, and shakes up the meta just enough to be interesting without throwing every fun archetype that already existed out the window. I’m looking forward to the set launching on Magic: The Gathering Arena this week, and I think other Magic players should be looking forward to it as well".

Joshua Nelson, for Bleeding Cool, reviewed a Throne of Eldraine booster box, a Throne of Eldraine Bundle, and the two Planeswalker decks. On the Planeswalker decks (Oko, the Trickster, and Rowan, Fearless Sparkmage), Nelson wrote, "I've so far played one game with these decks straight out of the box, and while it's clear that a bit more tuning up could have been good for the Rowan deck (in contrast the Oko deck could have been tuned down, but where's the mirth in that?), the two decks played together quite well. [...] In playing with both decks together I found that the sooner a player got out their Planeswalker, the better – this actually lends itself very well to modifying these decks into Oathbreaker decks [...]. All in all, the Magic: The Gathering Planeswalker Decks are quite good, and more importantly tons of fun to play with". Nelson also commented that "the only gripe I have about the Throne of Eldraine Bundle is that (as with the Planeswalker Decks' booster packs) the packs are significantly harder to open than the packs within the booster box".

Carl Yaxley, for the UK game store ZAKU, rated the set as 92% and highlighted that, "The artwork in this set stands out from other recent expansions, largely due to the Showcase card variants. [...] The overall result is a good looking, thematic mash-up reminiscent of the Lorwyn and Shadowmoor expansions. [...] When this set was first teased I had mixed feelings. I liked the lean in towards Knight tribal. However, I thought the fairytale theme might be too childish (Shrek came to mind). On balance, I think the theme has the right tone".

Derek Gallen, for Hipsters of the Coast, commented that "Throne of Eldraine looks excellent for cube owners. It’s full of new and unique cards; many of them are strong enough to be meaningful—without being too dominant—inclusions for every power level, or environment".

Joshua Nelson, in a separate article for Bleeding Cool, also highlighted that players and store owners complained that the Throne of Eldraine Collector's Edition packs were mappable. Nelson wrote, "for those uninitiated to this phenomenon, 'mapping' a booster box is a trial-and-error process where packs are opened in order to locate where a specific card is in a box. From data extrapolated from numerous sources of opened boxes, a conclusion can or cannot be reached as to where a card can be on a near-definitive level. [...] The main concern here is that the cards themselves in these packs are cut in a way that denotes that they are oversized and slightly misshaped. [...] Still, the set is good and the Collector's Edition cards are obtainable in other places where the print run isn't totally skewed and the packs are cut properly, so in the end, we can all keep on playing Magic: The Gathering without worrying about these issues".
