= Ravnica (Magic: The Gathering) =

Setting for Magic: The Gathering sets

Ravnica: City of Guilds
- tower
- Released: October 7, 2005
- Size: 306 (88 rares, 88 uncommons, 110 commons, 20 lands)
- Keywords: Convoke, Transmute, Dredge, Radiance
- Mechanics: Guild system, hybrid mana
- Designers: Mark Rosewater (lead), Tyler Bielman, Mike Elliott, Aaron Forsythe, and Richard Garfield
- Developers: Brian Schneider (lead), Aaron Forsythe, Mark L. Gottlieb, Matt Place, Paul Sottosanti, and Henry Stern
- Development code: Control
- Expansion code: RAV

First set in the Ravnica block
Ravnica	Guildpact	Dissension
← Ninth Edition	Guildpact →
← Kamigawa Block	Time Spiral Block →

Guildpact
- seal of the Guildpact
- Released: February 3, 2006
- Size: 165 (55 rares, 55 uncommons, 55 commons)
- Keywords: Haunt, Bloodthirst, Replicate
- Mechanics: Color alliances
- Designers: Mike Elliott (lead), Aaron Forsythe, Devin Low, Brian Schneider
- Developers: Henry Stern (lead), Aaron Forsythe, Cormac Russell, Brian Schneider, and Mike Turian
- Development code: Alt
- Expansion code: GPT

Second set in the Ravnica block
Ravnica	Guildpact	Dissension
← Ravnica	Dissension →
← Kamigawa Block	Time Spiral Block →

Dissension
- broken seal of the Guildpact
- Released: May 5, 2006
- Size: 180 (60 rares, 60 uncommons, 60 commons)
- Keywords: Graft, Hellbent, Forecast
- Mechanics: Multicolored cards, Hybrid cards, Split cards
- Designers: Aaron Forsythe (lead), Brandon Bozzi, Mark L. Gottlieb, and Mark Rosewater
- Developers: Matt Place (lead), Mark Rosewater, Brian Schneider, and Steve Warner
- Development code: Delete
- Expansion code: DIS

Third set in the Ravnica block
Ravnica	Guildpact	Dissension
← Guildpact	Coldsnap →
← Kamigawa Block	Time Spiral Block →

Ravnica is a Magic: The Gathering block that consists of three expert-level expansion sets: Ravnica: City of Guilds (October 7, 2005), Guildpact (February 3, 2006), and Dissension (May 5, 2006). Following in the tradition of other Magic blocks, Ravnica takes place in a plane of the multiverse that was previously unexplored in the game's backstory. The world of Ravnica is an ecumenopolis, a vast city that covers the entire surface of its planet, and is home to a diverse assortment of sentient races. Much power in Ravnica is held by the ten "guilds", political factions that each represent a combination of two of Magic's five colors. The mythology of Ravnica is loosely derived from Slavic folklore, and the character names reflect this. This plane was revisited in the Return to Ravnica block, and the Guilds of Ravnica, Ravnica Allegiance, War of the Spark, and Murders at Karlov Manor sets.

== Design ==
Ravnica was conceived following the success of Invasion. Invasion, released in 2000, emphasized interactions between the colors, and it was one of Magic's most popular releases. Magic's lead designer, Mark Rosewater, wanted to expand on the multicolor theme in a new way. Therefore, the design of Ravnica is based around ten two-color pairs, including cards in which those pairs of colors work in concert.

The Ravnica cycle is functionally different from the Invasion cycle due to how the multicolored or multicolor-themed cards are distributed among the three sets that make up each cycle. In the Invasion cycle, for example, the first two sets (Invasion and Planeshift) centered around friendly color pairs; in each of the five featured combinations of three colors (Nightscape/Crosis, Stormscape/Dromar, Sunscape/Treva, Thornscape/Rith, and Thunderscape/Darigaaz), two of them would be enemies of each other but both would be allies of a third central color (example: in a card like Ancient Spring that focuses on the white/blue/black combination, white and black are enemies of each other but both are allies of blue). The last set, Apocalypse, emphasized enemy color pairs; in each of the five featured combinations of three colors ("Ana", "Ceta", "Dega", "Necra", and "Raka"), two of them would be allies of each other but both would be enemies of the third (example: for Urborg Elf, blue and black are allies of each other but enemies of green). However, the color combinations that are featured in each set of the Ravnica cycle are determined by which guilds are important in that stage of the story. All the multicolor cards in the Ravnica cycle (and many other cards) are associated with one of the ten guilds. Ravnica emphasized Boros, Dimir, Golgari, and Selesnya; Guildpact emphasized Gruul, Izzet, and Orzhov; and Dissension emphasized Azorius, Rakdos, and Simic.

== Mechanics ==
Ravnica introduces hybrid mana. Each symbol is a circle halved diagonally, in which the top left half is one color and the bottom right half another. A smaller version of the color's icon (sun for white, skull for black, etc.) appears in the corresponding half. These mana symbols mean that mana of either color may be used to pay it; for example, a spell whose mana cost is two green/white hybrid mana may be played using two green mana, two white mana, or one green and one white. The cards with these mana symbols have a colored border that fades from left to right, out of one color and into the other; and are counted as both colors.

Each of the ten guilds has a new keyword or ability word associated with it.

- Radiance (red/white, Boros): Radiance is an ability word that appears on spells and abilities that affect every permanent that shares a color with the target permanent (usually of the same type). When played on multi-colored cards, the effect spreads to all that card's colors.
- Convoke (green/white, Selesnya): A player playing a spell with Convoke may tap some of their creatures to pay part or all of the card's mana cost. Each creature tapped reduces the cost by one mana of that creature's color, or by one colorless mana.
- Dredge (black/green, Golgari): Cards with dredge may be returned from the graveyard to their owner's hand, provided that player opts to skip drawing a card and instead puts a number of cards from the top of their library into the graveyard. For example, for a card with "Dredge 3", you can skip your draw and put three cards from the top of your deck to the graveyard to add the card to your hand.
- Transmute (blue/black, Dimir): A player may pay three mana of certain colors and discard a card with Transmute from their hand. Doing this allows the player to find a card with the same converted mana cost from that player's library, reveal it, and put it into their hand. For example, Brainspoil, has converted mana cost 5 with Transmute for 1 colorless and 2 black mana, and if you choose to transmute it, you pay the mana cost and discard it, then search your library for anything converted mana cost 5, reveal it, and put it into your hand. You can only Transmute as a sorcery.
- Haunt (white/black, Orzhov): When a creature or spell with Haunt is put into a graveyard, it is removed from the game haunting a creature in play. When the haunted creature is put into a graveyard, the creature or spell with Haunt can perform an effect again.
- Bloodthirst (red/green, Gruul): When creatures with Bloodthirst are played, they gain a boost to their power and toughness if an opponent was already dealt damage that turn. For example, a 2/3 creature with Bloodthirst 3 could come into play as a 5/6.
- Replicate (blue/red, Izzet): Spells with Replicate allow a given cost to be paid any number of times, and the spell is copied that many times. Each copy can have a new target
- Hellbent (black/red, Rakdos): Cards with the Hellbent ability word gain additional attributes when their controllers have no cards in their hand. It is very similar to the Odyssey block's threshold ability, but revolves around the hand instead.
- Graft (green/blue, Simic): Similar to Modular from the Mirrodin block, cards with the Graft ability come into play with +1/+1 counters in accordance with the number associated with their Graft ability. When another creature comes into play, a card with Graft may move one of its +1/+1 counters onto that creature.
- Forecast (white/blue, Azorius): Rather than play a card from their hand, a player may use its Forecast ability during their upkeep, and only once per turn. To use Forecast, the player pays a cost and reveals the card with Forecast in his/her hand. Forecast effects are often either a lesser version of the main spell or a support effect for the main spell. A card with similar mechanic, Infernal Spawn of Evil, was first seen in Unglued.

Ravnica block includes many mono-color cards which encourage people to play with multiple colors. Ravnica: City of Guilds featured cards which have activated abilities that use mana of different color from the cards' color. Guildpact introduced cards which are enhanced if another mana color is used to play the card. In Dissension, in addition to the first 'group' of abilities, another group of mono-color cards have abilities associated with two colors, but must be played with mana of a different color or else the card must be sacrificed. An example is Azorius Herald. It is a white creature with a life gain effect (white's specialty), as well as unblockability (blue's specialty). However, if Azorius Herald is played without blue mana, it must be sacrificed just after it comes into play.

Dissension features the return of the popular split card mechanic originally from Invasion and Apocalypse. There are 10 gold split cards representing some combinations of the other guilds of Ravnica. The allied color guilds are represented in uncommon split cards, whereas the enemy color guilds are represented in rare split cards.

== Storyline ==
Each of the guilds had been at war with each other for centuries, and the only thing that made the leaders agree to a truce was the fact that the dead had begun haunting the plane. They decided that each guild would specialize in two colors of magic and have specific jobs in the city to stretch the limited resources and maintain order, including by banning war completely.

The game and novels begin 9999 years after the Guildpact was formed, on the eve of the decamillennial celebrations. All three books were written by Cory J. Herndon and published by Wizards of the Coast.

=== Ravnica ===
As the preparations for the celebrations are getting finished, tensions between the guilds have reached the breaking point. Things aren't helped any by the fact that, while many don't believe it exists anymore, the still very much alive House Dimir never agreed to the Guildpact. They, along with the Golgari Swarm, almost destroy the core of Selesnyan civilization.

Agrus Kos (A Wojek officer in the Boros Legion), Jarad (Brother of the Devkarin leader Savra), Fonn Zurich (Daughter of a Wojek officer who joined the Selesnya Conclave after her dad's death), Feather (A Firemane angel who worked with Kos), Pivlic (An Orzhov businessman), and Savra (The leader of the Golgari Devkarin elves) are the main characters in the novel who each play their own role. They all come together eventually, and quite a bit of chaos ensues. Savra then tries to take over her guild and resurrect the necromancer Svogthir, and all the characters are thrown into a huge war.

The dark undercity's the domain of the Devkarin elves, and that's where Jarad and the rest run the city with necromancy and hunting skill; while the skies above are policed by Boros angels. They both stay to their own sections, so the Selesnya keep passageways clear with the Ledev, a group of paramilitary soldiers who defend the right of free travel. Fonn, an elite Ledev, guards her priest friend while he travels to the decimillenial celebrations, but an explosion tears through the city and kills him, flings Fonn into Jarad's arms, and causes a lot of trouble for Kos.

With a partner dead (although continuing to appear in the plot in the form of a ghost), Kos embarks on the investigation that takes him throughout the various settings of Ravnica. This involves conflict with some of the most powerful guilds of the plane, with no end in sight to the fighting.

=== Guildpact ===
Like its predecessor, Ravnica: City of Guilds, Guildpact stars Agrus Kos and his business partner/friend Pivlic, as well as several new characters. With their new friend Teysa Karlov, Orzhov baroness of the diseased frontier zone named Utvara, the two begin to unravel an Izzet secret that delves deeper than any of them thought, all the while searching for the missing messenger of Zomaj Hauc, Izzet Guild upper manager and lead engineer of the Cauldron, a powerplant supplying energy to all of the Utvara region.

Crix the goblin finds herself in the hands of the indigenous peoples of Utvara while Baroness Teysa and her minions attempt to gain control of the region that has now become hers to own. But Crix finds that the plains around Utvara are mysterious, full of bizarre creatures that trace back to the ancient days of Ravnica, as well as a race of people who wear fungus on their backs to protect themselves from a spore that got thrown up into the air after the Izzet Guild attempted to "reclaim" the Utvaran region for the previous owner, Teysa's uncle and prodigal father. But as Crix stays out in the spores, strange occurrences with the natives cause her to doubt the truths she holds dear.

Crix manages to manipulate the natives into helping her get to the Cauldron, partially to deliver the message she had been sent to deliver and partially to get to the bottom of this deadly mystery. Meanwhile, unbeknownst to the courier, Agrus Kos and Pivlic have also become aware of the strange behaviors of the natives and begin an expedition to rescue the intrepid Izzet. However, as they work forward toward their goal, both the human and the imp find that it is not as easy of a task as it originally appeared, especially not when the Nephilim, the ancient creatures Crix encounters, become more rampant in this area of the frontier. Since kidnapping is a crime, Kos is propelled forward, but unfortunately for him, his path leads straight to the gates of the Cauldron.

Back in Utvara, things seem to be simple and reclaiming the once lost territory is becoming a task that Teysa Karlov has turned into a lucrative business venture. But while business continues to improve, Teysa begins to uncover a mystery that's plagued her for her entire life. All the issues that go along with it are getting to be too much for someone like her who's getting up in her years. It all culminates in the first Baroness of the Orzhov meeting her enemies face to face.

== Guilds ==
Of the ten guilds that rule Ravnica, four are the focus of this first set in the block. The next expansion, Guildpact, focused only on three other guilds, and the last set in the block, Dissension, introduced the last three guilds. Each guild corresponds to a different two-color combination. The guilds featured in the Ravnica block are:

- The Boros Legion (red/white, Ravnica: City of Guilds): The militaristic guild, they act as enforcers of order on Ravnica, and are not against using force to keep the peace. The Boros Legion is epitomized by the actions of the Wojek League, the police force of Ravnica. They are inspired by the archangel Razia. The champion, Agrus Kos, is a Wojek police officer and was the main character in the Ravnica novels.
- House Dimir (blue/black, Ravnica: City of Guilds): A shadowy guild that few of the common people of Ravnica are sure still exists. The other nine guilds know it does, and that it traffics in secrets, employing a network of spies and assassins to discover them and enforce their use in blackmail. It is led by the eldritch psionic vampire Szadek and the mysterious champion of the guild Circu, Dimir Lobotomist.
- The Golgari Swarm (black/green, Ravnica: City of Guilds): A sect which emphasizes that death is an essential aspect of the life cycle, and which to that end encourages death and plague in order to foster regrowth. They are ruled by a trio of sibling gorgons called The Sisters of Stone Death (Lydya, Lexya and Ludmilla), but their rule is being contested by the elvish shaman Savra.
- The Selesnya Conclave (green/white, Ravnica: City of Guilds): A quasi-monastic order whose members are zealously dedicated to keeping life in balance. The Conclave disapproves strongly of individuality, holding that the good of the whole is always more important than that of a single being. It is directed by The Chorus of the Conclave, a group of mostly ancient dryads. A preacher named Tolsimir Wolfblood is their champion.
- The Izzet League (blue/red, Guildpact): Like mad scientists, the Izzet are responsible for almost all of the beneficial technologies and magics that keep Ravnica running. Unfortunately, their impulsive and reckless research principles mean that just as many have failed experiments with explosive results. Their guild leader is an extremely intelligent but temperamental and egotistic dragon wizard named Niv-Mizzet, the Firemind. The champions of the Izzet are a husband-wife pair of wizards named Tibor and Lumia.
- The Gruul Clans (red/green, Guildpact): The Gruul Clans were originally the Guild of Savage Nature, appointed to speak for and protect the people who lived in the harsh natural environments of Ravnica. As the city expanded over nature, the other nine guilds (specifically the other Green-oriented guilds) began appointing themselves as nature's defenders. Eventually phased out entirely by the rest of the guilds, the Gruul fractured into a myriad of different clans, all bent on destroying civilization. Some do it for revenge, others simply because they like to smash stuff. The biggest clan is ruled by the cyclops Borborygmos. Despite not being affiliated with any of the clans, the members view Ulasht, the Hate Seed, as their champion as it represents all they stand for.
- The Orzhov Syndicate (white/black, Guildpact): While masquerading as a religion, the Orzhov are actually Mafia-like business people. With no economic transaction that isn't directly or indirectly under their control, they are directed by the Ghost Council of Orzhova, composed of the spirits of former Orzhov Patriarchs and Matriarchs. Teysa, Orzhov Scion, is the champion of the guild, and plays a major part in the book series.
- The Azorius Senate (white/blue, Dissension): The lawmakers of Ravnica, founded by Azor, hence the name Azorius Senate. The Senate is obsessed with keeping the status quo, no matter the cost. Their current leader, Grand Arbiter Augustin IV, believes that the best way to serve the city is to make any sort of action illegal. For his hierarchical and bureaucratic guild, history, stability, and the rule of law are paramount. The Grand Arbiter consults a sphinx known as Isperia the Inscrutable, who is the champion of the Azorius.
- The Simic Combine (green/blue, Dissension): The Simic's original role was to protect and preserve what was left of Ravnica's natural ecosystems. Despite their best efforts, they failed, and there is no place on Ravnica that is left to nature. Now, the Simic Combine spends their resources creating new - and often frightening - species of creatures that not only survive in the stone jungles of Ravnica, but thrive. The guild is headed by the distant and cool elvish biomancer Momir Vig, Simic Visionary. The Simic champion is known as Experiment Kraj, the culmination of all of Vig's previous experiments. It is intended to be the ultimate life form and rapidly "adapts" to change.
- The Cult of Rakdos (black/red, Dissension): Named after its demon leader, Rakdos the Defiler. The Cult of Rakdos is completely self-absorbed, out only for a good time. However, their idea of a "good time" usually involves murder and mayhem – the more bloody and depraved, the better. The cult would love to rule Ravnica and turn it into one big slaughter-fest, but to them, it's the process of random death and destruction that is fulfilling, not the goal. Fortunately for the Rakdos, their interest in the dark art of death has made them into top-notch mercenaries and assassins, which the other guilds are more than happy to take advantage of. The guild's champion is Lyzolda, the Blood Witch. She is at the forefront of most of the guild's macabre sacrificial ceremonies.

Each guild has the following cards:

- A legendary leader, whose mana cost includes two mana of each of the guild's colors.
- A legendary champion, whose abilities encourage players to play with cards of both of the guild's colors. The champion includes one mana of each of the guild's colors in its cost.
  - Note: The aforementioned definition of guild leader and guild champion is solely based on game mechanics, not the story. Some guilds have the properties of their champions and leaders swapped around.
- A signet, cluestone, and locket, which are common artifacts that produce one mana of each of the guild's colors.
- A common "karoo" or "bounce" land, which returns a land to hand when it comes into play (tapped), but produces 2 mana of the guild's colors.
- An uncommon "guildhome" land, which produces colorless mana but has a special ability.
- A rare "shock" land that has two basic land types (even though it is non-basic), which can be tapped for one of two possible colors of mana. "Shocklands" normally enter play tapped but can enter untapped for a payment of 2 life (a Shock to the player).
- A rare guild-affiliated artifact.
- Three hybrid mana cards, one per rarity level; the uncommon one is always a "guildmage" which costs two hybrid mana to play, has a power/toughness of 2/2, and has two activated abilities (one associated with each of its colors).

The appearance of a guild symbol in the background of a card's text box identifies that card's guild affiliation. For example, the symbol of the green-white Selesnya guild appears on green-white cards, cards with the convoke mechanic, lands that produce green and white mana, and so on. The guild symbols have no effect on game play.

Other cycles include the Leylines (one for each color) and the Nephilim (one for each four-color combinations).

== Notable cards ==
Notable cards of Ravnica: City of Guilds include Dark Confidant and Life from the Loam.

Guildpact also includes Magic's first creatures with exactly four colors, the Nephilim.

== Reception ==
Ravnica won the 2005 Origins Award as "Best Collectible Card Game or Expansion".

Cameron Kunzelman, for Kotaku, highlighted that "from the perspective of the health of Magic, it was a rough time. 2003’s Mirrodin set had been plagued with card bannings that turned many people off of the game, and the following year’s Kamigawa further alienated many players with confusing mechanics and cards. As a set, Ravnica was an escape from economic peril for Magic". He wrote that the guilds "define the landscape and structure of life within Ravnica, and each has a particular function in the city that relates to their color pairing in Magic’s card game. This is the true stroke of brilliance when it comes to Ravnica from both a worldbuilding and gameplay perspective. [...] Ravnica’s big move was to create color pairs, figure out what those pairs felt like, and then to create a world in which those different perspectives could live in contest with one another. It meant that players could identify with a guild. It gave all of the gameplay and storytelling something to hang on together. It also gave a name to all of these tendencies that had already existed in the game for more than a decade, and today when you say 'Dimir,' an enfranchised player is going to know that you mean a combination of blue and black cards.".

== Legacy ==
The plane of Ravnica was revisited in the Return to Ravnica (2012) block, and then again in the Guilds of Ravnica (2018), Ravnica Allegiance (2019) and War of the Spark (2019) sets.

It was also adapted as a campaign setting for the 5th edition of Dungeons & Dragons with the publication of the sourcebook Guildmasters' Guide to Ravnica in 2018.

== See also ==
- Ravnica (disambiguation): lists some real places called Ravnica.
