= Guildmasters' Guide to Ravnica =

Tabletop role-playing game supplement

- Rules required: Dungeons & Dragons, 5th edition
- Character levels: 1-2
- Campaign setting: Multiverse (Magic: The Gathering), Ravnica
- Authors: Wizards RPG Team
- First published: November 20, 2018
- Pages: 256
- ISBN: 978-0-7869-6659-2

Guildmasters' Guide to Ravnica is a sourcebook that details the Ravnica campaign setting for the 5th edition of the Dungeons & Dragons fantasy role-playing game published in November 2018. The world of Ravnica was originally created for the Magic: The Gathering collectible card game and first appeared in the card set Ravnica: City of Guilds, which was released in 2005. It is a high-magic world with a loose Slavic flavor, and features a single city which spans the entire planet that is controlled by ten competing guilds of different ideologies.

== Contents ==
Guildmasters' Guide to Ravnica is a 256-page campaign and adventure guide for using the Ravnica setting, from the collectible card game Magic: The Gathering, in the 5th edition. The book includes a ninety page overview of "the ten guilds of Ravnica along with the Tenth District where most of the guilds operate. There's also nearly 40 pages dedicated to building adventures in Ravnica that include hooks to include different guilds. The book also contains about 70 pages filled with stat blocks for the monsters and NPCs that occupy Ravnica".

The book expands on game elements for the 5th edition, such as:

- Five new races — centaurs, minotaurs, loxodon, Vedalken, and Simic hybrids
- Two subclass options — the Order Domain Cleric and the Circle of Spores Druid
- Ravnica themed magic items and treasure

== Publication history ==
Starting in 2016, James Wyatt, a "longtime Wizards employee who worked on D&D for over a decade before moving over to Magic in 2014", began to write a series of free PDF releases called Plane Shift where various Magic: The Gathering planes were adapted for Dungeons & Dragons. The positive response to the "Plane Shift" articles lead to the publication of Guildmasters' Guide to Ravnica, the first full hardcover Dungeons & Dragons guide to the Magic setting. The book's cover and full listing were leaked early on Amazon in July 2018.

Guildmasters' Guide to Ravnica was published on November 20, 2018 and features cover art by Magali Villeneuve. Wyatt was the lead designer on the book and he stated "this book is, essentially, Plane Shift: Ravnica". Nathan Stewart, director of Dungeons & Dragons, said in a press statement: "With the huge surge in popularity of D&D and Magic's commitment to bring the lore and storytelling to life, the timing seemed perfect. Ravnica is full of adventure possibilities and I can't wait for fans to jump in to embody a member of one [of] the iconic guilds". Elaine Chase, vice president, global brand strategy and marketing for Magic: The Gathering, said in a press release: "It's super cool for fans of D&D and Magic to be playing together in the same multiverse".

== Related products ==
=== Plane Shift Series ===
The various planes from Magic: The Gathering were first adapted for Dungeons & Dragons in a series of free PDF releases called Plane Shift by James Wyatt. Wyatt also writes the text for the series of Art of Magic: The Gathering coffee table books, which reprint illustrations from the cards with details for each plane's lore; the Plane Shift releases were created to allow players to use those books as campaign setting guides by providing the necessary rule adaptations. Between 2016 and 2018, six Plane Shift articles were released: Amonkhet, Dominaria, Innistrad, Ixalan, Kaladesh, and Zendikar, along with an Ixalan-set adventure.

However, these articles are not considered official material for organized play. In 2017, Mike Mearls wrote: "It's basically a thing James does for fun, and we don't want to burden it with needing all the work required to make it official".

=== Guilds of Ravnica ===
Guilds of Ravnica was a Magic: The Gathering post-block set expansion released on October 5, 2018. The three related card sets carried "the classic collectible card game into its 26th year".

=== Icons of the Realm ===
WizKids released a set of 55 Guildmasters' Guide to Ravnica themed Dungeons & Dragons miniatures as part of their Icons of the Realm blind box line. It was nominated for "Best Game Accessory" in the 2019 Origins Award.

== Reception ==
In Publishers Weekly's "Best-selling Books Week Ending December 3, 2018", Guildmasters' Guide to Ravnica was #17 in "Hardcover Nonfiction" and the book was called a "Black Friday winner".

Richard Jansen-Parkes, for the UK print magazine Tabletop Gaming, wrote "in terms of raw mechanical content Guildmasters' Guide to Ravnica is solid throughout, with long sections laying out creatures and monsters unique to the plane as well as a heaping of flavourful magic items. However, while the surface-level information about the great city is stellar – the art is beautiful throughout – it all feels a little shallow when you come to plot an actual adventure there. It's clear that Ravnica is a realm that was never intended to live and breathe in the way that you'd expect from an RPG setting, and while Guildmasters' Guide to Ravnica goes some way to ironing this out there's still a lot of work for the DM to do. [...] It's a fascinating world to dabble in and borrow from, but falls just short of being a viable plug-and-play setting".

Gavin Sheehan, for Bleeding Cool, wrote "overall, Guildmasters' Guide to Ravnica is a fine addition to 5E, but I also recognize this isn't going to be for everyone. [...] DM's and players alike should recognize that there are people who love Dungeons & Dragons to death but have zero interest in Magic: The Gathering. I would recommend this book for people who have played MTG and understand a little bit of what's going on, or players who want to learn more about this world and want to incorporate more of it. It's not impossible to get people with no interest involved, but do prepare yourself for a steeper climb up the hill if you do".

Matthew Beilman, for CBR, highlighted the book's setting and wrote: "Ravnica is a rich setting with countless story hooks available for adventurers. The 10 guilds and their machinations on the world city guarantee there is never a shortage of intrigue or varying ways to run a campaign. More traditional dungeon crawls and monster hunting is totally viable, but it's the technological and social elements of the worldwide city that make this setting truly magic".

In January 2020, Christian Hoffer, for ComicBook.com, highlighted that over the past 18 months Wizards of the Coast has published "product tie-ins with Stranger Things, Rick & Morty, Critical Role, and Magic: The Gathering, plus several new products meant to appeal to new players that have never played D&D before. [...] Some fans feel that this push for new players has come at the cost of keeping the game's current players sated. These players wonder why D&D is dedicating resources towards Ravnica (from Magic: The Gathering) and Exandria (from Critical Role) instead of dusting off classic campaign settings like Greyhawk or Dragonlance or Dark Sun, worlds that are mentioned in D&D's core rulebooks but haven't gotten any kind of strong focus". Hoffer reported that the 5th Edition development process is deliberately slow with the Dungeons & Dragons team publishing about three books a year (from adventure campaigns and rulebooks to campaign setting books). Collaborative IP books, such as Guildmaster's Guide to Ravnica, Acquisitions Incorporated, and Explorer's Guide to Wildemount, were added "to the schedule in addition to D&D's three annual publications" and thus didn't impact plans to release older settings for the 5th Edition.
