= Theros Beyond Death =

Magic: The Gathering expansion set

- Released: January 24, 2020
- Size: 254 cards
- Development code: Baseball
- Expansion code: THB
← Throne of Eldraine	Ikoria: Lair of Behemoths →

Theros Beyond Death is a Magic: The Gathering expansion set. It is not part of a block. It was released on January 24, 2020. The set's development codename is "Baseball", and its expansion code is THB.

== Themes ==
Like Theros, Theros Beyond Death takes place on the fictional plane of Theros, which is inspired by Greek mythology. This set was a top-bottom design; "top-bottom sets and blocks are centered around a distinct flavorful theme, as though they were a movie or a comic book with a card game tie-in. [...] The world of Theros is another top-bottom design, with ideas of ancient Greece dictating how the original Theros block and the subsequent Theros: Beyond Death set were designed. Spartans, gorgons, hydras, satyrs, seaside temples, sirens and more populate these sets, with an enchantment-based theme to represent the omnipresent power of the gods".

=== Planeswalkers ===
Elspeth and Ashiok are two of the returning Planeswalkers in this storyline. In the story trailer, "Elspeth attempts to escape the underworld of Theros". "Elspeth is a planeswalker who hasn't been seen since the last Theros set, having been slain by the god Heliod after serving his wishes as he feared her power and ability to kill deities on the plane. Ashiok most recently appeared during War of the Spark, the set that released dozens of planeswalkers into Standard at the same time, but didn't have a starring role in the narrative". Screen Rant called Elspeth "a fan favorite" and highlighted that "Ashiok's design is unique" and that "they're extremely well-suited to being Elspeth's foil".

Theros Beyond Death also introduces the new Planeswalker Calix who was created by Klothys, the god of destiny, to be her Agent of Fate with the goal of trying to stop Elspeth from leaving the Therosian underworld.

== Mechanics ==
Theros Beyond Death introduced a new keyword called Escape. Unlike most spells, those with escape can be cast from the graveyard by exiling other cards from one's graveyard in addition to paying mana. Some creatures receive an additional bonus when they escape.

== Related products ==
=== Mythic Odysseys of Theros ===
Mythic Odysseys of Theros (2020) was the second Magic: The Gathering campaign setting adapted for Dungeons & Dragons and was released in the summer of 2020 after delays due to the COVID-19 pandemic. In February 2020, Screen Rant reported that "As popular as the setting has been thanks to its Greek influences, the most recent set has experienced some controversy. Following the poor handling of the novel that accompanied the previous set War of the Spark, the story material for Theros Beyond Death was delayed indefinitely; no novel was released, and story updates were never posted on Magic's website. This has disappointed fans greatly, as some very popular characters appeared in Theros Beyond Death and players bemoaned missing the chance to learn more about them. The official statement from Wizards is that it is waiting for the proper time and channel to release the story materials. A return to prominence for the setting in the form of a Dungeons & Dragons book could be just the opportunity they're waiting for".

When asked in an interview on what elements from the card game were carried over and what elements were cut during development, James Wyatt said, "I think the process was more addictive than anything else, we took the world guides that were created for Theros for the card sets and expanded those to flesh it out. I think of Magic worldbuilding like building a movie set. The old-fashioned stereotype of the movie set where you walk down the streets of the town in the western and it's just a facade and there are no actual buildings behind them. The Magic team is very good at creating the illusion that there is a world beyond those walls, but D&D players need to be able to go there, in ways that the card set doesn't. So, we did a lot of fleshing out".

== Reception ==
Cameron Kunzelman, for Paste, highlighted the set's use for new Magic players. He wrote, "Theros: Beyond Death, the new set of cards from Magic, should obviously be evaluated from the angle of what it does to all of the various bizarro formats and ways to play this game. But on a fundamental level, what you need to know right now is if it is approachable and if it allows for cool gameplay situations. [...] [This] set really rewards some highly synergistic strategies. [...] The other synergistic strategy you’re encouraged to work with in the set is the new Escape mechanic. [...] Beyond those two particular mechanical synergies, Beyond Death does all the things a good Magic set does. There's a wide variety of cards and interactions that all seem to work in tandem with one another, and it doesn't seem as if certain ways of playing the game are fundamentally broken in either a good or a bad way. This is a perfectly playable set of Magic cards that would be a good introduction to the game, although probably not as good as one of the Magic 20XX products that are intended to give players a baseline expectation of what the game is about".

Ethan Gach, for Kotaku, wrote that "the cards are lovely, full of bucolic groves, sun-soaked marble buildings, and people decked out in soft robes and shimmering armor. The mechanics are easy to wrap your head around while still having deeper implications for those who love to get way into the weeds of theory-crafting and deck-building. [...] Theros Beyond Death has strong thematic underpinnings too. Devotion plays off Greek polytheism and treats faith as an accruable resource to alter events in the material world. Escape treats death as the imprisonment of the body rather than its destruction. [...] That duality between order and chaos feels more elegant in Theros than in many past sets, and Arena remains a better vehicle than ever for navigating it".

Gina Lees, for PCGamesN, commented that "Magic: The Gathering’s latest expansion, Theros Beyond Death, pushes me out of that comfort zone. Before I know it, I’m creating decks that previously would have made me slightly nauseous". Lees also highlighted that "Theros Beyond Death doesn't just boast new mechanics; there are plenty of new spells that I’ve been slowly chewing my way through. The Green cards are proving to be the most effective so far [...]. Theros Beyond Death also adds a bunch of new Artifacts that you’ll surely want to make room for in your deck. [...] It's a courageous, radical expansion that has created edge-of-your-seat games and reignited my sense of adventure in Magic, something that Throne of Eldraine’s Adventure cards never could".

Joshua Nelson, for Bleeding Cool, reviewed a Theros Beyond Death Booster Draft Box, a Theros Beyond Death Bundle, and the two Planeswalker decks. The two Planeswalker decks are themed around Ashiok and Elspeth; Nelson highlighted that, "Elspeth is a fairly strong candidate for decent decks built around her in Oathbreaker [...]. Ashiok is a very different sort of Planeswalker card than Elspeth. [...] Each Planeswalker deck not only features a 60-card deck with a foil Planeswalker that the deck is built around, but also comes with a deck box, a nifty and convenient starter guide for new players, two booster draft packs from Theros: Beyond Death, and a code for each deck for use on Magic: The Gathering: Arena! [...] A final note, the Planeswalker deck series actually is being discontinued after Theros: Beyond Death". Nelson also wrote: "As for the booster box, let me just say that not all booster boxes in the set have the same level of luck to them. [...] I got a resounding… Four mythic rare cards. That is about a 1:12.25 rate, which is over 1.5 times worse than the average, one-in-eight rates", however, when using the booster box for Sealed gameplay Nelson reported that they "did quite well. I can attribute that pretty easily to the amount of prior research I have conducted about the set, and I implore all players to do research before going into a Limited environment for sure. [...] I find that Sealed is swingier than Draft because of the amount of variance in the contents of the packs".
