= Kaladesh =

Block of expansion sets in Magic: The Gathering

- Released: September 30, 2016
- Size: 264 cards
- Mechanics: Vehicles, Fabricate and Energy counters
- Designers: Mark Rosewater (co-lead), Shawn Main (co-lead), Scott Van Essen, Mark Gottlieb, Adam Prosak, Ben Hayes, Drew Nolosco, Jonathon Loucks
- Developers: Erik Lauer (co-lead), Ian Duke (co-lead), Doug Beyer, Ben Hayes, Gavin Verhey, Tim Aten, Melissa DeTora, Matt Tabak, Eli Shiffrin
- Development code: Lock
- Expansion code: KLD

First set in the Kaladesh block
Kaladesh	Aether Revolt
← Eldritch Moon	Aether Revolt →
← Shadows over Innistrad block	Amonkhet block →

Aether Revolt
- Released: January 20, 2017
- Size: 184 cards
- Designers: Mark Gottlieb (lead), Mark Rosewater, Ken Nagle, Gavin Verhey, Adam Prosak, Ari Levitch
- Developers: Ben Hayes (lead), Sam Stoddard, Ethan Fleischer, Adam Prosak, Yoni Skolnik, Tim Aten
- Development code: Stock
- Expansion code: AER

Second set in the Kaladesh block
Kaladesh	Aether Revolt
← Kaladesh	Amonkhet →
← Shadows over Innistrad block	Amonkhet block →

Kaladesh is a Magic: The Gathering expansion block consisting of the sets Kaladesh and Aether Revolt. The block debuted with the release of Kaladesh on September 30, 2016. The block is set on the plane of Kaladesh (later renamed Avishkar), the original home of planeswalker Chandra Nalaar, and features an emphasis on artifacts, their creators and the magical aether which powers them.

== Plot ==
The block focuses on a Steampunk aesthetic, with the steam replaced by the powerful material aether. The Gatewatch go to Chandra Nalaar's home world, the titular plane of Kaladesh, where she finds her mother (presumed dead) and almost kills Tezzeret. Tezzeret later kidnaps Rashmi, winner of the famous Inventor's Fair, and begins a dastardly plot to control the ruling Consulate. With the Consulate imprisoning inventors and confiscating their devices following the Fair, tensions between the populace and the government reach a boiling point, as depicted in Aether Revolt.

== Mechanics ==
On August 25, 2016, Mark Rosewater stated on his blog that Kaladesh's non-evergreen mechanics will be all-new. The block has three new mechanics present in both sets, revealed at PAX West 2016.

- Energy: A new type of persistent counter that players can obtain and spend to pay certain costs on cards, such as Aetherworks Marvel. According to head designer Mark Rosewater, this mechanic was attempted before in Mirrodin and Alara as Esper's mechanic before being refined for Kaladesh.
- Vehicles: A new artifact subtype with the "Crew" ability. To pay for a cost of Crew X, a player may tap any number of untapped creatures with total power X or greater to turn that Vehicle into an artifact creature until end of turn. One example of this is in the card Skysovereign, Consul Flagship.
- Fabricate: A keyword appearing on creature cards. When a creature with Fabricate X enters the battlefield, its controller may either put X +1/+1 counters on it or create X 1/1 Servo artifact creature tokens, as seen on Cultivator of Blades.

== Related products ==
=== Art book ===
The Art of Magic: The Gathering – Kaladesh (2017) by James Wyatt was published by VIZ Media in January 2017. Jay Annelli, for CoolStuffInc, wrote that Kaladesh "was the first new plane to get an art book, and the first to forego a Planeswalker's Guide because of the art books. Because the Kaladesh block focused on Ghirapur, the city where the Inventors' Fair was happening, the book likewise focuses on the central city. [...] Where I would describe the Zendikar and Innistrad books as horizontal, encompassing a wide breadth of information about their respective planes, Kaladesh's art book has a much more vertical approach, with a lot of depth on the singular city of Ghirapur". Lauren Orsini, for Forbes, highlighted that the 240 paged book features the artwork of 95 artists. Orsini wrote, "the Kaladesh artbook fills us in on the rich history of the plane, and why today's political struggles are directly tied to events a hundred years ago. Though they differ in strategies, each faction in Aether Revolt wants the same thing—a steady supply of aether for the people's use. [...] I read the Kaladesh art book before I even played with the new set of Magic cards. It's the first time I've done this, and I think it improved my game. By understanding the connections between the elements of the Kaladesh world, I drew connections between various cards that I'd never considered before. For example, the art book showed me that in the lore, dwarves who inhabit Kaladesh are known for their skill with flying vehicles. So I created a deck heavy on both with creatures like Depala, Pilot Exemplar and vehicles like Aethersphere Harvester".

Cameron Kunzelman, for Paste, highlighted that "from a practical perspective, the work that the Magic Creative team does is pretty spectacular. They begin with a set of material preconceptions about the world, like Kaladesh's natural resource of aether, and then build out from there in order to understand what kinds of historical conditions might exist within those confines. [...] There's something wonderful about the inventors of Kaladesh living in the Venn diagram space of where Silicon Valley libertarians and hardcore Marxists both want us to be: people interacting with the world on their own terms and finding their own fulfillment while helping out others implicitly. There's a bit of solarpunk optimism in there that I find refreshing after coming off of two Magic stories where entire worlds were wrecked by Lovecraftian horrors".

=== Kaladesh Remastered ===
Kaladesh Remastered is a reprint of the Kaladesh block exclusively for MTG Arena; it was released in November 2020. Eric Hillery, for Bleeding Cool, wrote that "featuring selected reprints from Kaladesh and Aether Revolt — with each card being new to Arena — this set brings back three planeswalkers who've been on hiatus since War of the Spark, three other active members of the Gatewatch, and, of course, a litany of new mechanics and interactions. [...] The bottom line: if you haven't played through Kaladesh before, or if you're ready for a fresh re-imagining in Arena, enjoy! Especially to players looking for formats outside of Standard, Kaladesh Remastered is certainly worth a few gems and wildcards". Jamie Lovett, for ComicBook.com, reported that similar to the Amonkhet Remastered set, "Kaladesh Remastered is designed with limited play in mind. [...] Like the Amonkhet block sets, Kaladesh and Aether Revolt debuted in Magic: The Gathering Arena during the game's closed beta testing phase but were removed before the game went into open beta. The Magic: The Gathering Arena team has long stated that it hoped to eventually return those lost beta sets to the game, and this year they're making good on that idea".

== Reception ==
The Kaladesh Booster won the Origins Award for "Fan Favorite Collectible Game of 2016".

Kyle Chapman, reviewing the Kaladesh set for Ars Technica, wrote "Even without looking at any of the cards from this new set, the packaging and promotional material makes a tone shift very clear; colour, celebration, and creation jump out at you immediately. [...] The designers have blended classic steampunk elements (protruding, brutal machinery) with fantasy tropes (elves, gremlins, and the first Magic dwarves in just under a decade). [...] Compared to last year's weird Eldrazi cards, the mechanics may seem straightforward, but there are enough puzzles in both deckbuilding and play to keep experienced players engaged, whilst being less intimidating to newer players. This is pushed further by the synergies in the block that go unnamed (mainly around artifacts), adding yet another layer to consider". Chapman also highlighted that the set must balance story development for both the plane of Kaladesh and for the Gatewatch members; so given the random nature of booster packs and the limited flavor text on cards, "one of the problems that has always plagued Magic is the difficulty of communicating the full narrative of the set. To help address this, a new 'Story Spotlight' marker appears on five cards in Kaladesh that depict some of the major events, each with a link to a website with short stories that Wizards of the Coast have been publishing in the lead-up to the set's release".

Cameron Kunzelman, reviewing the Kaladesh block for Paste, commented that it is an "artifact block" with a focus on artifact cards and themes of machinery. As a result, Kunzelman highlighted that "deck builders flocked" to specific artifact cards during the Kaladesh set "in order to generate very fast, very efficient and very splashy win conditions for their decks" with the various strategies boiling down to: "Get your artifact on the battlefield and execute your plan quickly. These strategies were dominant in casual and competitive play, and many of them won so quickly that a slight misplay on the part of an opponent would mean that they had no chance of recovering. It was not, as they say, 'fun.' Aether Revolt, the newly-released second half of the Kaladesh block, is an answer to Kaladesh in many ways. [...] However, due to various problems, each of these ways of playing the game are impacted in a negative way with Aether Revolt. Playing constructed Magic leaves you playing against powerful artifacts in some games, hyper-synergistic giant creatures, or a literal infinite combo in others. Playing any kind of limited game, which encompasses Sealed and Draft play, means that you are always at the mercy of a player who opens a more powerful artifact than you". Kunzelman would not recommend this block to new or returning players given the swingy nature of play and "lack of clear synergies".

Kyle Chapman, reviewing the Aether Revolt set for Ars Technica, commented that while there are swingy cards in this set, they're also "very risky" to use. Chapman wrote that "AER takes Kaladesh's strengths and pushes them even further, with deep strategy available in both deck construction and in-game decisions, and an especially promising Limited environment. The complexity is at breaking point, but it's so well-managed it still works—the mechanics are easy to explain and grasp, the basics have already been taught in Kaladesh, and there are seed cards for teaching newer players how to use cards together for potent combos. [...] Kaladesh has been one of the most fun drafting formats in recent years, and we expect AER Limited to be similar, whilst putting a new spin on how to approach the Kaladesh cards". Chapman also highlighted that Story Spotlights have continued for this set and "after a 2016 for Magic that was generally darker and edgier in tone, it's good to see that this world hasn't gone grimdark. AER manages to focus on conflict whilst still hitting the bright themes of Kaladesh: colour, ornateness, and most uniquely, the passion of invention and creation. [...] The split between Magic's player base is something to be embraced—long-form fluff for those that are interested, thematic reinforcement of mood for the less interested—but over the course of the Kaladesh block, it's fallen a little short of the right balance".
