= Explorer's Guide to Wildemount =

Tabletop role-playing game supplement for Dungeons & Dragons

- Cover
- Rules required: Dungeons & Dragons 5th edition
- Character levels: 1-3
- Campaign setting: Exandria
- Authors: Matthew Mercer, Chris Lockey, James Introcaso, James Haeck, Wizards RPG Team
- First published: March 17, 2020
- Pages: 304
- ISBN: 978-0786966912

Explorer's Guide to Wildemount is a sourcebook that details the continent of Wildemount from the Critical Role campaign setting for the 5th edition of the Dungeons & Dragons fantasy role-playing game. Matthew Mercer, creator of the setting, said the book is "meant to be both [...] for fans of Critical Role" and "for people who have never watched an episode. It's an entirely new setting to set an entire campaign or more in". It was published by Wizards of the Coast and released on March 17, 2020.

== Summary ==
Explorer's Guide to Wildemount is the first official Wizards of the Coast Critical Role campaign setting book.

=== Contents ===
"The 304-page campaign guide takes players to a continent rife with conflict and magic" and details the four distinct regions of Wildemount in the world of Exandria. It also includes a starter adventure for each of the four regions (each designed to take characters from levels 1–3).

This book adds a variety of options for both players and Dungeon Masters, such as:

- Exandria lore and deities along with thirteen new factions within Wildemount
- Adds four new player races (Pallid Elves, Lotusden Halflings, Draconblood and Ravenite Dragonborns), and reprints twelve player races (Aarakocra, Aasimar, Bugbears, Firbolgs, Genasi, Goblins, Goliaths, Hobgoblins, Orcs, Sea Elves, Tabaxi, and Tortles).
- Adds a new fighter subclass, Echo Knight, and two new wizard subclasses, Chronurgy and Graviturgy
- Adds dunamancy, a new source of magic, with 15 new spells
- New character background ideas and tables
- Over 20 new monsters
- New magic items called the Vestiges of Divergence

=== Setting ===
The book is set at a time when tensions between the Dwendalian Empire and the Kryn Dynasty—two of Wildemount's major powers, which are divided by the Ashkeeper Peaks mountain range—are very high and war is imminent. Western Wildemount is governed by the Dwendalian Empire and is ruled by King Bertrand Dwendal. A council of powerful archmages called the Cerberus Assembly act as advisors to the House of Dwendal. The region of Xhorhas, which occupies the eastern side of the continent, is regarded as an inhospitable wasteland by the Empire. Xhorhas is governed by the Kryn Dynasty, ruled by the Bright Queen Leylas Kryn, and is primarily home to the drow and other races considered to be monstrous. The Menagerie Coast sits on the south-western coastline next to the Lucidian Ocean and is governed by the Clovis Concord, a coalition of eight city-states which includes Nicodranas and Port Damali. The tundra in the northernmost region of Wildemount is known as the Greying Wildlands; the harsh environment leaves it sparsely populated compared to other regions. Eiselcross is the frozen continent north of Wildemount.

== Publication history ==
The new sourcebook was announced on January 13, 2020 after being leaked through an Amazon product listing on January 12, 2020. It was published by Wizards of the Coast on March 17, 2020. Mercer said "about half the art in the book comes directly from the Critical Role community. All artists that, for the most part, had never worked for Wizards before". Wildemount was designed with an Eastern European influence; specifically, the Dwendalian Empire was inspired by 15th century Russia and Prussia, Xhorhas by 13th-century Romania, and the edges by 14th-century Spain.

The book is also available as a digital product through the following Wizards of the Coast licensees: D&D Beyond, Fantasy Grounds, and Roll20. On March 17, 2020, as part of Roll20's "Stay at Home, Play at Home" initiative during the COVID-19 pandemic, the Frozen Sick adventure and the Palebank Village section from the Explorer's Guide to Wildemount were released for free on the Roll20 platform.

In April 2020, D&D Beyond reported "of the 28 million characters using Explorer's Guide to Wildemount [on their platform], 49% of them picked the Echo Knight. Coming in second is the Chronurgy Magic Wizard at 30%, with the Graviturgy Magic Wizard at 21%". The top five spells prepared were: Magnify Gravity, Fortune's Favor, Pulse Wave, Gift of Alacrity, and Gravity Sinkhole.

=== Development ===
In response to questions on whether the book was canon and whether it had gone through rigorous playtesting, Jeremy Crawford, the lead rules designer of Dungeons & Dragons, confirmed that the Explorer's Guide to Wildemount is an official Wizards of the Coast product. He wrote that "like every D&D book, its rules have been tested by players, developed by the D&D team, and vetted by me".

Chris Perkins, Wizards of the Coast internal lead on the Explorer's Guide to Wildemount, said:

Exandria, which is the world in which Wildemount is a continent, fits into the D&D multiverse insofar as it is another world in the material plane. So just like Eberron or Toril, or Krynn, or Athas, it exists in that same sphere. [...] This is a universe born out of one man's imagination, for the most part. And, it is also born out a livestream game. This is kind of a first for official D&D campaign settings. [...] In terms of the world itself and what differentiates it, I think that it's a unique blend of classic D&D adventuring with kind of a political background. A tense moment in the history of Exandria where great political powers are vying for control over one continent's resources. A continent that has seen its fair share of calamities in the past. The characters have a chance to prevent another one, effectively. And that's kind of interesting.

Inverse reported that the Explorer's Guide to Wildemount follows the trend of Wizards of the Coast publishing material that originated in Dungeons & Dragons live play series. Acquisitions Incorporated (2019) was based on the live play series it was named after and Baldur's Gate: Descent into Avernus (2019) included Joe Manganiello's character Arkhan. ComicBook highlighted that Wizards of the Coast has a deliberately slow development process "with the D&D team formally releasing about three books a year. One of these three annual books is a full length campaign, which leaves two publishing slots to publish new rulebooks, updated adventures, and other supplementary publications like campaign setting books". Over the past three years, collaborations such as Guildmaster's Guide to Ravnica, Acquisitions Incorporated, and Explorer's Guide to Wildemount were added "to the schedule in addition to D&D's three annual publications".

== Related products ==
=== Critical Role ===
Critical Role is an American web series in which a group of professional voice actors play Dungeons & Dragons with Mercer as the Dungeon Master and creator of the world Exandria. A number of licensed works based on the show have been created, including the Explorer's Guide to Wildemount. The continent of Wildemount, created by Mercer, was first mentioned in Critical Role's Campaign One as the place the villainous Delilah and Sylas Briarwood originated from and later as the home continent of Sam Riegel's player character Taryon Darrington. Wildemount is the main setting of Critical Role's second campaign. Explorer's Guide to Wildemount includes series canon up to Campaign Two Episode 50. Haeck said "right at the beginning of the book, we make it very clear that this book is set in a very specific point of time and that your canon will diverge wildly from that of Critical Role." Academic Emma French, in Real Life in Real Time: Live Streaming Culture (2023), highlighted the Explorer's Guide to Wildemount as an example of Wizards of the Coast "directly" acknowledging Critical Role – "while this may simply be a decision by Wizards of the Coast to capitalize on the new revenues that actual play's popularity has generated, it shows that these live streams have the ability not simply to promote, but also to alter the game product with which it is engaging".

==== The Mighty Nein ====
In January 2023, it was announced that Critical Role's second campaign will receive an animated television adaptation for Amazon Prime Video titled The Mighty Nein (2025). The series is executive produced by Tasha Huo, Sam Riegel, Travis Willingham, Chris Prynoski, Shannon Prynoski, Antonio Canobbio and Ben Kalina; Metapigeon, Amazon Studios, and Titmouse serve as the production companies. The first season premiered on November 19, 2025.

=== Tal'Dorei Campaign Setting ===
In 2017, the Critical Role team and Green Ronin Publishing released a sourcebook about the continent of Tal'Dorei, one of the continents in the fictional world of Exandria and the primary setting of the first campaign of the web series. Critical Role: Tal'Dorei Campaign Setting was released using the Wizards of the Coast Open Game License and is not considered "official" Dungeons & Dragons material (unlike the Explorer's Guide to Wildemount, which was published by Wizards of the Coast and is considered "official" material). The book does include a brief description of Wildemount in a section on the distant regions of Exandria.

=== D&D Adventurers League ===
Both the official adventure module Critical Role: Call of the Netherdeep and the Explorer's Guide to Wildemount were adapted for play in the D&D Adventurers League, the Wizards of the Coast organized play association for Dungeons & Dragons, upon the release of the Call of the Netherdeep in March 2022. The 14th version of the Adventurers League Player's Guide (March 2024) added Tal'Dorei Reborn (2022) as an option for additional rules in Adventurers League Critical Role campaigns.

== Reception ==
=== Pre-release ===
On January 13, 2020, Explorer's Guide to Wildemount "rocketed to #3 on Amazon's best sellers list, then, according to Wizards of the Coast's Greg Tito, reached the #1 spot by Monday afternoon. Through pre-orders alone, Explorer's Guide to Wildemount has become the best-selling book on Amazon, outpacing New York Times best sellers and all other books". Corey Plante, for Inverse, reported that "in terms of new mechanics, Explorer's Guide to Wildemount could be even more significant to D&D than Wizards' November release, Eberron: Rising From the Last War, which introduced Artificer as a new class thanks to the unique school of magic Matthew Mercer created for Critical Role Season 2: Dunamancy". Plante commented that "at a more fundamental level, dunamancy acknowledges the Many Worlds Interpretation of quantum mechanics, which asserts that an infinite number of branching timelines exist" and while the exact presentation "remains to be seen", he thought it sounded "exciting".

Christian Hoffer, for ComicBook, highlighted the differences in the publication history of 4th and 5th Edition: "by this point in 4th Edition, we had campaign setting books for the Forgotten Realms, Dark Sun, the Shadowfell, Eberron, and the Underdark" while in 5th Edition, the campaign setting books released were "for the Sword Coast and Eberron, along with Ravnica and now Wildemount". Hoffer also reported on the divide between fans of older Dungeons & Dragons settings and fans of the newer third-party inspired settings. He wrote "I think that some of these issues could be solved by peeking into the pipeline and getting some confirmation that more campaign settings are being worked on. [...] The success of Fifth Edition means that there's not a rush to publish material before it becomes obsolete, and that means that the timeline that D&D books will come out is a lot slower". Sead Fadilpasic, for TheGamer, reported on the negative criticism the Explorer's Guide to Wildemount announcement received and on Matthew Mercer's response on Reddit. Fadilpasic wrote that Mercer "addressed the frustrations of many fans in terms of the campaign setting", noting Mercer's agreement with fans and that he stressed "the choice of Wildemount changes nothing in any existing plans the Wizards may have for those legacy settings. [...] His post garnered a lot of attention – mostly positive – with people praising his work and encouraging him, going to show that while those with disparaging opinions and voices may be loud, they still do not make up the entire community".

=== Critical reception ===
In Publishers Weekly's "Best-selling Books Week Ending March 21, 2020", Explorer's Guide to Wildemount was #1 in "Hardcover Nonfiction" and #4 overall. Publishers Weekly highlighted that the book sold 26,589 units and "captured the East North Central region's attention". In the following week, "Best-selling Books Week Ending March 28, 2020", the book dropped to #9 in "Hardcover Nonfiction".

Charlie Hall, for Polygon, wrote that the book is "written with a warmth and care uncommon in these sorts of things" and "may be the best example of its type yet created for the role-playing game's 5th edition. [...] The world of Wildemount itself feels more fresh and current than anything that has come before". Hall highlighted that book breaks from traditional fantasy tropes and that it "gives guidance on how the different races perceive one another based on their cultural attitudes and prejudices". Alex Meehan of Dicebreaker highlighted the sourcebook's expansive amount of detail and the "variety on display" where the sourcebook mostly "provides some incredibly well-realised places for DMs to utilise and players to visit" and the various location adventure hooks which provide NPCs along with "narrative threads" as a starting point. Meehan opined that the "Explorer's Guide to Wildemount is at its best when it steps away from the more traditional fantasy aspects of set-dressing and veers into the bizarre". Richard Jansen-Parkes, for the UK print magazine Tabletop Gaming, wrote that Explorer's Guide to Wildemount "doesn’t concern itself with trying to shake-up the classic D&D formula too much" which he viewed as a great strength of the sourcebook. He noted "sparks of originality here and there", such as the Krynn Dynasty, with "the most creative ideas" focused on the "local level, rather than ones that radically shape the flow of the entire world". Jansen-Parkes also thought most locations "stand out" and "feel worthy of hosting an adventure". In contrast, Dan Arndt of The Fandomentals opined that the setting didn't standout in comparison to the Forgotten Realms with Wildemount feeling more like a remix of the "standard 'land of adventure'" style seen in 5E's base setting. Arndt noted that he enjoyed "sparks of that weird Mercer creativity here and there" especially in the parts further away from civilization. For non-Critical Role fans, Arndt thought it would be most useful for people who want to run "war campaigns" as the setting has "two roughly equal powers vying for control" unlike most 5E settings along with many other factions also vying for power.

As a sourcebook, Arndt praised the Heroic Chronicle for character creation along with the new dunamancy themed player options. Gavin Sheehan of Bleeding Cool commented that the "really awesome stuff" are the dunamancy themed subclasses. Jansen-Parkes similarly commented that dunamancy is "the coolest" and noted that the fighter and spellcaster player options introduce "a few ways to start messing with things like time, gravity and fate and, honestly, really drives home the fact that Wildemount got its start as a homebrew setting". Meehan thought the Heroic Chronicle was "far superior to the shallow backgrounds available" in the standard Player's Handbook (2014) character creation process. Meehan opined that the wide range of detailed information included in the sourcebook, from player options to adventures, made her "feel that Explorer's Guide to Wildemount is the most worthwhile Dungeons & Dragons 5E sourcebook Wizards of the Coast has released since the original Player's Handbook".

Sheehan noted that the sourcebook includes "an introspective look at how" various races, including the standard Dungeons & Dragons races, "operate" within Wildemount and thought that the "additional bonuses" included in the player race options are neither mechanically "game-breaking" nor narrative "placebos". Hoffer, for ComicBook, highlighted that Explorer's Guide to Wildemount reuses the Orc race stats from Eberron: Rising From the Last War rather than the stats originally published in Volo's Guide to Monsters. Some of the differences include not having an intelligence stat penalty and the "Menacing" trait. Hoffer wrote that the book "takes an important step in specifying that no race of intelligent creatures in [sic] inherently evil, nor are they inherently less smart than other races. While many still see the idea of 'race' in Dungeons & Dragons as problematic, Explorer's Guide to Wildemount at least removes one of the most problematic aspects of that part of D&D". James Grebey, for Syfy Wire, also highlighted that the book "adds some nuance to one of the most harmful tropes in D&D" and "crucially, while there are bad actors among the Kryn, they're not evil solely because of their race. Traditionally, that hasn't been the case for D&D. [...] With the Kryn Dynasty, at least, Mercer is offering a way for players to add some crucial context and subtlety to their tabletops". Academics Lisa Horton and David Beard, in the book The Routledge Handbook of Remix Studies and Digital Humanities, viewed the Kryn Dynasty and Xhorhasian culture as "a departure and significant extension of D&D lore surrounding drow" and highlighted that their religion is centered on "the physical manifestation of light itself, the Luxon, and the pursuit off immortality". Arndt, however, thought the setting's attempt at subverting the evil drow trope was not "the biggest step up" as Wildemount drow are "religious nutjobs with suicidal tendencies".
