= Nic Kelman =

American novelist

- Born: New York City, U.S.
- Citizenship: American and British
- Education: Massachusetts Institute of Technology (BS); Brown University (MFA)
- Spouse: Ana Tajder-Kelman (2012 - Present)
- Writing career
- Genres: Literary Fiction, Non-Fiction, Screenwriting
- Notable works: girls, Video Game Art, How To Pass As Human
- Website: nkelman.com

Nic Kelman has been a writer of novels, short stories, non-fiction, screenplays, and essays for more than 20 years.

== Early life and education ==
Kelman was born to an American father and British mother in New York City. At the age of 12, his family moved to the United Kingdom, but Kelman returned to attend the Massachusetts Institute of Technology for University. There he received a Bachelor of Science in Brain and Cognitive Science and Minored in Film and Media Studies, completing an undergraduate thesis in Infant Vision Research. At MIT, he was awarded the Burchard Scholarship for excellence in the arts. From 1998 to 2000 he attended Brown University where he received a Master of Fine Arts in Creative Writing - Fiction.

== Work ==
Kelman's first novel, girls, was a San Francisco Chronicle and New York Journal News Best Book of the Year when it was published in hardcover by Little, Brown and Company in 2003. It was released in paperback in 2005 and has since been translated into more than a dozen languages. A bestseller in several European countries, it was particularly successful in Italy where it was published by Fazi Editore. Focused on the dangers of toxic masculinity long before the term entered the popular vernacular, girls began as Kelman’s MFA thesis at Brown where it was awarded the James Assatly Prize for fiction. Feminist writer, Carole Maso was his thesis advisor.

Kelman's second book, Video Game Art, was published worldwide in French and English by Assouline in 2006. The first book of Art History published on the topic, it has introduction written by Kelman's former MIT Professor, pop culture icon, Dr. Henry Jenkins.

Kelman's third book, the novel Il Comportamento della Luce [The Behavior of Light] was published by Fazi Editore in 2008.

In 2011, Kelman's first screenplay, "Genneris," was purchased by Steven Spielberg at DreamWorks Studios. Since then, Kelman has also written original screenplays for other major studios, directors and producers including Warner Brothers, Paramount Pictures, Lorenzo di Bonaventura and Roland Emmerich.

Kelman's illustrated novel, "How To Pass As Human," was published by Dark Horse Books in 2015 and is currently under development as a streaming series.

From August 2017 to March 2021, Kelman worked at Wizards of the Coast, most recently as Director of Entertainment Development.

As well as writing his own projects, he currently works as a freelance Narrative and IP Development Consultant.

== Bibliography ==
=== Novels ===
- girls (2003)
- Il Comportamento della Luce (2008)
- How To Pass As Human (2015)

=== Non-Fiction Books ===
- Video Game Art (2006)

=== Screenwriting ===
- "Genneris" (2011)
- “Interface” (2012)
- "The Outpost" (2013)
- "Emergence" (2014)
- “Stalag X” (2015)
- “The Phantom” (2016)
