= Magic: The Gathering Arena =

Video game

- Developer: Wizards Digital Games Studio
- Publisher: Wizards of the Coast
- Designer: Richard Garfield
- Engine: Unity
- Platforms: Microsoft Windows, macOS, iOS, Android
- Release: Microsoft Windows; September 26, 2019; macOS; June 25, 2020; iOS, Android; March 24, 2021
- Genre: Digital collectible card game
- Mode: Multiplayer

Magic: The Gathering Arena or MTG Arena is a free-to-play digital collectible card game developed and published by Wizards of the Coast (WotC). The game is a digital adaptation based on the Magic: The Gathering (MTG) card game, allowing players to gain cards through booster packs, in-game achievements or microtransaction purchases, and build their own decks to challenge other players. The game was released in a beta state in November 2017, and was fully released for Microsoft Windows users in September 2019, and a macOS version on June 25, 2020. Mobile device versions were released in March 2021.

== Gameplay ==
MTG Arena follows the same rules as the physical card game, in which players use decks of cards that include land cards that generate five separate colors of mana, and play cards that consume that mana to summon creatures, cast offensive and defensive spells, and/or activate effects and abilities. Players battle other players using a selected deck, with the goal of reducing the opponent's life-total to zero before their opponent can do the same to them.

MTG Arena supports both Constructed Deck play and Limited play. In Constructed play, players create decks of cards from their library. The game gives new players a library of base cards and pre-made decks from those cards, but as players win matches and complete daily quests, they can earn new booster packs that add cards to their library, and allow players to then customize their decks and improve them. Unlike most physical packs of Magic cards and those used in Limited events, which usually contain 15-16 playable cards, purchased packs in MTG Arena contain 8 cards (1 Mythic/Rare, 2 Uncommon, and 5 Common).

The most popular type of limited play, booster draft, pits players against seven other players by having them choose and acquire cards in turn from packs that are supplied by the game. Those cards are then used to create a Limited deck used for the event. An additional Limited format called Sealed allows players to open a set number of special booster packs and build a deck only with cards from those packs. In both varieties of Limited, players attempt to win as many matches as they can with that deck. In best-of-one, the event ends once the player has either won 7 or lost 3 matches. In best-of-three, the event ends after the player completes three matches, regardless of their outcome. In most Limited events, the player keeps all the cards drafted and adds them to their library, and there are generally prizes based on wins that may give booster packs or in-game currency as a reward.

MTG Arena supports best-of-three and best-of-one matches for both Limited and Constructed. In best-of-one games, players' opening hands are not random; rather, the client generates multiple hands and selects one based on certain properties of the player's deck. Hand-smoothing exists to reduce the variance inherent to the game, which is exacerbated by the best-of-one format. The exact algorithm is not known to the public.

Arena follows the popular freemium paradigm, allowing users to play for free with optional microtransactions. Players can use real-world currency to buy gems or in-game currency, which can be spent on booster packs or enter draft or constructed events. Gems are also given as rewards for winning draft mode. In addition to regular cards from the set, a player may also receive "Wildcards" of any rarity in a booster pack or as a reward. The player may swap these Wildcards for any card of the same rarity. Magic: The Gathering allows decks with up to four copies of the same card, so once a player earns a fifth copy of a common or uncommon card through booster packs, this instead is used to add to a Vault meter, based on its rarity. When the Vault meter is filled, the player can open it to gain Wildcards. Fifth copies of rares or mythic rares are instead turned directly into gems. The game does not include a feature to trade cards with other players as the developers state this would affect their ability to offer in-game rewards at the level they want while effectively calibrating the economy to make it easy and efficient to get cards through game-play.

As with the physical edition, new expansions are introduced into MTG Arena as other sets are retired. When the game was first released, the bulk of the game's modes required players to build "standard" decks that use cards from the current active expansions. However, support for "historic" decks that use any card available in the game has increased since its initial release, and is now (2020) an active part of the game with multiple releases of Historic and Modern sets and anthologies throughout a year. As of May 2020, Historic modes contribute to progression of daily wins and quests and WotC has committed to support the "historic" format going forward permanently. Ranked play with these Historic decks will be tracked separately from those in the Standard play, and players are now able to purchase packs of or craft both standard and historic cards.

With the addition of the Core 2021 set in July 2020, Arena was also updated to include support for the new "Jumpstart" booster mode, themed 20-card packs designed to allow a player to quickly get into the game.

Because of its digital format, Arena has also run limited events and game modes, bringing back previously-banned cards from physical play, but with rebalanced abilities or costs to address the prior reasoning for their ban. A new Jumpstart collection, Historic Horizons, to be released in August 2021, will include 31 cards that have no physical equivalent with rules and abilities that only function in the digital space, including cards with complex rules that cannot fit within the printed card frame. Vice president of design Aaron Forsythe and game director Jay Parker said they were using this release to test the waters with a card set targeting the players of Magic that played exclusively in the digital space, keeping to relatively tame mechanics to see how players reacted to this.

== Development ==
Arena is designed to be a more modern method of playing Magic: The Gathering with other players while using a computer compared to Magic: The Gathering Online. A key goal of its development was to allow Arena to remain current with physical releases of new expansions to the physical game, with the goal of having the digital version of the expansion available the same day in retail. For example, the Dominaria expansion was released simultaneously as a retail product and within Arena on April 27, 2018, and "Core 19" was available in Arena on the same day as the set's paper release date of July 13, 2018. Since 2020, new sets have released in MTG:Arena and MTG:Online one day before the set's prerelease date, typically the Thursday before a set releases for paper tabletop magic. Arena follows Magic the Gathering's Standard format, where cards from the last few major expansions are used to construct decks for Standard constructed play and are then rotated out of Standard on a set schedule. After cards are rotated out of Standard, players can construct decks with rotated cards for play in various "Historic" modes.

The core part of the development of Arena was its game rules engine (GRE). The goal of this engine was to make a system that could handle current and future rulesets for Magic to support their plan to remain concurrent with the physical releases. The GRE provided means to implement per-card level rules and effects, allowing it to be expandable. The GRE also helped speed up play in the game. Compared to other digital card games like Hearthstone where an opponent cannot interact during a player's turn, Magic: The Gathering allows opponents to react throughout a player's turn. In previous iterations of Magic games that allowed this, including both Online and Duels of the Planeswalkers, these systems were found to slow down the game while waiting for an opponent to react or opt not to react. Instead, in Arena, the developers could use the per-card support to determine when reactions to a played card needed to be allowed, using observations from Magic tournament play. This helped to speed up the game for both players while still allowing for complete card reactions to be played out.

Arena was not anticipated to replace Magic: The Gathering Online; which will continue to support the whole of Magic's card history, while Arena only includes cards in the current Standard sets from its initial release and any expansions going forward. Arena was first tested in a closed beta. An initial stress-test beta to selected users started on November 3, 2017, with those selected limited to non-disclosure agreements for testing purposes, while others could apply to gain access to later stages of the closed beta. The first large-scale closed beta started in December 2017. Its open beta started on September 27, 2018, with its full launch in 2019. Arena includes a battle pass feature, known in-game as the "Mastery Pass". While Arena will continue to be available directly from Wizards of the Coast, it was also released on the Epic Games Store in early 2020, and a macOS client was introduced in June 2020.

In July 2019, Joe Deaux, for Bloomberg, reported that "nearly 3 million active users will be playing Arena by the end of this year, KeyBanc estimates, and that could swell to nearly 11 million by 2021 according to its bull case scenario—especially if it expands from PCs to mobile. Those estimates are of active users, and registered users could be higher by the millions. According to Hasbro, as of July, 2019 a billion games had already been played online". Of Hasbro's franchise brands, only Magic and Monopoly logged revenue gains in 2019. Brett Andress, an analyst at KeyBanc Capital Markets, predicted Magic: The Gathering Arena could add as much as 98 cents a share in incremental earnings to results by 2021 (which was at least a 20% boost).

Arena had its full release for Windows users on September 26, 2019, aligned with the release of the tabletop card game expansion, Throne of Eldraine. The macOS client released on June 25, 2020. An early access version for certain Android devices was released on January 28, 2021, while full versions for all Android and iOS devices were released on March 24, 2021. These versions support cross-save progression with the desktop clients.

== Esports ==
In December 2018, Wizards of the Coast announced at The Game Awards 2018 that an esports pool would be created for the game for 2019. The $10 million prize pool will be equally divided between the traditional tabletop game and the new digital version Arena.

In 2019, Wizards of the Coast unveiled a new esports program which started with a special Mythic Invitational event and a $1 million prize pool at PAX East, in Boston, on the weekend of March 28–31. The event was held in three double-elimination brackets using a new MTG format described as "Duo Standard" requiring two complete decks with no sideboarding. The event was won by Andrea "Mengu09" Mengucci claiming the top prize of $250,000. On February 16, 2020 Paulo Vitor Damo Da Rosa won the 2019 Magic World Championship. The format for the top 8 of this tournament was standard and the matches were played on Arena.

On June 18, 2021, WotC had announced that the prize pool for the Magic World Championship XXVII (October 8–10) will have a new total of $250,000 which is 750k lower than the previous year of $1 million. The Magic World Championship XXVII was streamed live using Twitch, allowing viewers to see both players' hands simultaneously on the Arena client. Japanese player Yuta Takahashi won the championship, and in addition to winning the prize pool, was also depicted on a card's art in a later set, with flavor text reading "Yuta Takahashi, World Champion XXVII".
