= Amonkhet =

Block of expansion sets in Magic: The Gathering

- Released: April 28, 2017
- Size: 264 cards
- Designers: Mark Rosewater (lead), Ethan Fleischer (lead), Yoni Skolnik, Shawn Main, Jackie Lee, Kimberley J. Kreines, James Hata, Sam Stoddard, Ben Hayes
- Developers: Dave Humpherys (lead), Bryan Hawley, Ian Duke, Eric Lauer, Jackie Lee, Ari Levitch, Kimberley J. Kreines, Tim Aten, Mons Johnson
- Development code: Barrel
- Expansion code: AKH

First set in the Amonkhet block
Amonkhet	Hour of Devastation
← Aether Revolt	Hour of Devastation →
← Kaladesh	Ixalan →

Hour of Devastation
- Released: July 14, 2017
- Size: 184 Cards
- Designers: Shawn Main (lead), Ken Nagle, Jackie Lee, Jules Robins, Sam Stoddard, Mel Li, Mark Rosewater
- Developers: Ian Duke (lead), Ben Hayes, Adam Prosak, Ken Nagle, Jackie Lee, Kimberley J. Kreines, Melissa DeTora
- Development code: Monkeys Laughs
- Expansion code: HOU

Second set in the Amonkhet block
Amonkhet	Hour of Devastation
← Amonkhet	Ixalan →
← Kaladesh	Ixalan →

Amonkhet is a Magic: The Gathering expansion block consisting of the sets Amonkhet and Hour of Devastation. Amonkhet was released on April 28, 2017, and Hour of Devastation was released on July 14, 2017. The eponymous new plane has an ancient Egyptian theme, and features concepts like mummies and embalming.

== Plot ==
The block's setting is inspired by ancient Egypt, with themes of social hierarchy and contrast between life and death. In Amonkhet, Gatewatch set out to destroy the evil dragon planeswalker Nicol Bolas after learning of his dominion over the titular desert plane Amonkhet. In the desert, they find a city (Naktamun) teeming with food, water, and life, ruled by five gods, with Bolas seemingly absent altogether. The people of Naktamun train their entire lives to die in ritual combat, hoping to experience pure bliss in the afterlife when the God-Pharaoh (Bolas) returns to Amonkhet. In Hour of Devastation, Bolas returns as prophesied, only to raze Naktamun and reveal the true purpose of the training and combat: to create an army of physically-perfect and combat-adept mummies to serve as an unquestionably loyal army.

== Mechanics ==
Amonkhet introduced three new mechanics:

- Exert: A keyword appearing on creatures. If a creature is exerted upon attacking or using an activated ability, it provides a bonus but does not untap during its controller's following turn, as seen on Glorybringer.
- Embalm: Paying the Embalm cost of a creature and exiling it from the graveyard creates a white Zombie creature token that is an exact copy of that creature, such as Angel of Sanctions.
- Aftermath: A new split card mechanic present on instants and sorceries. The first half is played as normal, but the Aftermath half can only be cast from a graveyard, such as Dusk to Dawn.

Hour of Devastation introduced two additional mechanics:

- Eternalize: Similar to Embalm, paying a creature's Eternalize cost and exiling it from the graveyard creates a black zombie creature token copy of that creature with base power and toughness 4/4, as with Champion of Wits.
- Afflict: A creature with Afflict will cause an opponent to lose a defined amount of life when the creature becomes blocked in combat, as with Neheb, the Eternal.

== Related products ==
=== Art book ===
The Art of Magic: The Gathering – Amonkhet (2017) by James Wyatt was published by VIZ Media in July 2017. Rebecca Angel, for GeekDad, highlighted that Wyatt "has done an excellent job bringing together all the aspects of one of the newest worlds in Magic. It is not just a book of full-color illustrations, but the inspiration and talent behind the art and lore of Amonkhet. My son thought the book did a good job explaining the story line and world-building. He also thought it was cool to see The Reward cycle of cards that are in this book, even though they didn't make it into the set. [...] With over two hundred pages, the book explains the details about the world of Amonkhet. Each god, monster, and race are explained in the context of the overall multiverse of Magic, but specifically within this storyline. [...] Reading the text alongside the art is an immersive experience in world building".

=== Amonkhet Remastered ===
Amonkhet Remastered is a reprint of the Amonkhet block exclusively for MTG Arena; it was released on August 13, 2020. Jamie Lovett, for ComicBook.com, reported that this set added "300 cards to the Historic format, curated from the Amonkket block sets – Amonkhet and Hour of Devastation – that were available on Magic: The Gathering Arena during its closed beta. The return of Amonkhet cards to the game is a move that fans have been requesting since the Historic format debuted last year".

== Reception ==
Rafael Abrahams, for Kotaku in May 2017, highlighted the competitive play format where players hoped Amonkhet would "breathe fresh life into it" after the domination of "a couple of overpowered cards". Abrahams explained that, "a powerful white planeswalker named Gideon, Ally of Zendikar has dominated the Standard format since his release in fall 2015's Battle for Zendikar expansion. [...] A big appeal of Magic is the diversity of playstyles available to players, and a format with only one or two viable deck archetypes is boring. It's possible that decks featuring new gems from Amonkhet will fill the void left by Copy Cat, but recent tournament results suggest that Gideon is here to stay, and may warp Standard just as severely as Copy Cat did. [...] If Gideon and Mardu Vehicles put up the dominant numbers that we saw at the Atlanta Open, confidence in Wizards's ability to keep competitive Magic dynamic and fun will drop, and the community may cry out for yet another banning. If Amonkhet brings new and interesting strategies to the forefront that break the shackles of battlecruiser Magic, then perhaps Wizards's lateness in banning Copy Cat will be forgiven, and players will continue to invest and experiment in Standard".

Kyle Chapman, reviewing the Amonkhet set for Ars Technica, wrote "Amonkhet is explicitly based on Egyptian mythology, and from glancing at a few opened booster packs, many of the classic tropes jump out from the art. [...] The real joy, though, is the sinister undercurrent slowly revealed through looking at the full set, especially the flavour text [...]. As the first expansion of a new block, Amonkhet is full of original mechanics, but also features a returning favourite that hasn't been seen since Alara way back in 2009: Cycling. [...] Existing Magic players may remember God cards from Theros block, and this new cycle suffers a little in comparison; the new Gods have decent art and powerful abilities, but no unique frame, and lack some of the novel impact the second time around. [...] In general, the gameplay is deep but not intimidating; plenty of the mechanics revolve around choice and interaction between different components of your deck, leading to some difficult strategic decision [...]. The mechanics are mainly modular rather than linear, which means a lot of the assessment will be on a card-by-card basis".

Mike Linnemann (also known as Vorthos Mike), for CoolStuffInc, highlighted how the art of the Amonkhet set showcases the storyline. Linnemann wrote, "the diehold vorthos community tried to ascertain if Dragon Planeswalker Nicol Bolas made this plane or commandeered it, creating the culture from scratch or warping it. Nicol Bolas arrived here. He did not make this plane. [...] We can see the cutthroat competition and not just the Black Trial of Ambition which forces you to turn on friends and teammates. [...] This is a North Korea culture, walled out from the rest of the world, if you are curious how a real world example could be like Amonkhet. Except, in the case of Amonkhet, grandparents grew up as babies with no one older than them. [...] Taking the Trials as a visual cue, we can see this is a top down set, where a culture and flavor drove the design rather than mechanics. We can see this young woman [...] mentioning in her flavor text that she will also be harvested, though she doesn't say if that is by participating in the trial or by other means. [...] The art is only supposed to be made for usage at card size and this is successful. Sometimes we see a few images larger and we see the Hollywood makeup and seams on the otherwise perfect depiction".

Riley Hutchins, for ComicBook.com, highlighted the Archenemy format where "three players team up to take down an overwhelmingly powerful final boss". Hutchins wrote, "in the new Archenemy: Nicol Bolas, you and your friends will be thrown into an intense battle, in which one will take the role of the evil beast, and the rest will act as the Gatewatch (Nissa, Gideon, and Chandra). [...] After playing the new Archenemy extensively with a full playgroup, it is easily one of the most frustrating yet satisfying experiences in magic. It has the true feeling of terror when Nicol Bolas slaughters your entire and had us out of seats cheering and screaming when the villain was finally slain (4 games later). One thing that really stood out is the synergy of the team working together. [...] The trio is forced to work together, with all decks complementing each other, and it being impossible to take down Nicol Bolas alone. Overall Archenemy: Nicol Bolas is a lot of fun to play, especially if you dive head first into the story".

Kyle Chapman, reviewing the Hour of Devastation set for Ars Technica, wrote, "The gleaming city has become a besieged, panicked landscape, with some classic dark Egyptian tropes taking centre stage—the river turning to blood, a plague of locusts, the marauding living dead. There's also clever references to Amonkhet, with ruined versions of buildings seen on old cards turning up in the art for new cards. [...] Magic's story continues to be surprisingly decent for a card game, and many of the cards depict key beats [...] and there's long-form stories that Wizards publish online for those who want more background. [...] HOU features good, solid Magic gameplay, with a few twists to make it stand out. There's a concerted effort to produce something for most types of player; sleek and efficient for the highly competitive, big and stompy for the hedonist, clever and weird for the experimental, flavourful for the lore nerd. [...] From a creative standpoint, it seems the designers are listening to feedback about their recurring protagonists being too prominent, but sticking to their guns about worlds being connected to a larger narrative".
