= Dominaria =

Magic: The Gathering expansion set

- Released: April 27, 2018
- Size: 269 cards
- Development code: Soup
- Expansion code: DOM
← Rivals of Ixalan	Core Set 19 →
← Ixalan	→

Dominaria is a Magic: The Gathering expansion set. It is not part of a block. In celebration of Magic: The Gathering's 25th anniversary, the story returned to the plane of Dominaria. The expansion was released on April 27, 2018. Martha Wells was the head writer for the expansion.

== Themes ==
=== History ===
Dominaria is the plane where much of the past Magic: The Gathering story was set. Thus, for this expansion, the designers wished to reference that history and make it a relevant part of the gameplay. James Whitbrook, for Io9, highlighted that the Dominaria set brings "players back to the original setting that kicked off Magic's official storyline in 1998, for the first time players have returned to the plane since 2006's Time Spiral. Although Magic: The Gathering is now set in a shared multiverse of elemental planes—full of the powerful spellcasters known as 'Planeswalkers' who could travel between them—the world of Dominaria itself is one of the most important locations in Magic's storied lore, and 'home' to many of the characters and creatures found in Magic's earliest sets, until the storyline started branching out into new worlds in the franchise's ever-growing multiverse in 2003".

"For years, the Skyship Weatherlight played a focal role in Magic's storylines. Invented by the legendary Planeswalker Urza, the Weatherlight was designed to be a ship capable of the impossible– traveling between planes. Crewed by a group of exceptional heroes including Captain Sisay and Gerrard Capashen, the Weatherlight ultimately played a huge role in fighting off the Borg-like Phyrexians as they invaded Dominaria. Seemingly lost to the oceans, the artificer Jhoira recently pulled the remains of the Weatherlight up from the water".

=== Characters ===
The storyline begins directly after Gatewatch's defeat at the hands of Nicol Bolas in the Hour of Devastation (2017) set. Belzenlok, the Elder Demon, is the primary villain of the Dominaria set. The Planeswalkers Liliana Vess and Gideon Jura "have arrived on Dominaria" and together, "they begin a mission to kill Belzenlok, the final demon holding Liliana's contract". A long time ago, Vess had made a deal "in an attempt to preserve her youth" by signing away her soul "to four demons. Then, after acquiring an artifact known as the Chain Veil, she became powerful enough to kill her keepers. Three of them are now dead. Belzenlok is the only one who now remains and he's on her homeworld, Dominaria. However, he's a much more formidable challenge for the necromancer than any of the demons before him, as he's taken control over vast swaths of Dominaria through the power of the Cabal".

The Dominaria set also marks the return of a long thought dead character, the task mage Jaya Ballard.

== Mechanics ==
- Saga Cards: Enchantments that use lore counters in order to trigger an ability, or chapter. Each saga has three "chapters", the first effect activating when the enchantment enters the battlefield and the following two effects triggering at the end of the controller's following draw steps. The saga enchantment is sacrificed after the third chapter.
- Historic: New keyword for referencing Artifact, Saga, and Legendary cards.
- Legendary Sorcery: A card subtype that can only be played if a Legendary Creature or Planeswalker is on the battlefield.
- Kicker: A returning mechanic that allows a player to pay an additional cost when casting the spell with the kicker ability to get an additional effect.
- Hexproof from ...: A new version of the hexproof ability in which the permanent cannot be targeted by spells or abilities controlled by an opponent that have a certain specified quality such as a specific color.

== Reception ==
Cameron Kunzelman, for Paste, commented that "Dominaria is a place in the universe of the game, and it's the place where all of the classic stories took place. [...] In the early 2000s, the Magic became much more about the big universe of planes that the core creators, called planeswalkers, could travel to. Dominaria and its factions, plots, world-destroying characters, and evil villains receded into the background of the game. [...] Coming back to Dominaria has weight. It's uniting different generations of players and trying to knit up nostalgia for past mechanics and concepts while keeping the game fresh and new. [...] Dominaria has felt very rewarding for me both as a player who enjoys where the game is now and as a player who started all the way back in the early 2000s". On the mechanics of the set, Kunzelamn highlighted the new historic cards and wrote "sagas, by the way, are amazing. [...] The focus on historic cards and events means that many of those cards and concepts are 'pushed' so that they see play. [...] It makes for a volatile format, and the strong dependency of some other cards on these legends means that you might sometimes feel punished for not opening or having them".

Alexander Lu, for Comics Beat, highlighted "in a case of good news and bad news for players, Magic unveiled that the promotional card players will receive if they buy a box of Dominaria booster packs from a participating game store is Firesong and Sunspeaker. [...] It's also one of the first red and white legendary creatures that is not focused on interacting with combat– something Commander players have been asking for for a long time. But unlike previous buy-a-box promos, Firesong and Sunspeaker are only available through this promotion. You can't open them in Dominaria boosters. This scarcity has caused a minor uproar among the more fiscally-minded members of Magic‘s community already, with many warning of the precedent that this sets for future expansions".

Beck Holden, for Hipsters of the Coast, highlighted the differing opinions on the Dominaria storyline. Holden wrote, "We wouldn't be having this debate if Alison Luhrs and Kelly Digges hadn't given us a Magic Story for Ixalan that was, if you'll forgive the pun, unrivaled. [...] One of the refrains I've seen repeatedly on Vorthos Twitter is that character depth and character development went by the wayside in Dominaria's story. [...] If [Martha] Wells started to write a serialized story about the ongoing adventures of the Weatherlight's crew, I would read the hell out of it—the characters have archetypal elements, but they have become a fun and delightful family [...]. There seems to be a general consensus that not everything worked, though, although there is debate about what precisely did and did not work. [...] [Nic] Kelman has gotten a lot of flak for his comments on being willing to bend details in the story [...]. I'm not sure if we're going to see a Ravnica story that compares favorably with Ixalan—that's a high bar to clear!—but I still think on the whole this was a reasonably promising start; and that we're going to get to enjoy stories that, on average, compare favorably with most of the Magic Stories of the last few years".
