= Ixalan =

Block of expansion sets in Magic: The Gathering

- Released: September 29, 2017
- Size: 279 cards
- Development code: Ham
- Expansion code: XLN

First set in the Ixalan block
| Ixalan | Rivals of Ixalan |
| ← Hour of Devastation | Rivals of Ixalan → |
| ← Amonkhet | → |

Rivals of Ixalan
- Released: January 19, 2018
- Size: 184 Cards
- Development code: Eggs
- Expansion code: RIX

Second set in the Ixalan block
| Ixalan | Rivals of Ixalan |
| ← Ixalan | Dominaria → |
| ← Amonkhet | → |

Ixalan is a Magic: The Gathering expansion block consisting of the sets Ixalan and Rivals of Ixalan. The first set of the block was released on September 29, 2017 and Rivals of Ixalan was released on January 19, 2018.

== Plot ==
The golden city of Orazca, buried deep in the jungle, houses a great secret. The immortal sun, an artifact of immense power, is hidden there. Now, that secret has become known. The great forces of the plane gather to combat one another in a contest to see who will claim the mighty prize. The plane is home to four primary tribes, each with distinct synergies and advantages that draw off of one another. The merfolk River Heralds, the vampiric Legion of Dusk, the Brazen Coalition of pirates, and the Sun Empire's dinosaur riders all meet in open conflict to decide the fate of their world.

=== Main Factions ===
- Sun Empire: the Empire "controls the eastern coast of Ixalan, called the Sun Coast, as well as their three major cities along the coastal region. [...] While the Empire repels outsiders, they consider the greatest achievement to be victory without killing their opponents. The Empire is in a time of expansion, looking to reclaim old territories and regain their former strength".
- Brazen Coalition: these four pirate fleets "don't control much territory outside of the outlying islands in the northeast and their floating capital of High and Dry. [...] The pirates are the descendants of refugees who fled the Legion of Dusk in Torrezon a century before, believing they could find sanctuary on Ixalan. When the locals proved less than receptive, the refugees turned to piracy to survive".
- River Heralds: the merfolk "are aptly named as they control the nine major rivers of Ixalan, meaning their territory includes most of inland Ixalan. [...] The River Heralds are divided into nine tribes led by Shapers, merfolk wizards and shamans who have taken the name of one of the nine tributaries of Ixalan. [...] The River Heralds believe they were entrusted with the protection of Orazca by the Last Guardian, believing the power contained in the city to be dangerous in mortal hands".
- The Legion of Dusk: they "are the rulers of Torrezon" and "control the southeast coastal region, called Queen's Bay. [...] While most of the Legion of Dusk is human, the nobility and clergy are vampires, turned in a ritual reserved for only the most deserving. Their dogma is to feed on enemies and criminals, and their constant expansion has left them with no short supply of either. They believe that the Immortal Sun will transform their vampirism from everlasting undeath into eternal life".

== Mechanics ==
Ixalan included the following mechanics, a mix of new and returning keywords:

- Enrage: An ability exclusive to dinosaur creatures that triggers when they are dealt damage, such as Ripjaw Raptor.
- Raid: A returning mechanic from Khans of Tarkir block that checks if a creature has attacked this turn, providing various bonuses like the Raid ability on Ruin Raider.
- Explore: An ability appearing on creatures. To explore, a player reveals the top card of his or her library; if it is a land, it is put into their hand, and if it is nonland, the creature gets a +1/+1 counter and the player may choose whether to leave it there or put it into the graveyard, as seen on Merfolk Branchwalker.
- Treasure: A new artifact token that can be tapped and sacrificed to produce one mana of any color, produced by several cards such as Revel in Riches. Treasure tokens are similar to the Etherium Cells created by Tezzeret the Schemer, Gold tokens created by Gild, and the Tempest card Lotus Petal.
- Vehicles: A returning artifact subtype. Vehicles have "Crew X," which allows players to tap any number of untapped creatures with total power X or greater to turn the Vehicle into an artifact creature until end of turn, such as Dusk Legion Dreadnought.
- Transform: A returning mechanic involving double-faced cards, appearing on both enchantments and artifacts, which transform into special lands when specific conditions are met, such as Treasure Map. The transform cards are designed to show a quest for a fantastic location, and the lands on the back half are significantly more powerful than regular lands.

All of the above mechanics also appeared in Rivals of Ixalan, with the addition of one new keyword:

- Ascend: A reminder keyword that provides a bonus if players have the "city's blessing". Players obtain the city's blessing by amassing ten permanents on the board in a game, then retain the city's blessing for the remainder of the game, providing bonuses like that of Kumena's Awakening.

=== Themes ===
Ixalan is an adventure-themed set emphasizing exploration.

- Dinosaurs (green, white, and red): A new creature subtype representing the large reptilian species dominating the plane, with themes including cost reduction and haste thanks to cards like Regisaur Alpha. The set also introduced errata to several older Magic cards with similar creature subtypes, such as Raptor, to become Dinosaurs retroactively.
- Pirates (black, red, and blue): Swashbuckling sailors and fighters who work well in tandem, often focused on aggression as seen on Fathom Fleet Captain.
- Merfolk (blue and green) utilize trickery and deceit to overcome their adversaries, excelling with protection like that of Kopala, Warden of Waves. Merfolk also have a +1/+1 counter subtheme, with many merfolk or merfolk-oriented spells interacting with +1/+1 counters, such as Herald of Secret Streams.
- Vampires (black and white): a bloodthirsty species that drains life incrementally and swarms the board with small creatures, taking advantage of bonuses like that of Sanctum Seeker.

== Related products ==
=== Art book ===
The Art of Magic: The Gathering – Ixalan (2017) by James Wyatt was published by VIZ Media in January 2018. Jay Annelli, for CoolStuffInc, wrote "The Art of Magic: the Gathering – Ixalan switches from the vertical approach of the last two art books to a more horizontal approach, covering the four warring factions of Ixalan in great detail. If you want to know more about the extensive world outside of the continent of Ixalan, well that's not really covered here, but by the end of the book you'd be extremely well acquainted with the continent itself".

== Reception ==
Rich Stein, for Hipsters of the Coast, reviewed the impact of the Ixalan set on the competitive scene from its release to just before the release of the Rivals of Ixalan set (111 days in total). Stein highlighted that during this time period "there were 21 National Championships, 15 Grand Prix events, one Pro Tour, one World Magic Cup, and one World Championship. [...] [In Standard format,] we can see that Amonkhet also has a significant chunk of the pie and that Ixalan is no slouch either. Even though Kaladesh has clear control of the format, the other five expansions are somewhat evenly represented. [...] But, if we take lands out of the equation [...] this change highlights a very simple fact which is that Ixalan’s key role in Standard right now is to provide access to the ally-colored cycle of dual lands. [...] It’s safe to say that Ixalan limited Grand Prix attendance was down from Kaladesh limited Grand Prix attendance and that should be somewhat concerning. [...] Ixalan limited wasn’t bad, per se, but it wasn’t as enticing as Kaladesh limited was last fall".

James Whitbrook, for Kotaku Australia, highlighted the art of the Ixalan set and commented that "pirates, are, amazingly, one of the few avenues that Magic has rarely explored in its fantastical settings, even as its merrily fired goblins out of cannons or created absurd joke series such as Unglued. Dinosaurs, even less so, which is why the world of Ixalan — released last Friday — serves as a perfect mishmash of roaming piratical fleets, packs of dinosaurs, and even some aquatic Merfolk and Vampiric conquistadors thrown in for good measure. It’s like a beautiful mess of the internet’s favourite things, blended together and pressed into a set of cards".

Cassie LaBelle, for US game store Star City Games, highlighted that "Rivals of Ixalan is almost here, and I have to admit that I’m starting to get excited. I get why you might be hesitant to believe that Rivals is going to affect the Standard metagame very much-I had high hopes that Ixalan was going to shake up Standard back in September, and it didn’t really happen. [...] Remember, though, that all four tribes are fully powered up now. Tribal sets are inherently parasitic, and strategies that weren’t quite there in September should be ready to break through once Rivals hits shelves. [...] Regardless, I feel like some of these new cards will end up hogging the Standard spotlight at some point in 2018. From a financial evaluation perspective, one of Rivals‘ biggest quirks is how conditional so many of its cards are. Most of the tribal cards are only good if you’ve got a critical mass of Merfolk or Vampires or whatever, the cards with ascend vary greatly depending on how easy it is for you to get the city’s blessing, and there are a bunch of other rares that require you to jump through a couple of different hoops in order to earn yourself a Tolarian Academy or something. [...] A handful of them will break out, but culling the hits from the misses ahead of time is more difficult than usual".

Bleeding Cool rated Magic: The Gathering as #1 in its "Best Trading Card Game" for 2018 – stating, "a name we were surprised to see make a resurgence this year was Magic: The Gathering. Not like MTG ever vanished or took time out from its regular pace, but we've noticed in 2018 that the series has found a bit of new life for two reasons. The first is that they created some sets that have really put a bit of a kick back into the game both for casual and tournament play. Rivals of Ixalan did well as the other half of the Ixalan block back in January, while Dominaria and Guilds of Ravnica have added bits and pieces to flesh out some of the old color combinations and make them flourish again".

Zach Barash, in a retrospective review for Hipsters of the Coast, wrote, "the past year has been an interesting one for Magic, filled with high highs and low lows. [...] Ixalan introduced a vibrant new world with arguably the greatest storyline of the decade and some much-needed love for Pirates and Dinosaurs, but was counterbalanced by potentially the worst Limited format of the decade. [...] Rivals of Ixalan and Hour of Devastation continued the trend of small sets fixing many of the problems and homogeneity of large set Limited formats, but introduced their own issues. Hour diluted or outright removed many of the primary themes of Amonkhet, while Rivals of Ixalan replaced powerful, uninteractive aggro decks with insanely powerful, completely uninteractive bomb rares. [...] At the beginning of the year, I was excited about GDS3, close to quitting Limited thanks to Ixalan, and enjoying Magic’s story more than I had since Agents of Artifice. Now, I’m disappointed about GDS3 [...], traveling all over the country to play Limited, and disappointed by Dominaria’s overstuffed and rushed story".
