= List of Magic: The Gathering novels =

The following is a list of novels based in the setting of the collectible card game Magic: The Gathering. When Wizards of the Coast was asked how the novels and cards influence each other, Brady Dommermuth, Magic's Creative Director, responded by saying "generally the cards provide the world in which the novels are set, and the novels sometimes provide characters represented on cards. But cards also introduce their own characters that might not appear in the novels. In short, the Magic creative team and the novelists work largely in parallel and inform each other as much as possible." All of the novels take place in the multiverse (the center nexus of which is Dominaria), which consists of an infinite number of infinitely different planes.

The novels from The Brothers' War through Scourge, along with The Thran and the ...of Magic anthologies, are set on the plane of Dominaria and are a roughly chronological timeline of that plane's history. Magic began to venture out of Dominaria and into several new planes in the later novels such as Mirrodin (formerly Argentum) in the Mirrodin Cycle, Kamigawa in the Kamigawa Cycle, and Ravnica in the Ravnica Cycle. The Magic storyline returned to Dominaria with the Time Spiral cycle, and visited Lorwyn with the storyline cycle of the same name. After this, the policy of publishing a trilogy of novels for each year's setting was discontinued; the Alara, Zendikar and Scars of Mirrodin block settings had only a single novel each.

Theros was the last block to receive a companion novel, and only in e-book form, with Wizards of the Coast citing various reasons including a decline in sales and an outdated model as two major contributing factors for the decision. Beginning with the Khans block in 2013, the company decided to tell the storyline through the cards and free online articles and found that more players were familiar with the block story line than were previously when only novels told the story.

This approach continued through 2017. Then, Wizards of the Coast hired novelist and scriptwriter Nic Kelman as their Head of Story and Entertainment. Kelman's task was to assemble all of the lore established from previous card sets and the published novels, comics, and other materials as to create the game's "cosmology" or the story bible that established all the known planes and elements of those planes, the individual Planeswalkers and their connections to others, and other details that then could be passed not only to the teams developing new cards but also to those expanding the franchise with new novels and other content. In 2018, Brandon Sanderson published an e-book, Children of the Nameless, marking the return of novels. War of the Spark: Ravnica (2019) by Greg Weisman was the first print book after an eight-year break. It corresponded with the final set of a three part Ravnica storyline and received a sequel. However, the sequel was widely panned and Wizards of the Coast "canceled plans for the book that was intended for the game's next set, Theros: Beyond Death". Then in 2020, with the Zendikar Rising (2020) set, the Magic storyline returned via story articles on the official website.

In 2025, Wizards announced a standalone print YA novel entitled Strixhaven: Omens of Chaos, written by Seanan McGuire and published by Penguin Random House, which was released along with the Secrets of Strixhaven (2026) set.

== Non-cycle novels ==
The original ten books were deliberately not numbered as a marketing concern. The publishers thought people might shy away from a multi-book series. Some stories are connected, some not. The heroes of Arena, Garth and Rakel, appear in Shattered Chains. The books Whispering Woods, Shattered Chains, and Final Sacrifice by Clayton Emery are known as the "Whispering Woods Trilogy" or "The Greensleeves Trilogy".

All of the non-cycle books were published by Harper Fantasy.

Year	Title	Author	Pages	ISBN
1994	Arena	William R. Forstchen	297	ISBN 0-06-105424-0
1995	Whispering Woods	Clayton Emery	294	ISBN 0-06-105418-6
1995	Shattered Chains	Clayton Emery	288	ISBN 0-06-105419-4
1995	Final Sacrifice	Clayton Emery	312	ISBN 0-7522-0217-0
1995	The Cursed Land	Teri McLaren	290	ISBN 0-06-105016-4
1995	The Prodigal Sorcerer	Mark C. Sumner	309	ISBN 0-06-105476-3
1996	Ashes of the Sun	Hanovi Braddock	304	ISBN 0-06-105649-9
1996	Song of Time	Teri McLaren	304	ISBN 0-06-105622-7
1996	And Peace Shall Sleep	Sonia Orin Lyris	304	ISBN 0-06-105619-7
1996	Dark Legacy	Robert E. Vardeman	368	ISBN 0-06-105697-9

== Cycles and block novels ==
=== Cycle novels ===
All of the below cycled or series books have been published by Wizards of the Coast.

Cycle	Year	Title	Author	Pages	ISBN
Artifacts	1998	The Brothers' War	Jeff Grubb	409	ISBN 0-7869-1170-0
Artifacts	1998	Planeswalker	Lynn Abbey	359	ISBN 0-7869-1182-4
Artifacts	1999	Time Streams	J. Robert King	343	ISBN 0-7869-1344-4
Artifacts	1999	Bloodlines: The Story of Urza's Destiny	Loren L. Coleman	343	ISBN 0-7869-1380-0
Artifacts	1999	The Thran	J. Robert King	311	ISBN 0-7869-1600-1
Ice Age	1999	The Gathering Dark	Jeff Grubb	342	ISBN 0-7869-1357-6
Ice Age	2000	The Eternal Ice	Jeff Grubb	320	ISBN 0-7869-1562-5
Ice Age	2000	The Shattered Alliance	Jeff Grubb	309	ISBN 0-7869-1403-3
Masquerade	1999	Mercadian Masques	Francis Lebaron	341	ISBN 0-7869-1188-3
Masquerade	2000	Nemesis	Paul B. Thompson	320	ISBN 0-7869-1559-5
Masquerade	2000	Prophecy	Vance Moore	311	ISBN 0-7869-1570-6
Invasion	2000	Invasion	J. Robert King	311	ISBN 0-7869-1438-6
Invasion	2001	Planeshift	J. Robert King	311	ISBN 0-7869-1802-0
Invasion	2001	Apocalypse	J. Robert King	308	ISBN 0-7869-1880-2
Odyssey	2000	Odyssey	Vance Moore	320	ISBN 0-7869-1900-0
Odyssey	2001	Chainer's Torment	Scott McGough	320	ISBN 0-7869-2696-1
Odyssey	2001	Judgment	Will McDermott	320	ISBN 0-7869-2743-7
Legends	2001	Johan	Clayton Emery	311	ISBN 0-7869-1803-9
Legends	2001	Jedit	Clayton Emery	320	ISBN 0-7869-1907-8
Legends	2002	Hazezon	Clayton Emery	320	ISBN 0-7869-2792-5
Legends II	2002	Assassin's Blade	Scott McGough	320	ISBN 0-7869-2830-1
Legends II	2003	Emperor's Fist	Scott McGough	320	ISBN 0-7869-2935-9
Legends II	2003	Champion's Trial	Scott McGough	306	ISBN 0-7869-3015-2
Onslaught	2002	Onslaught	J. Robert King	320	ISBN 0-7869-2801-8
Onslaught	2003	Legions	J. Robert King	312	ISBN 0-7869-2914-6
Onslaught	2003	Scourge	J. Robert King	320	ISBN 0-7869-2956-1
Mirrodin	2003	The Moons of Mirrodin	Will McDermott	320	ISBN 0-7869-2995-2
Mirrodin	2004	The Darksteel Eye	Jess Lebow	320	ISBN 0-7869-3140-X
Mirrodin	2004	The Fifth Dawn	Cory Herndon	320	ISBN 0-7869-3205-8
Kamigawa	2004	Outlaw: Champions of Kamigawa	Scott McGough	320	ISBN 0-7869-3357-7
Kamigawa	2005	Heretic: Betrayers of Kamigawa	Scott McGough	320	ISBN 0-7869-3575-8
Kamigawa	2005	Guardian: Saviors of Kamigawa	Scott McGough	320	ISBN 0-7869-3786-6
Ravnica	2005	Ravnica: City of Guilds	Cory J. Herndon	320	ISBN 0-7869-3792-0
Ravnica	2006	Guildpact	Cory J. Herndon	320	ISBN 0-7869-3989-3
Ravnica	2006	Dissension	Cory J. Herndon	320	ISBN 0-7869-4001-8
Time Spiral	2006	Time Spiral	Scott McGough	320	ISBN 0-7869-3988-5
Time Spiral	2007	Planar Chaos	Scott McGough, Timothy Sanders	320	ISBN 0-7869-4249-5
Time Spiral	2007	Future Sight	Scott McGough, John Delaney	320	ISBN 0-7869-4269-X
Lorwyn	2007	Lorwyn	Cory J. Herndon, Scott McGough	320	ISBN 0-7869-4292-4
Lorwyn	2008	Morningtide	Cory J. Herndon, Scott McGough	320	ISBN 0-7869-4790-X
Lorwyn II: Shadowmoor	2008	Shadowmoor	Philip Athans, Susan J. Morris	352	ISBN 0-7869-4840-X
Lorwyn II: Shadowmoor	2008	Eventide	Scott McGough, Cory J. Herndon	320	ISBN 0-7869-4868-X

=== Block novels ===
Block novels are novels which replaced the trilogy (or tetralogy) of novels previously released corresponding to each Magic set. They were introduced in 2009 with Alara Unbroken released for the Shards of Alara block. As the name suggests the block novel follows the story of the card block of the same name.

Year	Title	Author	Pages	ISBN
2009	Alara Unbroken	Doug Beyer	320	ISBN 0-7869-5201-6
2010	Zendikar: In the Teeth of Akoum	Robert B. Wintermute	320	ISBN 0-7869-5476-0
2011	Scars of Mirrodin: The Quest for Karn	Robert B. Wintermute	320	ISBN 0-7869-5774-3

=== Other novels ===
These novels were connected to specific expansion sets without blocks.

Year	Title	Author	Publisher	Pages	ISBN
2019	War of the Spark: Ravnica	Greg Weisman	Del Ray Books	384	ISBN 978-1984817457
2019	War of the Spark: Forsaken	Greg Weisman	Del Ray Books	416	ISBN 978-1984817945
2026	Strixhaven Omens of Chaos	Seanan McGuire	Random House Worlds	413	ISBN 978-0593871430

== Planeswalker novels ==
The Planeswalker novels are a type of Magic novel that was introduced in 2009. Each follows the story of one of Magic's planeswalkers. The first yearly planeswalker novel was released in the winter and the second in the summer of 2009.

Year	Title	Author	Pages	Planeswalker	ISBN
2009	Agents of Artifice	Ari Marmell	390	Jace Beleren	ISBN 0-7869-5134-6
2009	The Purifying Fire	Laura Resnick	400	Chandra Nalaar	ISBN 0-7869-5298-9
2010	Test of Metal	Matthew Stover	352	Tezzeret	ISBN 0-7869-5532-5
2020	Chandra	Vita Ayala	96	Chandra Nalaar	ISBN 1-6840-5427-3

== Block novellas / eBooks ==
For the Return to Ravnica block, a 3-part novella by Doug Beyer was released. Similarly a 2 part novella by Jenna Helland was released for the Theros block.

Block	Year	Title	Author	Pages
Return to Ravnica	2012	Return to Ravnica: The Secretist, Part One	Doug Beyer	67
Return to Ravnica	2013	Gatecrash: The Secretist, Part Two	Doug Beyer	97
Return to Ravnica	2013	Dragon's Maze: The Secretist, Part Three	Doug Beyer	90
Theros	April 1, 2014	Theros: Godsend, Part I	Jenna Helland	124
Theros	May 13, 2014	Journey Into Nyx: Godsend, Part II	Jenna Helland	139
Blockless e-books	December 12, 2018	Children of the Nameless	Brandon Sanderson	127
Blockless e-books	September 4, 2019	Throne of Eldraine: The Wildered Quest	Kate Elliott	208
Blockless e-books	April 7, 2020	Ikoria: Lair of Behemoths - Sundered Bond	Django Wexler	174

== Anthologies ==
The first two Anthologies, Tapestries and Distant Planes were published by Harper Fantasy while all of the others since then have been published by Wizards of the Coast.

Year	Title	Author	Pages	ISBN
1995	Tapestries	Kathy Ice	290	ISBN 0-06-105308-2
1995	Distant Planes	Kathy Ice	384	ISBN 0-06-105765-7
1998	Rath and Storm	Peter Archer	311	ISBN 0-7869-1175-1
1999	The Colors of Magic	Jess Lebow	342	ISBN 0-7869-1323-1
2000	Myths of Magic	Jess Lebow	304	ISBN 0-7869-1529-3
2001	Dragons of Magic	J. Robert King	320	ISBN 0-7869-1872-1
2002	The Secrets of Magic	J. Robert King	320	ISBN 0-7869-2710-0
2003	Monsters of Magic	J. Robert King	320	ISBN 0-7869-2983-9

== Others ==
Category	Year	Title	Author	Publisher	Pages	ISBN
Graphic novels	1999	Gerrard's Quest	Mike Grell, Pop Mhan, Norman Le	Dark Horse Comics	112	ISBN 1-56971-403-7
Novel compilations	2009	Artifacts Cycle I	J. Robert King, Jeff Grubb	Wizards of the Coast	720	ISBN 0-7869-5305-5
Novel compilations	2009	Artifacts Cycle II	Lynn Abbey, J. Robert King, Loren L. Coleman	Wizards of the Coast	768	ISBN 0-7869-5306-3
Web comic compilations	2010	Path of the Planeswalker	Doug Beyer, Brady Dommermuth, Jenna Helland	Wizards of the Coast	192	ISBN 0-7869-5367-5
Web comic compilations	2011	Path of the Planeswalker II	Doug Beyer, Brady Dommermuth, Jenna Helland	Wizards of the Coast	160	ISBN 0-7869-5852-9
Web comic compilations	2012	Magic the Gathering: Vol. 1	Matt Forbeck, Martin Coccolo	IDW Publishing	104	N/A (eBook)
Web comic compilations	2012	Magic the Gathering: Vol. 2 - The Spell Thief	Matt Forbeck, Martin Coccolo, Christian Duce, Dan Scott	IDW Publishing	104	N/A (eBook)

=== The Planeswalker's Guide Series ===
The Planeswalker's Guide Series was a planned series of novels which were to start with A Planeswalker's Guide to Alara in September 2008. Each novel was going to contain information, concept art, card art, etc... about the plane it is dedicated to. The series was later changed to web article series after the first book did not sell as well as the publisher hoped.

Year	Title	Author	Pages	ISBN
2008	A Planeswalker's Guide to Alara	Doug Beyer, Jenna Helland	160	ISBN 0-7869-5124-9

== Notes ==
General

- "Magic: The Gathering Novels". Wizards of the Coast. Archived from the original on September 22, 2012.
- "Magic: The Gathering eBooks". Wizards of the Coast. Archived from the original on September 22, 2012.
- "Magic: The Gathering Graphic Novels". Wizards of the Coast. Archived from the original on September 22, 2012.
- "Magic: The Gathering Graphic Comics". Wizards of the Coast. Archived from the original on August 28, 2008.

Specific

== See also ==
- Magic: The Gathering Card Sets
- Magic: The Gathering Storylines
