= Multiverse (Magic: The Gathering) =

Fictional universe

The Multiverse is the shared fictional universe depicted on Magic: The Gathering cards, novels, comics, and other supplemental products. Though Magic is a strategy game, an intricate storyline underlies the cards released in each expansion. On the cards, elements of this multiverse are shown in the card art and through quotations and descriptions on the bottom of most cards (called flavor text). Novels and anthologies published by HarperPrism and Wizards of the Coast (WOTC), and the comic books published by Armada Comics expand upon the settings and characters hinted at on the cards. WOTC also publishes a weekly story (most often related to the plane explored in the current expansion set) in the Magic Fiction column, previously known as Official Magic Fiction and Uncharted Realms.

In the early days of the game, the name 'Dominia' was used to describe the story multiverse, but due to confusion with the name of the plane/planet where the central events of Magic occur (Dominaria, which means "the Song of Dominia"), it fell into disuse and was replaced.

== Publication history ==
=== Creative origins ===
The way Magic storylines are conceived and deployed has changed considerably over the years. The main premise of Magic is that countless possible worlds (planes) exist in the Multiverse, and rare beings called Planeswalkers are uniquely capable of traversing the Multiverse without external aid. This allows the game to frequently change worlds so as to renew its mechanical inspiration while maintaining Planeswalkers as recurrent, common elements across worlds. Players represent Planeswalkers able to draw on the magic and entities of these planes to do battle with others.

Richard Garfield established enough of this story for the game when it was first published. With the first sets, most of this story was told through the cards' flavor text, and because most of the creatures and the keywords were based on common fantasy tropes (flying dragons, for example), there was no significant driver for a backing narrative. In some cases, the narrative was demanded to help with new gameplay mechanics and keywords that did not fit standard fantasy tropes, but these were still limited to flavor text. The first expansion Arabian Nights (1994), designed by Garfield, was based on One Thousand and One Nights folklore and included figures from that such as Aladdin.

=== Pre-revision era ===
With the demand for more expansions, several different teams within Wizards of the Coast's research and development department worked separately on these upcoming sets, with the card designers taking the lead in creating their narratives. Each of these teams had different approaches for implementing that in the cards. For example, the next expansion was Antiquities (1994), with a design led by Skaff Elias. Elias' team wanted this set to focus on the use of colorless artifacts and came up with the narrative idea of a battle between two brothers skilled in artifact use at a point in time before the other realms of magic had established themselves. This would tie into both their planned cards as well as help define the differences between the color mana schools better. Elias planned out elaborate timelines, but as the set was only 100 cards, most of this was left on paper, giving players only glimpses of the larger picture through flavor text. In the case of Homelands (1995), R&D had two writers craft a story first and then worked alongside them to implement that into the cards for that set. Still, few elements of any of these sets were shared save for the common connection to the plane of Dominaria.

Apart from Wizards' own attempts at storytelling, in 1994, Wizards gave exclusive licenses to Harper Prism to publish novels, and an imprint of Acclaim Entertainment to Armada Comics to publish comic books. Neither of these was developed in concert with the game and subsequently created divergent ideas to the game. "Much of the lore established" by Armada Comics "is the foundation from which the rest of continuity was built. In fact, the idea of 'The Revision' stemmed in part from WotC publishing novels based loosely on many of the stories told in these comics. Some of the details changed (or were 'retconned', in popular fan speak), but for the most part, the core of these stories stayed the same". The comics came to a sudden end in 1996 when Acclaim, parent company of Armada Comics, started to run into financial trouble. In 1997, "two video games connected to the comics, Shandalar and Battlemage, were also released [...]. In general, Pre-Revisionist materials are still canon unless contradicted by another source".

=== Pre-mending era ===
Wizards began to take back narrative control with the Mirage (1996) storyline. "Detailed story summaries for Mirage and Visions were available on the Wizards website, covering the events of the Mirage War. But it was with Weatherlight that Magic's first epic narrative began". Wizards wanted to try to create a more cohesive universe with the next major expansion, Weatherlight (1997), comparable to other works like Star Wars. Mark Rosewater and Michael G. Ryan developed a long-term story arc that would cross through several expansions as well as into comics, magazines, and novels. With the cards, a small team of dedicated writers was used to make sure there was a consistent voice in the flavor text to help emphasize the story elements. "The next four years, from Tempest in 1997 through Apocalypse in 2001, would follow the story of the legendary Skyship Weatherlight and her crew". This saga was intended to last the next five years, but several factors came into play by the time the Urza's block was released: there was a change in leadership in oversight of Magic: The Gathering and the direction it was heading, players were not interested in the lead characters of the saga, and players had found it difficult to follow the narrative from the cards alone.

In 1998, a new four-issue limited comic series was published by Dark Horse. Around the same time, Wizards had regained control on the license to publish novels and comics and they decided to make the novels the primary route for the story of Magic: The Gathering which would tie in closely with the cards designed for the expansion. This approach was used through the Onslaught block in 2003, after which Wizards found that novels were not a sufficient means to build out the details for cards; novels would be focused on how characters change over events, while the game presented a character at a single moment, and a novel could not flesh out all the other supporting elements that the card designers needed to build their sets without weighing down the readers.

Following Onslaught, the narrative of Magic: The Gathering took a more distanced approach. Once an idea for an expansion was presented, preliminary work was done simultaneously by the research and development team and by the creative staff to build out the basic gameplay concepts and the setting of that expansion, respectively. Once both sides agreed to that, the two teams then proceeded primarily on individual routes towards their end production. Brady Dommermuth, the Creative Director in 2006, said that "generally the cards provide the world in which the novels are set, and the novels sometimes provide characters represented on cards. But cards also introduce their own characters that might not appear in the novels. In short, the Magic creative team and the novelists work largely in parallel and inform each other as much as possible."

=== Post-mending era ===
The pre-mending and post-mending monikers come "from the event known as the Mending, which fundamentally changed the nature of Planeswalkers from near-divine beings to mortals with a bit more oomph". During this time, Wizards further transitioned to ebooks as well as having their creative staff write more in "Uncharted Realms", a weekly column on the company's website. In September 2011, Hasbro and IDW Publishing accorded to make a four-issue mini-series about Magic: The Gathering with a new story but heavily based on MTG elements and with a new Planeswalker called Dack Fayden, the story of which mainly developed in the planes of Ravnica and Innistrad. In total, between 2011 and 2014, four four-issue mini-series were published by IDW. In 2013, Wizards saw that even with continued growth in player numbers, printed novel sales had fallen greatly and ebook sales remained flat, and made the decision to discontinue the larger narrative works in favor of having the creative team provide story coverage and shipments as of the "Uncharted Realms" column.

In 2014, Mark Rosewater wrote: "Unfortunately, the public has made it very clear that novels are not how they want the story told". Clayton Emery, on why he no longer writes Magic: The Gathering novels, wrote that after being invited to Gen Con he "arrived to find waiting for me — nothing. […] No reading, no panels, no chance to meet fans, and not a single copy of any of my books anywhere in sight. Why did you invite me? […] While there, I did get to ask, […] Will you guys promote my work? 'No. If you catch fire with the fans, then we'll promote you.' How do I catch fire with the fans if you don't promote my work? 'Who knows? We don't promote Magic books as a rule anyway, because they don't sell well.' Then why produce them? And hey, you promoted Jeff Grubb's latest Magic book, advertising it on the inside front cover of every DC comic for three months during one summer. 'Oh, sure. His books sell.'" Sam Keeper, for CoolStuffInc, wrote "I can't attest to the accuracy of Emery's recollections, but it certainly feels familiar. […] None of the ebook releases, to my knowledge, have ever been acknowledged by official accounts, aside from that single link to an incomplete list on mtgstory.com. […] Nonetheless, it's a bit of a self-fulfilling prophecy to not promote a product, and then conclude that there simply isn't an audience for it".

This approach continued through 2017. Then, Wizards of the Coast hired novelist and scriptwriter Nic Kelman as their Head of Story and Entertainment. Kelman's task was to assemble all of the lore established from previous card sets and the published novels, comics, and other materials to create the game's "cosmology" or the story bible that established all the known planes and elements of those planes, the individual Planeswalkers and their connections to others, and other details that they could be passed not only to the teams developing new cards but also to those expanding the franchise with new novels and other content. This allows for highly connected events between the external media and the game; one example established the death of a major Planeswalker in the novel War of the Spark: Ravnica that was published just prior to the release of the new set War of the Spark, the first novel published by Wizards in several years, with the set containing cards referencing that death.

In 2018, as part of MTG's 25th anniversary, IDW began publishing another four-issue comic mini-series—this time centered around the Planeswalker Chandra Nalaar. In 2018, Kelman said:

In the early days of Magic storytelling, there wasn't necessarily a lot of communication between different storytellers, nor was there much long-term planning about where Magic story might be in 2, 5, or 10 years. Over the years, we've been trying to make the story more consistent in tone and voice, make the Multiverse more consistent from a cosmological perspective, and plan out stories and character appearances further in advance. In terms of emphasis, I think the early days were less about characters and more about lore. Magic has been trying to emphasize characters more and more over the years. […] We've embarked on the very exciting effort to gain the same reputation for fantasy fiction that Magic has for fantasy art. To that end, we're now hiring first-class, globally recognized fantasy authors to write our web fiction. […] On the micro level, we try to make sure every story has at least one character who new fans can relate to without needing to know years of history and at least one character who established fans know and love. On the macro level, we try to plan out sets, settings, and stories so, over the course of any given year, there's going to be something for everyone.

In September 2019, the sequel Chandra comic series was cancelled before publication. In November 2019, War of the Spark: Forsaken (2019) was widely panned and Wizards of the Coast "canceled plans for the book that was intended for the game's next set, Theros: Beyond Death. Then in 2020, with the Zendikar Rising (2020) set, the Magic storyline returned via story articles on the official website. A new ongoing comic series began in 2021; the first issue went "for a third printing despite it already being the highest selling Magic comic book in history".

== Cosmology ==
In the lore of Magic the gathering the Multiverse is a collection of planes (described somewhat like pocket universes) which are usually named after the primary planet contained within them. Travel between these planes is possible, and a few powerful beings known as "Planeswalkers" are capable of traversing between them at will.

=== The Blind Eternities ===
The Blind Eternities is the term more commonly used to describe the space between the planes of reality. Filled with chaotic, raw energies such as Aether, Mana, and temporal energy, it is a place where matter and life as known within the planes of reality cannot subsist. (The only exceptions are the Planeswalkers, who briefly pass physically through it when they "walk" between planes.) As such, not much is known or understood about the Blind Eternities. Unfathomable, reality-warping cosmic horrors known as the Eldrazi are said to be born there. The 2025 set Edge of Eternities is set in an outer space-like region outside of the Blind Eternities.

=== Aether ===
Aether (previously spelled Æther) is the main type of energy filling the blind eternities, although it can also appear in variable quantities within the planes. It is inextricably associated with magic within Magic's shared fictional universe and the use of the word in several Magic cards implies that casting magic involves channeling and manipulating Aether. Similarly, "summoning" the creatures around which combat and much of gameplay in Magic revolves is described as "pulling (them) from the Aether".

=== Dominaria ===
The majority of the Magic story was set on the plane of Dominaria prior to Mirrodin, encompassing long time periods each detailed in certain card sets or books. Dominaria is a unique nexus between all the other planes of the Multiverse. Occasionally, such as in Time Spiral, the storyline returns to it.

== Storylines ==
In explaining the game and lore of Magic: The Gathering in an article in Popular Mechanics, Darren Orf explains that each expansion set of MTG "tells a cohesive story across those sets. [...] Each new world comes with all its own themes, strife, magic, and complications. While some elements carry throughout each block (Planeswalkers can cross into other realms after all) and Magic game designers often returns to past favorites, every block is mostly a new story to hook new players while keeping Magic veterans interested". Chronologically, the storylines include:

- The Thran: The Thran were an ancient civilization of master artificers who were destroyed by Yawgmoth and his Phyrexians (converted Thran following him) during the Thran-Phyrexian War about 5,000 years before the Brothers. They are only hinted at in the game, but J. Robert King's novel The Thran explores their culture in some depth.
- The Brothers' War: War between Urza and Mishra, two brothers who were trained by the archaeologist and artificer Tocasia in creating magical devices based on ancient Thran technology. As their powers grew, so did their enmity, eventually erupting in an all-out war utilizing powerful constructs. Marshalling vast armies aided by their impressive machines (some of the old Thran Empire, some newly made) the brothers staged a series of battles. The war devastated the land of Terisiare on the plane of Dominaria and culminated in a world-devastating climax on the island of Argoth. This caused the Dark, climate changes which led to the Fall of the Sarpadian Empires and finally to the Ice Age. This story is the basis for the Antiquities expansion and later the Urza's Saga Block.
- The Dark: The devastation wrought by the Brothers led to the fall of many civilizations and the beginning of a Dark Age in Dominaria. The destruction of Argoth caused a nuclear winter that would later lead to the Dominarian Ice Age. This story is portrayed in the Fallen Empires and The Dark expansions. In this age, Terisiare's survivors were bitterly opposed to magic. Tiny, insular villages dotted a wasted, goblin-infested landscape. Fanatical priests controlled a few powerful city-states. Preachers and witch-hunters hunted the countryside for the few remaining wizards. Despite this oppression, it is during this era that mortal wizards first discover the five-color nature of magic. This story is fully explained in the novel The Gathering Dark by Jeff Grubb. The following Ice Age is detailed in Eternal Ice and The Shattered Alliance, also by Jeff Grubb.
- Fallen Empires: The harsh climatic changes that followed the destruction of Argoth caused the southern continent, Sarpadia, to struggle for survival. The elves and humans of Sarpadia begin breeding primitive but adaptable subspecies: saprolings and thrulls, respectively. These creatures soon turn on their creators and terrorize the people of Sarpadia, while the Merfolk suffered an invasion of crustacean-like homarids, which benefitted from the cooling oceans. Barraged by invading orcs, goblins, homarids, thrulls, and even fungus, the civilizations of Sarpadia are destroyed, and the continent falls into darkness.
- The Ice Age: The climate-altering effects of the devastation continued, leading to a global ice age. New empires rose and fought in the cold. Eventually, this cooling climate was reversed and life returned to normal. This story is portrayed in the Ice Age, Alliances, and Coldsnap expansions, and in the novels Eternal Ice and Shattered Alliance by Jeff Grubb. Jeff Grubb also wrote a short story "continuing" the story for Coldsnap, which is located in the Player's Guide insert you can find in a Coldsnap Fat Pack.
- The Homelands: This short interlude depicts the decimated plane of Ulgrotha, in which many civilizations struggle for power against Baron Sengir, a powerful vampire who has manipulated a number of other characters into serving his ends. The Planeswalkers Serra and Feroz turn the balance in favor of the light, but are killed in battle against a crazed alien Planeswalker. The story has no concrete ending.
- Jamuraa: The story concerns three of the most powerful nations of Jamuraa (a tropical continent)—the militaristic kingdom of the Zhalfirins, the religious state of Femeref, and the trading province of the Suq'Ata empire. Zhalfir was the warrior nation, based mainly on red. Femeref was mainly white, and featured clerics and healers, while the seafaring traders of Suq'Ata were mostly blue. Mirage concerned these three nations and their struggle against the evil wizard Kaervek. Kaervek has imprisoned the powerful wizard and diplomat Mangara in an amber prison and the bulk of the story details the Jamuraans attempting to free Mangara. In addition to these events, the Planeswalker Teferi has caused his island to disappear from existence for almost 200 years. It is the phasing of the entire island that led Kaervek and Mangara to Jamuraa in the first place.
- The Phyrexian Invasion: After millennia of peace, the machine-like Phyrexians, who originate from a hellish mechanical world, invade the world of Dominaria led by the former Thran Yawgmoth from the pocket universe of Rath. The Phyrexian invasion divides into many sub-stories.
  - The Urza Saga: Following the destruction of Argoth, Urza becomes a Planeswalker and foresees the invasion of Dominaria. Urza's travels lead the war to the peaceful universe of Serra's realm which is destroyed by Phyrexian armies; survivors of the plane flee to Dominaria and Ulgrotha. In preparation for the invasion, Urza creates the Tolarian academy, research, and development laboratory school in which he and other mighty wizards train mages for the upcoming invasion and experiment on weaponry development, time travel, and genetic manipulation in hopes of creating a defensive army. The time experiments lead to a temporal collapse and the academy becomes laced with time fractures, which are both dangerous and useful to the inhabitants. Urza himself develops a fearful Legacy Weapon and Karn, a self-aware golem which, combined, can defeat any foe. This story arc is linked to The Thran, Antiquities, The Dark, Ice Age, and Homelands and is depicted in the books The Brothers War, Planeswalker and Time Streams.
  - The Legacy: This follows the travels of many brave adventurers from all across Dominaria who, aboard Urza's vessel "The Weatherlight", seek to collect the different artifacts left by Urza and necessary to assemble the Legacy Weapon. As opposed to them, many Phyrexian allies or lords will try to stop them from their quest. This story arc is the longest in the Magic continuity, and its characters are depicted in the Weatherlight, Tempest, Stronghold, Exodus, Mercadian Masques, and Nemesis card sets; later, the story continues and concludes in the Invasion arc.
  - Prophecy: Parallel to the "Legacy" history, and following the Mirage and Urza's Saga histories, in Dominaria the warrior kingdom of Keld ensues war all across Jamuraa. Many wizards from the Tolarian academy aid the federation of Jamuraa and succeed in stopping the Keldons' warmongering.
  - The Invasion: The dreaded Phyrexians finally come to Dominaria across many "planar portals" and Urza, who has been spending thousands of years planning a defense against the Invasion, implements his plans. The Weatherlight leads the Dominarian forces, but the widespread chaos, and the uncompromising nature of Urza's tactics, threaten to destroy the plane. The arrival of Yawgmoth himself leads to the Apocalypse, but he is finally defeated by the fully assembled Legacy Weapon. The Invasion itself occurs in the Invasion block but is linked to all previous story arcs. From this point on, the publishers switch to a series of self-contained plotlines with occasional links to older stories, rather than sweeping epics spanning years of card releases.
- Odyssey: One hundred years after the devastation of the Invasion, Dominaria was still rebuilding. This part of the story took place in Otaria, a devastated continent that was the place least affected by the Invasion. It centered on Kamahl, a barbarian, and his quest to get the Mirari, a magical orb of seemingly endless power.
  - Onslaught: Having acquired the Mirari with devastating effects, Kamahl renounces it and tries to be rid of it, but the events he triggered have gone far beyond his control. The story shifts to a battle between Akroma, an angel, and Phage, Kamahl's corrupted sister, who kills with a touch. As zealous armies gather behind each of them, Kamahl needs to end their escalating conflict before Otaria itself is decimated. To this end, he recovered the slumbering Mirari and allies himself with three ancient gods who have been waiting for these events to happen again. This story is linked to Mirrodin and sets the scene for the first major storyline not set in Dominaria.
- Mirrodin: The story of Mirrodin takes place on a new, metal world, created by the Planeswalker Karn and populated by races stolen from other worlds. Glissa, an elf, and her allies strive to assemble the mythical Kaldra, so that they can defeat the crazed Memnarch, who lives inside the hollow world. All the while, we learn about the history of Mirrodin, and its loose, but nonetheless present, connection to previous storylines based on Dominaria. The Mirrodin story is the first of the new year-long, three-set story arcs, having started in 2003 with the release of Moons of Mirrodin and continuing with 2004's The Darksteel Eye and The Fifth Dawn.
- The Kami War: The plane of Kamigawa is naturally divided into two: the Kakuriyo Kami world (spirit world) and the Utsushiyo material world; both working and operating harmoniously until the Kami began to attack the material world twenty years before the story opens. The books follow the lone samurai Toshiro Umezawa and the princess Michiko as they try to bring peace to Kamigawa. As well as giving the game an unusual, strong Oriental feel, this storyline is interesting in that the designers deliberately tried to give the story a strong influence over the game itself. Instead of relying on the traditional "color wheel" conflict (the game of Magic: the Gathering is based on a five-point circle of allied and enemy color affiliations), the color of any given card may often be less important than whether it has a Kami or Material theme.
- Ravnica: Ravnica is a plane covered almost entirely in the cityscape. The city's ten "guilds", political organizations each based on a different two-color mana pairing, warred for a long period of time. After the conflict, a magical document, the Guildpact, was created to ensure that the plane remained at peace and that the guilds would constrain themselves to their social roles. The main storyline begins 9,999 years later, as anticipation of the decimillennial anniversary builds. The once-noble guilds have corrupted and decayed over time, and a great political gridlock is all that keeps Ravnica stable. A series of protagonists—most notably Agrus Kos, a law enforcement officer from the Boros League, and Teysa Karlov, a lawmage from the Orzhov Syndicate, uncover the plots of the various guildmasters, as well as the ambitions of the "secret guild", House Dimir. The flavor of the cards again exerted considerable influence over the mechanics of the game, encouraging players to build decks devoted to a particular guild.
- Time Spiral: The Time Spiral block returns to a post-apocalyptic Dominaria. Teferi, a Planeswalker, abandoned Urza during the Phyrexian Invasion by "phasing" (temporarily removed from reality) two landmasses known as Shiv and Zhalfir out. He returns to Dominaria to find it in a state of ruin. In addition to having been almost totally devastated by the Apocalypse, mysterious "time rifts" have opened in the skies across the plane, making planeswalking and spellcasting more difficult. Teferi wants to ensure that Zhalfir and Shiv return to Dominaria safely—however, the time rifts, and the considerably deteriorated state of the plane itself, means that the two continents no longer "fit." Should Zhalfir and Shiv land, Dominaria and the entire Multiverse would be destroyed. The Time Spiral block was billed as Magic's nostalgia block and would revisit themes and characters from every storyline up to the end of the Otaria arc. As the Invasion did before, the Time Spiral story is linked to any other story arc before it, harkening back to many earlier settings and characters, even those outside of Dominaria. It was during this block that The Mending occurred, greatly reducing the powers of all Planeswalkers.
- Lorwyn: Whereas most blocks consist of three sets, it was decided to turn the 2007/08 block into two mini-blocks of two sets each. The focus of the first is the plane of Lorwyn, an idyllic, perpetually sunlit world populated by a wide variety of civilized species. These tribes are generally peaceful but keen to keep to themselves. The story centers around an elf outcast named Rhys who has triggered a series of events foreseen by his mentor, Colfenor, and a flamekin pilgrim named Ashling who believes her path and Rhys's are the same. The coming Aurora, an annual event when the plane darkens and lights appear in the sky, is the key to whatever it is that Rhys needs to do.
  - Shadowmoor: Rather than passing harmlessly as it normally does, the Aurora instead transforms Lorwyn into an eerie reflection of itself. The idyllic, sunlit world is replaced by the shadows and omnipresent malice of Shadowmoor. Landscapes, races, and even individuals become twisted alternatives with no indication that their Lorwyn selves ever existed. Ashling, now known as the Extinguisher, has a central role in this shift, and it falls to Rhys (an elvish hero in this place) and Maralen, a mysterious elf and one of the very few unchanged by the transformation, to discover why.
- Alara: The plane of Alara was shattered long ago by an unknown force; it is now split unequally into five unique shards, each having no knowledge of the others. Each shard was denied two of the five colors of magic by the event (the inhabitants of each shard have had no recollection of the missing two colors of mana for centuries), and have evolved around their remaining three: The militant, feudal, sun-dappled plane of Bant; the scientific, order-obsessed, windy and cloud covered plane of Esper; the desperate, lifeless, blackened plane of Grixis; the violent, harsh, volcanic plane of Jund; and the green, lush, stampeding plane of Naya. Many species die off, evolve, or border extinction in each shard due to insufficient mana sustenance (Zombies can't survive without black mana, angels can't survive without white mana, etc.), and others thrived. The force that shattered the plane is unknown but believed to be the five-headed hydra Progenitus (for unknown reasons) who disappears at the shattering of the plane and reappears in the expansion "Alara—Conflux" when the shards are reunited.
  - Conflux: As the Shards of Alara draw closer together, the millennia-long machinations of a hidden evil come closer to bearing a dire harvest. Nicol Bolas, once one of the most powerful Planeswalkers, has been manipulating the civilizations of Alara for his own reasons. As the shards violently collide with each other after centuries apart, war erupts on all sides, and in the chaos, Bolas seeks to harness the power of the Maelstrom, the chaotic center of the plane where all five colors come together in a magical storm of unimaginable energies and power. The Planeswalker Elspeth Tirel and the valiant knight Rafiq start to catch wind of an insidious plot and begin investigating.
- Zendikar: A new plane is introduced: Zendikar, a world with powerful, uncontrollable mana and many dangerous features, including the Roil. Planeswalkers are drawn to Zendikar because of its powerful mana. Many of Zendikar's residents must fight against the land itself as mountains become alive and forests move. It is revealed that thousands of years ago three Planeswalkers locked powerful, unstoppable beings known as the Eldrazi in a complex prison on Zendikar, causing the plane's complex problems. When three more Planeswalkers enter the prison, the Eldrazi are released and start destroying Zendikar as they cannot escape from the plane.
- Scars of Mirrodin: As the storyline returns to the metallic plane of Mirrodin, it is found divided. A corrupted Karn has returned and brought with him the rot of Phyrexia. As the world faces off, Mirran versus Phyrexian, the idyllic plane is brought to a new form. This set also marked a deviation from the five-color wheel, instead pushing players to align their decks to the Mirran or Phyrexian side of the conflict; to reinforce this, they created a website devoted to the war where the player can switch between sides. In February 2011, it was announced that Phyrexia had won, and the set New Phyrexia played out as a war amongst five Praetors of Phyrexia, battling each other for dominance.
- Innistrad: A new plane is introduced: Innistrad, set in a gothic-themed world, where vampires, werewolves, and demons run rampant. Before the events of the block, the human population of Innistrad was constantly beset by supernatural creatures. In response, the Planeswalker Sorin created the arch-angel Avacyn to protect the humans. Avacyn set out to eradicate all of Innistrad's demons, leading to an epic battle against the elder demon, Griselbrand. During the battle, Griselbrand was able to trick Avacyn into locking both beings in the magical prison known as the Helvault. With Avacyn gone, the angel's protection disappeared and soon creatures of darkness were free to prey on mankind once more. When Sorin finds out about this he goes straight to Innistrad (presumably from Zendikar) to see what can be done. While he is searching for Avacyn, Liliana Vess is there searching for Griselbrand so she can slay him and release herself from their bargain for Liliana's soul. Liliana discovers the Hellvault and releases Griselbrand and Avacyn. Liliana slays Griselbrand, and Avacyn's restored powers guard humanity from the zombies, werewolves, and dangers of Innistrad.
- Return to Ravnica: Returning to the megalopolis of Ravnica, the guilds have been in a state of constant warfare ever since the events of Dissension, when the Guildpact was dissolved. The Izzet League's guild leader Niv-Mizzet discovers a maze passing through the Tenth District of the city. He sets his entire guild on figuring out the point of this "Implicit Maze". It is learned later in the story that the being who traverses the maze will become the Ruler of Ravnica. Niv-Mizzet makes an announcement all over the city of Ravnica, asking all guilds to send a champion to run the maze. The Planeswalker Jace Beleren solves the mystery of the maze and lauds himself as the Living Guildpact, settling disputes for the ten guilds.
- Theros: On a new plane, Theros, based on the heroes, myths, and monsters of Ancient Greece, Elspeth arrives and is declared the Champion of the sun god, Heliod. The Planeswalker Xenagos becomes the God of Revels, angering the established pantheon of the other Gods. Heliod gives Elspeth the Godsend, a sword with which to slay Xenagos. Ajani Goldmane, another Planeswalker, helps Elspeth to kill Xenagos. Meanwhile, the Planeswalker Kiora is searching the seas of Theros for something that will help to defeat the Eldrazi that will inevitably eventually destroy the Multiverse. The merfolk begin to worship Kiora, mistaking her for Thassa, the God of the Sea. At this point, all of the Gods of Theros are very angry at the Planeswalkers. After Elspeth kills Xenagos, Heliod takes the Godsend and kills Elspeth with it, sending Elspeth to the underworld of Theros. Ajani is angered and stays on Theros looking for a way to get even with the Gods.
- Khans of Tarkir: A new plane (Tarkir) is the setting of this block. Tarkir is the homeworld of Sarkhan Vol, a Planeswalker known for an obsession with dragons, and the five warring clans, each aligned towards 3 colours. The Mardu (RWB), The Abzan (WBG), The Jeskai (URW), The Sultai (BGU) and the Temur (GUR). All dragons have gone extinct on Tarkir, hunted to extinction by the 5 clans many years ago, but Sarkhan returns to find the source of the voice within his mind. The Planeswalker Sorin also comes to Tarkir where he discovers that Ugin, one of the Planeswalkers that helped to seal the Eldrazi on Zendikar, has died many years ago. Sorin leaves Tarkir saddened by this loss. With the help of the Jeskai leader Narset, Sarkhan makes his way to the resting place of Ugin and travels back in time through the Nexus (the remains of Ugin form this Nexus) but not before he sees Narset killed by Zurgo Helmsmasher, Khan of the Mardu.
  - Fate Reforged: Sarkhan travels through the Nexus 1000 years into the past and discovers the world of Tarkir before the fall of the Dragons. He discovers that the Dragons are formed within great tempests and that these tempests are powered by Ugin himself. He arrives in time to see Ugin confront his nemesis Nicol Bolas, Sarkhan's old master (although at this point in time Nicol Bolas had not met Sarkhan yet). Sarkhan sees Nicol Bolas kill Ugin and leave Tarkir, leaving Sarkhan distraught that he could not save the great Dragon. Using the power of the Hedron he had recovered from Zendikar, Sarkhan encases Ugin within a cocoon of Hedrons and seals him away to save his life. This act changes the future history of Tarkir, as with Ugin still alive the Dragon Tempests would never end, preventing the humans from hunting the Dragons into extinction. Due to his actions changing his own past, Sarkhan is pulled from the past Tarkir and back into the present.
  - Dragons of Tarkir: Sarkhan returns to the present day Tarkir to find the Dragons have survived and now live together with the humans. Although the 5 clans still clash with each other, they are now led by the powerful Dragon Lords instead of the human Khans of Sarkhan's own past. He sees many people he knew from his own timeline, however, none of them remember him and all have changed as Sarkhan's actions have influenced this new Tarkir. Sarkhan travels again to the resting place of Ugin and discovers the revived Elder Dragon is gone. He cannot sense Ugin's power in his plane but takes refuge in the fact that Ugin is safe. Sarkhan then goes to find Narset where he discovers his old friend has now left the confines of the Dragons Clans and has learnt the secret history of Tarkir, including the history of Sarkhan himself. We also learn that Narset's spark has ignited and she has become a Planeswalker. We leave the pair on Tarkir, neither of them intending to leave for a long time, with too much to see and learn upon the reinvigorated plane of Tarkir.
- Battle for Zendikar: The set picks up the storyline of Zendikar where the released Eldrazi devastate the plane. Ulamog, one of the 3 released Eldrazi titans, slowly consumes the land itself. The Zendikari population either flees or unites their strength to fight the Eldrazi together under the leadership of the Planeswalker Gideon Jura. Gideon also convinces Jace on Ravnica to help Zendikar. Jace agrees, also since he is partly responsible for releasing the Eldrazi from their prison. He is convinced that the hedrons and leylines of the plane are the keys to imprisoning the Eldrazi once again. The Planeswalker Nissa with her unique connection to the plane itself and Kiora, with the weapon she stole from Thassa on Theros, joins the fight as well. With joint forces, the Planeswalker and the Zendikari build a trap of aligned hedrons. For a moment they can imprison Ulamog again, but they were sabotaged by the reignited Demon Planeswalker Ob Nixilis who frees Ulamog, seeking revenge on Nissa and destruction of the plane he despises. He awakens Kozilek as well leaving the Plane with two ravaging Eldazi titans.
- Shadows over Innistrad: The denizens of Innistrad are beset on all sides. Their faith in the archangel Avacyn brought them strength when fighting against demons, werewolves, vampires, and all manners of horrors. But, now the mighty protector of the plane has been twisted into something monstrous by an outside influence. A very familiar force has stepped into the gothic world, and its corrupting tendrils now touch everything. The next set, Eldritch Moon, focuses on the fact that Emrakul, the most powerful Eldrazi titan who had been missing from the Battle for Zendikar storyline, is now on Innistrad. Together, the Gatewatch must find a way to save the plane from Emrakul's influence. This story also focuses on cosmic horror instead of the traditional gothic horror of old Innistrad.
- Kaladesh: The Gatewatch goes to Chandra Nalaar's home world, the titular plane of Kaladesh, where she finds her mother (presumed dead) and almost kills Tezzeret. Tezzeret later kidnaps Rashmi, winner of the famous Inventor's Fair, and begins a dastardly plot to control the ruling Consulate. With the Consulate imprisoning inventors and confiscating their devices following the Fair, tensions between the populace and the government reach a boiling point, as depicted in Aether Revolt. The block focuses on a Steampunk aesthetic, with the steam replaced by the powerful material aether.
- Amonkhet: The Gatewatch set out to destroy the evil dragon Planeswalker Nicol Bolas after learning of his dominion over the titular desert plane Amonkhet. In the desert, they find a city (Naktamun) teeming with food, water, and life, ruled by five gods, with Bolas seemingly absent altogether. The people of Naktamun train their entire lives to die in ritual combat, hoping to experience pure bliss in the afterlife when the God-Pharaoh (Bolas) returns to Amonkhet. In Hour of Devastation, Bolas returns as prophesied, only to raze Naktamun and reveal the true purpose of the training and combat: to create an army of physically perfect and combat-adept mummies to serve as an unquestionably loyal army. The block's setting is based on ancient Egypt, with themes of social hierarchy and contrast between life and death.
- Ixalan: The plane is home to four primary tribes, each with distinct synergies and advantages that draw off of one another. As for the tale: the golden city of Orazca, buried deep in the jungle, houses a great secret. The immortal sun, an artifact of immense power, is hidden there. Now, that secret has become known. The great forces of the plane gather to combat one another in a contest to see who will claim the mighty prize. The merfolk River Heralds, the vampiric Legion of Dusk, the Brazen Coalition of pirates, and the Sun Empire's dinosaur riders all meet in open conflict to decide the fate of their world.
- Dominaria: A return to the place of so many of Magic: The Gathering's storylines in celebration of the game's 25th anniversary.

=== Additional plots ===
There are numerous other smaller plots and subplots that take place in Dominaria and on the many planes of the multiverse of Dominia as well as events after the invasion of Dominaria by the Phyrexians.

- The sets from Weatherlight up to Apocalypse follow the epic story arc of the crew of the airship Weatherlight, their trek across several planes, and their ultimate role in defending Dominaria from the Phyrexian invasion.
- The sets from Odyssey to Scourge, set in the era of upheaval after the Invasion, involve the Dominarian continent of Otaria and the struggle between various factions for the powerful artifact known as the Mirari.
- The sets from Mirrodin to Fifth Dawn are set in the world of Mirrodin, where artificial and natural life are inseparably entwined.
- Several Magic: The Gathering video games have their own storylines and worlds.
- Starting with The Mending during Time Spiral, many of the stories revolve around the newly created, de-powered Planeswalkers. These characters recur in multiple sets, and may receive reprints or entirely new cards in new sets.

== Reception ==
In 2016, Cameron Kunzelman, for Paste, highlighted the Kaladesh storyline and wrote: "This might be the appropriate time to say that the Kaladesh leans very hard into the visual stylings of a fantastical, pre-colonial India (as one of the set's key characters, Saheeli Rai, might suggest). While I can't speak to how successful they have been at synthesizing the cultural references with the fantasy elements, my general impression is that the gesture toward Indian culture is just that: a vague gesture. I've yet to see a card that really felt like it “landed” in that cultural space. At the same time, Magic has gotten better and better at melding the mechanical elements of the game with the narrative ones, and Kaladesh is the best that this current formation of the company has done so far".

In 2018, Kunzelman, for Kotaku, highlighted a card from 1993 that was reprinted as part of the 25th anniversary — the newer card now has an elaboration on how it connects to the Planeswalker, Liliana Vess. Kunzelman wrote: "This is the smallest trickle of narrative, literally buried at the bottom of a card, and yet it allows a player who is familiar with the game to grasp onto it and get a huge amount of new contextual information about the world [...]. It's a really great touch that makes a world that we access through card stock feel like it is a living, breathing world with its own mythology that we've been living in for the past 25 years. That's the real selling point of this kind of contextual storytelling on collectable cards for me. [...] This story, appearing on the bottom of a card and giving a whole new dimension to a narrative I'm already familiar with, sells me on the idea that all the pieces matter. Each card is a piece of a larger world, and I'm supposed to pay attention to them and connect them up like breadcrumbs".

Aidan Moher, for Tor.com, wrote "Magic's storytelling has come a long way from its early days. It's no longer a plain fantasy world filled with generic tchotchkes and epic fantasy tropes. It's grown into something way bigger and more expansive than Richard Garfield, the game's creator could have ever imagined. Magic was my gateway into fantasy—and as an adult, I'm stilled thrilled by its ever-expanding world. [...] It's also an experience shared by the game's millions of players—a story of community and hope, overcoming odds, coming together over a shared love of the game, and, of course, blasting dragons with lightning bolts".

In 2018, Sam Keeper, for CoolStuffInc, wrote "It's bewildering that the main website of this game offers no comprehensive list of all the art books, novels, comics, and webcomics, with new releases coming out this very week highlighted and promoted all over every relevant article. This is the kind of thing bloggers and webcomic artists recognize the need to establish, so why does a company owned by Hasbro have such a disorganized back-and-current catalog? For goodness sake, this has actually gotten worse recently, with the former list of ebooks getting killed in the still buggy and archive-destroying site redesign a few years back. Even that, mind, was a bizarre mess, with single books missing from trilogies on different platforms, and no mention of Godsend, which had come out a month before this archive capture. Wizards seem to want to turn the storyline, somehow, into a global franchise and brand, but they seem pathologically unwilling to pay for the venture. [...] Certainly, it's hard to feel very invested in a fandom where I feel so little like I know what's going on, what is being released when, and how to actually give Wizards of the Coast my dang money!"

== Book titles ==
=== Harper Prism ===
Title	Type	Author	release	Isbn	eBook
Arena	Novel	William R. Forstchen	Nov 1994	ISBN 0-06-105424-0	Yes
Whispering Woods	Novel	Clayton Emery	Jan 1995	ISBN 0-06-105418-6	No
Shattered Chains	Novel	Clayton Emery	Mar 1995	ISBN 0-06-105419-4	No
Final Sacrifice	Novel	Clayton Emery	May 1995	ISBN 0-06-105420-8	No
The Cursed Land	Novel	Teri McLaren	Aug 1995	ISBN 0-06-105016-4	No
The Prodigal Sorcerer	Novel	Marc Sumner	Nov 1995	ISBN 0-06-105476-3	No
Ashes of the Sun	Novel	Hanovi Braddock	Mar 1996	ISBN 0-06-105649-9	No
Tapestries	Anthology	Edited by Kathy Ice	May 1996	ISBN 0-06-105308-2	No
Distant Planes	Anthology	Edited by Kathy Ice	May 1996	ISBN 0-06-105313-9	No
Song of Time	Novel	Teri McLaren	Jun 1996	ISBN 0-06-105622-7	No
And Peace Shall Sleep	Novel	Sonia Orin Lyris	Jul 1996	ISBN 0-06-105619-7	No
Dark Legacy	Novel	Robert E. Vardeman	Dec 1996	ISBN 0-06-105697-9	No

=== Wizards of the Coast ===
Title	Type	Cycle	Author	release	ISBN	eBook
The Brothers' War	Novel	Artifacts (I)	Jeff Grubb	May 1998	ISBN 0-7869-1170-0	Yes
Rath and Storm	Anthology		Edited by Peter Archer	Jul 1998	ISBN 0-7869-1175-1	Yes
Planeswalker	Novel	Artifacts (II)	Lynn Abbey	Sep 1998	ISBN 0-7869-1182-4	Yes
Colors of Magic	Anthology		Jess Lebow, ed.	Feb 1999	ISBN 0-7869-1323-1	No
Time Streams	Novel	Artifacts (III)	J. Robert King	Apr 1999	ISBN 0-7869-1344-4	Yes
The Gathering Dark	Novel	Ice Age (I)	Jeff Grubb	Jun 1999	ISBN 0-7869-1357-6	Yes
Bloodlines	Novel	Artifacts (IV)	Loren L. Coleman	Aug 1999	ISBN 0-7869-1380-0	Yes
Mercadian Masques	Novel	Masquerade	Francis Lebaron	Sep 1999	ISBN 0-7869-1188-3	Yes
The Thran	Novel		J. Robert King	Dec 1999	ISBN 0-7869-1600-1	Yes
Nemesis	Novel	Masquerade (II)	Paul B. Thompson	Feb 2000	ISBN 0-7869-1559-5	Yes
The Eternal Ice	Novel	Ice Age (II)	Jeff Grubb	May 2000	ISBN 0-7869-1562-5	Yes
The Myths of Magic	Anthology		Edited by Jess Lebow	Jun 2000	ISBN 0-7869-1529-3	No
Prophecy	Novel	Masquerade (III)	Vance Moore	Jun 2000	ISBN 0-7869-1570-6	Yes
Invasion	Novel	Invasion (I)	J. Robert King	Oct 2000	ISBN 0-7869-1438-6	Yes
Planeshift	Novel	Invasion (II)	J. Robert King	Feb 2001	ISBN 0-7869-1802-0	Yes
The Shattered Alliance	Novel	Ice Age (III)	Jeff Grubb	Dec 2000	ISBN 0-7869-1403-3	Yes
Johan	Novel	Legends (I)	Clayton Emery	Apr 2001	ISBN 0-7869-1803-9	No
Apocalypse	Novel	Invasion (III)	J. Robert King	Jun 2001	ISBN 0-7869-1880-2	Yes
The Dragons of Magic	Anthology		Edited by J. Robert King	Aug 2001	ISBN 0-7869-1872-1	No
Odyssey	Novel	Odyssey (I)	Vance Moore	Sep 2001	ISBN 0-7869-1900-0	Yes
Jedit	Novel	Legends (II)	Clayton Emery	Dec 2001	ISBN 0-7869-1907-8	No
Chainer's Torment	Novel	Odyssey (II)	Scott McGough	Jan 2002	ISBN 0-7869-2696-1	Yes
Secrets of Magic	Anthology		Ed. by Jess Lebow	Mar 2002	ISBN 0-7869-2710-0	No
Judgment	Novel	Odyssey (III)	Will McDermott	May 2002	ISBN 0-7869-2743-7	Yes
Hazezon	Novel	Legends (III)	Clayton Emery	Aug 2002	ISBN 0-7869-2792-5	No
Onslaught	Novel	Onslaught (I)	J. Robert King	Sep 2002	ISBN 0-7869-2801-8	No
Assassin's Blade	Novel	Legends 2 (I)	Scott McGough	Dec 2002	ISBN 0-7869-2830-1	No
Legions	Novel	Onslaught (II)	J. Robert King	Jan 2003	ISBN 0-7869-2830-1	No
Emperor's Fist	Novel	Legends 2 (II)	Scott McGough	Mar 2003	ISBN 0-7869-2935-9	No
Scourge	Novel	Onslaught (III)	J. Robert King	May 2003	ISBN 0-7869-2956-1	No
Monsters of Magic	Anthology		Edited by J. Robert King	Aug 2003	ISBN 0-7869-2983-9	No
The Moons of Mirrodin	Novel	Mirrodin (I)	Will McDermott	Sep 2003	ISBN 0-7869-2995-2	Yes
The Champion's Trial	Novel	Legends 2 (III)	Scott McGough	Nov 2003	ISBN 0-7869-3015-2	No
The Darksteel Eye	Novel	Mirrodin (II)	Jess Lebow	Jan 2004	ISBN 0-7869-3140-X	Yes
The Fifth Dawn	Novel	Mirrodin (III)	Cory Herndon	May 2004	ISBN 0-7869-3205-8	Yes
Outlaw: Champions of Kamigawa	Novel	Kamigawa (I)	Scott McGough	Sep 2004	ISBN 0-7869-3357-7	Yes
Heretic: Betrayers of Kamigawa	Novel	Kamigawa (II)	Scott McGough	Jan 2005	ISBN 0-7869-3575-8	Yes
Guardian: Saviors of Kamigawa	Novel	Kamigawa (III)	Scott McGough	May 2005	ISBN 0-7869-3786-6	Yes
Ravnica: City of Guilds	Novel	Ravnica (I)	Cory J. Herndon	Sep 2005	ISBN 0-7869-3792-0	Yes
Guildpact	Novel	Ravnica (II)	Cory J. Herndon	Jan 2006	ISBN 0-7869-3989-3	Yes
Dissension	Novel	Ravnica (III)	Cory J. Herndon	May 2006	ISBN 0-7869-4001-8	Yes
Time Spiral	Novel	Time Spiral (I)	Scott McGough	Oct 2006	ISBN 0-7869-3988-5	Yes
Planar Chaos	Novel	Time Spiral (II)	Scott McGough & Timothy Sanders	Jan 2007	ISBN 0-7869-4249-5	No
Future Sight	Novel	Time Spiral (III)	Scott McGough & John Delaney	Apr 2007	ISBN 0-7869-4269-X	No
Lorwyn	Novel	Lorwyn (I)	Cory J. Herndon & Scott McGough	Sep 2007	ISBN 0-7869-4292-4	No
Morningtide	Novel	Lorwyn (II)	Cory J. Herndon & Scott McGough	Jan 2008	ISBN 0-7869-4790-X	No
Shadowmoor	Anthology	Shadowmoor (I)	Edited by Peter Archer & Susan J. Morris	Apr 2008	ISBN 0-7869-4840-X	No
Eventide	Novel	Shadowmoor (II)	Cory J Herndon & Scott McGough	Jun 2008	ISBN 0-7869-4868-X	No
Alara Unbroken	Novel	Alara (I)	Doug Beyer	May 2009	ISBN 0-7869-5201-6	Yes
Agents of Artifice	Novel	Planeswalker (I)	Ari Marmell	November 2009	ISBN 0-7869-5134-6	Yes
The Purifying Fire	Novel	Planeswalker (II)	Laura Resnick	January 2010	ISBN 0-7869-5559-7	Yes
Zendikar: In the Teeth of Akoum	Novel	Zendikar	Robert B. Wintermute	April 2010	ISBN 0-7869-5476-0	Yes
Test of Metal	Novel	Planeswalker (III)	Matthew Stover	October 2010	ISBN 0-7869-5532-5	Yes
Scars of Mirrodin: The Quest for Karn	Novel	Mirrodin	Robert B. Wintermute	April 2011	ISBN 0-7869-5774-3	Yes
Return to Ravnica: The Secretist	eBook	Return To Ravnica (I)	Doug Beyer	November 2012	ASIN B009MYB82Y	Yes
Gatecrash: The Secretist	eBook	Return to Ravnica (II)	Doug Beyer	February 2013	ASIN B009MY9QWS	Yes
Dragon's Maze: The Secretist	eBook	Return to Ravnica (III)	Doug Beyer	May 2013	ASIN B00AD2OXLM	Yes
Theros: Godsend	eBook	Theros (I)	Jenna Helland	April 2014	ASIN B00FUZNL7O	Yes
Journey Into Nyx: Godsend	eBook	Theros (II)	Jenna Helland	May 2014	ASIN B00JNPF4JA	Yes

==== Dungeons & Dragons ====
The Magic Multiverse as a setting for Dungeons & Dragons was officially added to the game in November 2018.

Title	Lead Designer(s)	Type	Date	ISBN
Guildmasters' Guide to Ravnica	James Wyatt, Jeremy Crawford	Campaign setting	November 20, 2018	978-0-7869-6659-2
Mythic Odysseys of Theros	F. Wesley Schneider, James Wyatt	Campaign setting	June 2, 2020 (digital release), July 21, 2020 (physical release)	978-0-7869-6701-8

== Comics titles ==
=== Acclaim Comics' Armada label (1995–1996) ===
Title	Cycle	Author	release
Magic: the Gathering: The Shadow Mage	Planeswalker War	Jeffrey Gomez (wr.), Val Mayerik & James Dean Pascoe (art)	Jul 1995
Magic: the Gathering: The Shadow Mage (2)	Planeswalker War	Jeffrey Gomez (wr.) & Val Mayerik (art)	Aug 1995
Magic: the Gathering: The Shadow Mage (3)	Planeswalker War	Jeffrey Gomez (wr.), Val Mayerik & Rick J Bryant (art)	Sep 1995
Magic: the Gathering: The Shadow Mage (4)	Planeswalker War	Jeffrey Gomez (wr.), Val Mayerik, Rick J Bryant & Gonzalo Mayo (art)	Oct 1995
Ice Age on the World of Magic: the Gathering	?	Jeffrey Gomez (wr.), Rafael Kayanan & Rodney Ramos (art). Cover by Charles Vess	Jul 1995
Ice Age on the World of Magic: the Gathering (2)	?	Jeffrey Gomez (wr.), Rafael Kayanan & Rodney Ramos (art). Cover by Charles Vess	Aug 1995
Ice Age on the World of Magic: the Gathering (3)	?	Jeffrey Gomez (wr.), Rafael Kayanan & Rodney Ramos (art). Cover by Charles Vess	Sep 1995
Ice Age on the World of Magic: the Gathering (4)	?	Jeffrey Gomez (wr.), Rafael Kayanan & Rodney Ramos (art). Cover by Charles Vess	Oct 1995
Magic: the Gathering: Nightmare	?	Hillary J. Bader (wr.), Anthony Castrillo & Anibal Rodriguez (art)	Nov 1995
Fallen Empires on the World of Magic: the Gathering	?	Kevin Maples & Jeffrey Gomez (wr.), Alex Maleev & Rodney Ramos (art)	Sep 1995
Fallen Empires on the World of Magic: the Gathering (2)	?	Kevin Maples & Jeffrey Gomez (wr.), Alex Maleev & Rodney Ramos (art)	Oct 1995
Magic: the Gathering: Wayfarer	Planeswalker War/Wayfarer	Jeffrey Gomez (wr.), Val Mayerik, Rick J Bryant & Gonzalo Mayo (art). Cover by Michael Wm. Kaluta	Nov 1995
Magic: the Gathering: Wayfarer (2)	Planeswalker War/Wayfarer	Jeffrey Gomez (wr.), Val Mayerik, Rick J Bryant & Gonzalo Mayo (art). Cover by Michael Wm. Kaluta	Dec 1995
Magic: the Gathering: Wayfarer (3)	Planeswalker War/Wayfarer	Jeffrey Gomez (wr.), Val Mayerik, Rick J Bryant & Gonzalo Mayo (art). Cover by Michael Wm. Kaluta	Jan 1996
Magic: the Gathering: Wayfarer (4)	Planeswalker War/Wayfarer	Jeffrey Gomez (wr.), Val Mayerik, Rick J Bryant & Gonzalo Mayo (art). Cover by Michael Wm. Kaluta	Feb 1996
Magic: the Gathering: Wayfarer (5)	Planeswalker War/Wayfarer	Jeffrey Gomez (wr.), Val Mayerik, Rick J Bryant & Gonzalo Mayo (art). Cover by Michael Wm. Kaluta	Mar 1996
Antiquities War on the World of Magic: the Gathering	Antiquities War (1)	Jerry Prosser (wr.), Paul Smith & Thomas 'Tom' Ryder (art)	Nov 1995
Antiquities War on the World of Magic: the Gathering	Antiquities War (2)	Jerry Prosser (wr.), Phil Hester & Thomas 'Tom' Ryder (art)	Dec 1995
Antiquities War on the World of Magic: the Gathering	Antiquities War (3)	Jerry Prosser (wr.), Phil Hester & Thomas 'Tom' Ryder (art)	Jan 1996
Antiquities War on the World of Magic: the Gathering	Antiquities War (4)	Jerry Prosser (wr.), Phil Hester & Thomas 'Tom' Ryder (art)	Feb 1996
Magic: the Gathering: Arabian Nights	Arabian Nights	Jeof Vita & Susan Wright (wr.), Alex Maleev & Rodney Ramos (art)	Dec 1995
Magic: the Gathering: Arabian Nights (2)	Arabian Nights	Jeof Vita & Susan Wright (wr.), Alex Maleev & Rodney Ramos (art)	Dec 1995
Convocations: A Magic: the Gathering Gallery	-	Various	Jan 1996
Serra Angel on the World of Magic: the Gathering	Anthology	Margaret Weis & ?	Aug 1996
Homelands on the World of Magic: the Gathering	Anthology	D.G. Chichester (wr.) & Rebecca Guay (art)	Feb 1996
Legend of Jedit Ojanen on the World of Magic: the Gathering	?	Kenn Bell (wr.) & David Boller (art)	Mar 1996
Legend of Jedit Ojanen on the World of Magic: the Gathering	?	Kenn Bell (wr.) & David Boller (art)	Apr 1996
Magic: the Gathering: Shandalar	?	David Quinn (wr.) & Bo Hampton (art)	Apr 1996
Magic: the Gathering: Shandalar (2)	?	David Quinn (wr.) & Bo Hampton (art)	Apr 1996
A Magic: the Gathering Legend: Fallen Angel	?	Nancy A. Collins (wr.), Don Perlin, Dennis Callero & Richard Kane Ferguson (art)	May 1996
Elder Dragons: a Magic: the Gathering Legend	?	Art Holcomb (wr.) & Doug Tropea-Wheatley (art)	Apr 1996
Elder Dragons: a Magic: the Gathering Legend (2)	?	Art Holcomb (wr.) & Doug Tropea-Wheatley (art)	May 1996
Magic: the Gathering: Dakkon Blackblade	?	Jerry Prosser (wr.), Rags Morales & Barbara Kaalberg (art)	Jun 1996
Urza-Mishra War on the World of Magic: The Gathering	?	Jerry Prosser (wr.), Tom Mandrake & Bill Sienkiewicz (art). Cover by Bill Sienkiewicz	Sep 1996
Urza-Mishra War on the World of Magic: The Gathering (2)	?	Jerry Prosser (wr.), Tom Mandrake & Bill Sienkiewicz (art). Cover by Bill Sienkiewicz	Oct 1996

=== Dark Horse Comics (1998–1999) ===
Title	Type	Cycle	Author	release
Gerrard's Quest (1): Initiation	Comics	Gerrard's Quest	Mike Grell (wr.), Pop Mhan & Norman Lee (art)	March 1998
Gerrard's Quest (2): Legend	Comics	Gerrard's Quest	Mike Grell (wr.), Pop Mhan & Norman Lee (art)	April 1998
Gerrard's Quest (3): Crucible	Comics	Gerrard's Quest	Mike Grell (wr.), Pop Mhan & Norman Lee (art)	May 1998
Gerrard's Quest (4): Destiny	Comics	Gerrard's Quest	Mike Grell (wr.), Pop Mhan & Norman Lee (art)	September 1998
Gerrard's Quest	Collection	Gerrard's Quest	Mike Grell (wr.), Pop Mhan & Norman Lee (art)	April 1999

=== IDW Publishing (2012–2019) ===
Title	Issues	Writer(s)	Artist(s)	Publication date	
Magic: The Gathering	4	Matt Forbeck	Martin Coccolo	December 2011	March 2012
Magic: The Gathering: The Spell Thief	4	Matt Forbeck	Christian Duce, Martin Coccolo	May 2012	August 2012
Magic: The Gathering: Path of Vengeance	4	Matt Forbeck	Jack Jadson, Martin Coccolo	October 2012	February 2013
Magic: The Gathering: Theros	4	Jason Ciaramella	Martin Coccolo	October 2013	March 2014
Magic: The Gathering: Chandra	4	Vita Ayala	Harvey Tolibao	December 2018	February 2019
Magic: The Gathering: Trials of Alara	4	James Asmus	Eric Koda	Cancelled	

=== Boom! Studios (2021–2023) ===
Title	Issues	Writer(s)	Artist(s)	Colorist(s)	Premiere date	Finale date
Magic	1–25	Jed MacKay	Ig Guara	Arianna Consonni	April 2021	April 5, 2023
Magic: Master of Metal	One-shot	Mairghread Scott	Jorge Coehlo, French Carlomagno and Jacques Salomon	Francesco Segala	December 1, 2021	
Magic: The Hidden Planeswalker	1–4	Mairghread Scott	Fabiana Mascolo, Lea Caballero and French Carlomagno	Franceso Segala and Gloria Martinelli	April 20, 2022	July 27, 2022
Magic: Ajani Goldmane	One-shot	Seanan McGuire	Nori Retherford, Jaques Salomon, Giuseppe Cafaro, Lea Caballero and Michael Shelfer	Kieran Quingley, Natalia Nesterenko and Fernando Sifuentes	August 24, 2022	
Magic: Nahiri the Lithomancer	One-shot	Seanan McGuire	Fabiana Mascolo	TBA	November 30, 2022	
Magic Planeswalkers: Noble	One-shot	Stephanie Williams, Daniel Warren and Dave Rapoza	Alberto Locatelli and Lea Caballero	Arianna Consonni and Raúl Angulo	June 14, 2023	
Magic Planeswalkers: Notorious	One-shot	Cullen Bunn and Rich Douek	French Carlomagno and Carlos Pedro	TBA	August 23, 2023	

=== Dark Horse Comics (2025) ===
In July 2024, Wizards of the Coast announced that Dark Horse Comics will regain the Magic: The Gathering license, and is scheduled to launch a new line of comics in summer 2025.
