= 1998 Origins Award winners =

The following are the winners of the 25th annual (1998) Origins Award, presented at Origins 1999:

Category	Winner	Company	Designer(s)
Best Abstract Board Game of 1998	What Were You Thinking?	Wizards of the Coast	
Best Historical Board Game of 1998	Great War at Sea: Plan Orange	Avalanche	
Best Science Fiction or Fantasy Board Game of 1998	Crimson Skies	FASA Corp.	
Best Graphic Presentation of a Board Game of 1998	Crimson Skies	FASA Corp.	
Best Action Computer Game of 1998	Star Wars: Rogue Squadron	Lucas Arts	
Best Roleplaying Computer Game of 1998	Baldur's Gate	Interplay	
Best Strategy Computer Game of 1998	Starcraft	Blizzard/Havas	
Best Amateur Game Magazine of 1998	Mythic Perspectives: An Ars Magica Magazine	Gnawing Ideas	
Best Professional Game Magazine of 1998	Knights of the Dinner Table Magazine	Kenzer & Co.	
Best Trading Card Game of 1998	Deadlands CCG	Wizards of the Coast	
Best Traditional Card Game of 1998	Guillotine	Wizards of the Coast	
Best Card Game Expansion or Supplement of 1998	Magic: the Gathering: Urza's Saga	Wizards of the Coast	
Best Graphic Presentation of a Card Game of 1998	Deadlands CCG	Wizards of the Coast	
Best Game-Related Novel of 1998	The Silent Blade	Wizards of the Coast	
Best Game-Related Short Work of 1998	Leftovers	Pinnacle Entertainment Group	
Best Roleplaying Adventure of 1998	Return to the Tomb of Horrors	Wizards of the Coast	
Best Roleplaying Supplement of 1998	Greyhawk: The Adventure Begins	Wizards of the Coast	
Best Roleplaying Game of 1998	Star Trek: The Next Generation RPG	Last Unicorn Games	
Best Graphic Presentation of a Roleplaying Game, Adventure, or Supplement of 1998	Dragonlance Bestiary	Wizards of the Coast	
Best Historical Figure Miniatures Series of 1998	25mm Darkest Africa	Guernsey Foundry	
Best Science Fiction or Fantasy Figure Miniature of 1998	Hangin's Judge	Pinnacle Entertainment Group	
Best Vehicle Miniature of 1998	Velocipede	Pinnacle Entertainment Group	
Best Historical Miniatures Rules of 1998	Medieval Warfare	Terry Gore	
Best Science Fiction or Fantasy Miniatures Rules of 1998	Battletech Master Rules	FASA Corp.	
Best New Play-by-Mail Game of 1998	Dungeon	Madhouse USA	
Best Ongoing Play-by-Mail Game of 1998	Middle-earth PBM Fourth Age Circa 1000	Game Systems, Inc.	
1999 Inductees to the Adventure Gaming Hall of Fame	Richard Garfield		
1999 Inductees to the Adventure Gaming Hall of Fame	Magic: the Gathering	Wizards of the Coast	Designer: Richard Garfield
