= The Cursed Land =

The Cursed Land may refer to:

- The Cursed Land (novel), a 1995 novel by Teri McLaren
- The Cursed Land (film), a 2024 Thai supernatural horror film
