= Whispering Woods =

1995 novel by Clayton Emery

- Author: Clayton Emery
- Language: English
- Series: Greensleeves Trilogy
- Genre: Fantasy/Magic: The Gathering
- Publisher: HarperPrism
- Publication date: 1995
- Publication place: United States
- ISBN: 0-06-105418-6
- Preceded by: Arena
- Followed by: Shattered Chains

Whispering Woods is a 1995 fantasy novel by Clayton Emery published by Harper Fantasy. It was the second novel set in the Magic: The Gathering universe, and the first in Emery's "Whispering Woods Trilogy" or "The Greensleeves Trilogy"; it was followed by Shattered Chains, also published in the same year.

The novel was also translated into Czech, French, German, Hungarian, Japanese, Polish and Spanish.

== Plot ==
The novel is set on the plane of Dominaria. Its protagonist, Gull, is an ordinary man, a woodcutter whose village of White Ridge is destroyed in magical battles between powerful wizards, prompting him to leave with a seemingly benevolent wandering wizard named Towser. Accompanying them is Gull's sister, Greensleeves, initially portrayed as mute and intellectually disabled. After leaving the titular Whispering Woods, Greensleeves gradually regains her awareness and begins to manifest extraordinary magical abilities, eventually developing into one of the most powerful wizards in the setting. The novel serves as the foundation for later installments, in which Gull and Greensleeves take increasingly active roles in confronting rogue wizards across Dominaria.

== Reception ==
John C. Bunnell reviewed the novel, together with the first installment in the MtG series (Arena by William R. Forstchen), for Dragon magazine. Whispering Woods is described as more leisurely paced and lighter in tone than Arena, though still firmly rooted in conflict and danger. Rather than focusing primarily on powerful wizards, Emery centers his narrative on seemingly ordinary characters whose lives are disrupted and reshaped by magical duels. The reviewer notes that the novel gradually reveals deeper significance behind these characters, positioning the book as the opening volume of a larger narrative arc. As with Arena, the reviewer finds that Whispering Woods succeeds as an adventure story and captures the general flavor of Magic: The Gathering, but falls short in developing a richly detailed or coherent setting. Emery is criticized for treating the randomness and apparent purposelessness of magical combat as an unexamined given rather than interrogating its role within the world. The novel's naming conventions are highlighted as problematic, with their informal, quasi–British Isles tone clashing with the mythic and distant atmosphere suggested by the card game. Despite these issues, the review concludes that Whispering Woods, like Arena, represents a reasonable and credible early effort at adapting the game's themes into prose fiction, though the reviewer expresses hope that future novels do a better job at building a more unified vision of the game's world.

Virgil S. Greene reviewed the novel for Interregnum. Greene also compared the novel to Arena, evaluating it more favorably and describing it as a more engaging and enjoyable read. Particular praise is given to how creatures and spells from the card game are integrated into the narrative, with the reviewer noting that the story effectively shifts perspective away from powerful wizards toward ordinary people affected by their actions. The depiction of summoned creatures as unwilling participants in magical conflicts is highlighted as an especially interesting reinterpretation of the card game's mechanics. The review concludes that while the novel is not perfect, it successfully suggests what a narrative-driven Magic: The Gathering role-playing setting might look like and offers a compelling alternative viewpoint within the franchise's fictional universe.

The book was also reviewed by Matthew Frederick for ConNotations (Winter 1995 issue). The reviewer noted the interesting concept of summoned creatures, including sapient ones, being depicted as stranded in the new world after their summoner was defeated, and concluded that the book is a good opening for a larger story, "a fine piece of fiction that any fans of fantasy will enjoy", regardless whether they play the card game.

== Analysis ==
The writer noted that he wanted to explore how magic disrupts everyday life and how seemingly minor characters are drawn into larger conflicts. Emery also stated that the novel was written under a number of constraints, such as having to use specific Magic: The Gathering cards as a "magic catalogue", and retelling a story from an earlier two-part comic series. Despite its role in establishing recurring characters and themes, Whispering Woods, along with the rest of the early HarperCollins-published Magic novels, was later declared non-canonical by Wizards of the Coast following a reboot of the franchise's fictional continuity.

== Collectible card ==
The book contained a coupon redeemable for a promotional card from the game that has since become a rare collectible, although the sources vary on which card was available: according to one source, it was an alternate art Giant Badger, according to other sources, it was a Windseeker Centaur.
