= Świrus =

1996 video game

- Cover of Świrus
- Developer: Mirage
- Publisher: Vochozka Trading
- Release: 1996
- Genre: Point-and-click adventure
- Mode: Single-player first person

Świrus (Czech: Dr. Šílenec) is a 1996 Polish adventure video game developed by Mirage and published by Vochozka Trading, who also translated the game into Czech. Some years after its original release the game was released as a free download.

== Production ==
Świrus is the first polish adventure game designed for Windows. The humour of the game derives from the culture of Polish life in the 1980s and 1990s.

== Plot and gameplay ==
Świrus is a classic point & click adventure game, viewed from a first person perspective. it includes the command verb-based SCUMM interface. It features a comic art style. The player takes control of a teenager named Phillip who is visited by a clone from the future with a warning that he is the only one who can save the world from a mad Polish doctor named Dr. Šílenec.

== Critical reception ==
The game was reviewed in the Polish magazine Świat Gier Komputerowych.

In a nostalgic review of the game 18 years after its release Cnews.cz noted the game's sometimes crazy sense of logic.
