= Arena (novel) =

1994 novel

- Author: William R. Forstchen
- Language: English
- Genre: Fantasy/Magic: The Gathering
- Publisher: HarperPrism
- Publication date: 1994
- Publication place: United States
- ISBN: 0-06-105424-0
- Followed by: Whispering Woods

Arena is a 1994 fantasy novel by William R. Forstchen, published by Harper Fantasy. It was the first novel set in the Magic: The Gathering universe.

The book was translated and published in Czech, Dutch, German, Hungarian, Italian, Japanese, Polish, Portuguese and Spanish.

== Plot ==
The story follows Garth One-Eye, a colorless mage whose arrival at a magical festival in the city of Estark involving ritualized magical combat draws the attention of powerful figures, whose true motivations gradually come into question. Seeking revenge on the murderers of his family, he plays off one faction against another until they destroy one another, while finding a romantic interest in a local female soldier, Rakel.

The heroes of Arena, Garth and Rakel, appear in Shattered Chains by Clayton Emery.

== Reception ==
John C. Bunnell reviewed the novel, together with the second installment in the MtG series (Whispering Woods by Clayton Emery), for Dragon magazine. The review characterizes Arena as a competent and tightly paced adventure novel that makes effective use of the central mechanics of Magic: The Gathering, particularly wizard duels. The novel foregrounds spellcasting and structured contests in a way that closely mirrors gameplay, sometimes to the point where the influence of the card game is overtly visible. The reviewer praises Forstchen's brisk pacing, well-staged combat scenes, and sharply defined characters, noting that while the plot's twists are rarely surprising, they are sufficient to maintain narrative momentum. However, the review also criticizes the novel's worldbuilding, arguing that it struggles to construct a fully realized setting from the fragmentary lore provided by the card game. Forstchen is seen as making a stronger effort than Emery to synthesize a coherent vision of the world, but his depiction of magically specialized, city-based sorcerer clans is considered inconsistent with the broader diversity implied by the game's mechanics. The novel's inconsistent naming conventions are also cited as undermining its atmospheric ambitions. Overall, Arena is regarded as a solid but limited early attempt to translate Magic: The Gathering into long-form fiction.

Michał Nowakowski reviewed the Polish translations of Arena and another MtG novel (The Cursed Land) for Świat Gier Komputerowych. The reviewer found it a solid and engaging novel, noting that both titles are the first books set in that universe available to Polish readers. While the reviewer notes that the plot is relatively straightforward and that the intended twist ending becomes predictable well before the conclusion, the novel is nevertheless evaluated positively. Its primary strength, according to the reviewer, lies in how it vividly depicts spellcasting and magical mechanics directly recognizable from the card game, with explicit narrative representations of well-known spells and effects. The reviewer praises Forstchen's craftsmanship and the competent translation, emphasizing the novel's readability and its success in enriching the fictional world of the game. Although not regarded as a literary masterpiece, Arena is seen as a worthwhile and immersive read for Magic: The Gathering players, offering both atmospheric enjoyment and inspiration for role-playing scenarios.

== Analysis ==
It was the first novel in the set in the Magic: The Gathering universe. Arena, along with the rest of the early HarperCollins-published Magic novels, was later declared non-canonical by Wizards of the Coast following a reboot of the franchise's fictional continuity.

Clayton Emery, a writer who penned the next several novels set in the same universe, and reused Forstchen's characters, compared the plot of his novel to classics like Yojimbo, A Fistful of Dollars, and Last Man Standing.

== Collectible card ==
The book contained a coupon redeemable for two promotional cards from the game, Arena and Sewers of Estark.
