= The Brothers' War =

Novel by Jeff Grubb

- 1st edition cover
- Author: Jeff Grubb
- Language: English
- Series: Artifacts Cycle
- Genre: Fantasy novel
- Publisher: Wizards of the Coast
- Publication date: May 1998
- Publication place: United States
- Media type: Print (Paperback)
- Pages: 409 pp
- Followed by: Planeswalker

The Brothers' War is a Magic: The Gathering novel written by Jeff Grubb, and published by Wizards of the Coast, Inc. It takes place on the fictional world of Dominaria, within the 'multiverse'. It tells the story of the origins of Urza, who plays a significant role in Magic: The Gathering lore.

== Plot summary ==
The story opens with a prologue set on the eve of the world’s destruction, where Ashnod and Tawnos meet amid the wreckage of fallen war machines, reflecting on the long conflict that led there.

Decades earlier, brothers Urza and Mishra are taken in by the archaeologist Tocasia and raised at an excavation site studying ancient Thran artifacts. Though both are gifted, Urza favors disciplined mechanical study, while Mishra bonds with the desert Fallaji people. Their rivalry intensifies after discovering two powerful Thran relics—the Mightstone and the Weakstone—which grant opposing abilities. A violent confrontation between the brothers leads to Tocasia’s accidental death and Mishra’s flight into exile.

Urza settles in the city of Kroog, becoming a master artificer and marrying Princess Kayla bin-Kroog, while Mishra is enslaved by the Fallaji before rising to power by controlling ancient war machines. Each brother gathers followers and apprentices—Urza with Tawnos, Mishra with Ashnod—and their respective nations are drawn into a widening war fueled by increasingly destructive technology.

Attempts at reconciliation fail due to betrayal and manipulation, and the conflict escalates into decades of brutal warfare. Mishra, influenced by the secretive Brotherhood of Gix, gradually becomes corrupted and augmented by machine and otherworldly forces. Meanwhile, Urza leads a coalition opposing Mishra, engaging in an arms race that devastates the land.

The war culminates on the island of Argoth, where both brothers seek its remaining natural resources. In the final battle, Urza confronts a transformed, partially mechanical Mishra, now under the influence of the Phyrexian demon Gix. To end the war, Urza detonates the Golgothian Sylex, destroying Mishra, the island, and much of the surrounding world. The cataclysm triggers a global ice age.

As a result, Urza ascends to become a planeswalker, with the Mightstone and Weakstone forming his eyes. Burdened by regret over the devastation he caused, he leaves Dominaria to wander other worlds, setting the stage for future events.

== Reception ==
A review for Florida Today praised the book for its ability to engage readers throughout the narrative, particularly within the science-fiction genre. It highlights the novel’s connection to Magic: The Gathering, noting that Grubb expands upon the game’s established lore by focusing on the characters Urza and Mishra, whose names and artifacts had previously appeared on trading cards. The reviewer describes the novel as intense and demanding, suggesting it may not appeal to casual readers, but concludes that it is a strong recommendation for fans of science fiction.

A review for Świat Gier Komputerowych comments the work for exceeding the reviewer’s expectations for fiction based on a trading card game. Noting Jeff Grubb’s background as a former TSR author, the review highlights the novel’s portrayal of the lives of Urza and Mishra from childhood to their final confrontation, as well as its depiction of supporting characters such as Ashnod and Tawnos. The reviewer emphasizes the epic framing of the brothers’ conflict as a tragic struggle driven by envy and miscommunication, and commends the psychological depth of the characters, which is described as uncommon in game-related fantasy. He also notes that the novel is regarded as particularly important for Magic: The Gathering fans, as it is seen as one of the first works to give narrative depth and cohesion to the franchise’s universe.
