= Urza block =

Block of expansion sets in Magic: The Gathering

The Artifacts Cycle is a tetralogy of Magic: The Gathering expansion sets centered on the exploits of Urza Planeswalker. It consists of the expansions Antiquities (March 1994, anvil), Urza's Saga (October 1998, pair of gears), Urza's Legacy (February 1999, hammer) and Urza's Destiny (June 1999, Erlenmeyer Flask). The latter three sets are sometimes referred to as an "Urza block" for tournament purposes, since there have been formats and time periods in which cards from the later three sets were legal but cards from Antiquities were not. However, the books "The Brothers' War", "Planeswalker", "Timestreams", and "Bloodlines" unambiguously confirm that, from a story and thematic point of view, "Artifacts cycle" is correct and it begins with the events depicted in Antiquities.

== Antiquities ==
Antiquities
- Anvil
- Released: March 1994
- Size: 100 cards (41 commons and 59 uncommons)
- Print run: 15,000,000
- Keywords: None new
- Mechanics: Artifacts, artifact effects
- Designers: Skaff Elias, Jim Lin, Dave Petty, Joe Mick, and Chris Page
- Development code: Antiquities
- Expansion code: ATQ (AQ)
← Arabian Nights	Revised →

Antiquities is the second Magic: The Gathering expansion set. It was the first set to have a backstory unique to Magic that explores the mythos of the Magic universe. It is unique among all sets in that almost every card has the word "artifact" printed on it somewhere, either because it is an artifact or because it interacts with artifacts in some way.

=== Storyline ===
The storyline of Antiquities is originally told through the flavor text of the cards in the set. It is given in full in the 1998 novel "The Brothers' War" written by Jeff Grubb. In 1999 the prequel, "The Thran" by J. Robert King, appeared. It describes the events leading to the Thran-Phyrexian War and the conflict itself. The Thran are the civilization that created the powerstones that are the cause of the separation and ensuing conflict of Urza and Mishra.

The story of Antiquities takes place on the plane of Dominaria and centers on the two brothers Urza and Mishra. Urza is born on the first day of the year 0 AR and his brother, Mishra, on the final day of that year. Ten years later, when their father falls ill, they are sent as apprentices to their father's friend, the artificer Tocasia. After several years at Tocasia's camp where the brothers made several inventions and discoveries, they explore the Caves of Koilos, a place filled with Thran artifacts. There the brothers each find one half of a powerstone that sealed the gate to the plane of Phyrexia, which is also located in the caves. Mutual desire for the other's piece of the powerstone eventually leads them to turn the power of their stones onto each other. Attempting to end the duel, Tocasia puts herself into the middle, leading to her inadvertent death.

Afterwards, the brothers separate and leave the excavation site. In the following years, Urza and Mishra come into positions of substantial power in Yotia and among the Fallaji people respectively. After some hostilities, the empires eventually conduct open warfare against each other. The events during the conflict lead to both Urza and Mishra acquiring the leadership among their people. The conflict becomes an all-out war, but no side is able to gain the upper hand. In the final battle of the conflict, both armies fight to a standstill. Eventually, Urza activates the Golgothian Sylex, an artifact that Urza's lieutenant Tawnos received from Mishra's lieutenant Ashnod. The activation of the artifact triggers a blast that destroys the site of the last battle, the island of Argoth, and thus ends the war by destroying both armies. In the aftermath of the conflict, the blast triggered by the Golgothian Sylex upsets the climate of Dominaria leading to an Ice Age. The last days of this conflict were expanded upon further in the 1998 expansion set Urza's Saga.

=== Rarity ===
Antiquities cards were sold in booster packs that contain eight cards, two from the uncommon sheet, and six from the common sheet. Of the cards in Antiquities, 29 are U3, meaning that they appear three times on the uncommon print sheet. 4 are U2, and the remaining 26 uncommons are U1. These are usually dubbed the rares of the set. Also the card Tawnos's Weaponry, a U2, exists in two versions, one barely noticeably missing the circle behind the activation cost of the ability. For collector's purposes, Tawnos's Weaponry is thus sometimes counted as two U1 cards. Of the commons, 25 are C4. The remaining commons are 5 C2 and 11 C1. The C1 commons are usually dubbed as uncommons, as a C1 card is exactly as rare as a U3 card.

== Urza's Saga ==
Urza's Saga
- Two gears
- Released: October 1998; March 29, 2010 (MTGO)
- Size: 350 cards (110 commons, 110 uncommons, 110 rares, 20 basic lands)
- Keywords: Echo, Cycling
- Mechanics: "Free" spells, Sleeping and Growing Enchantments
- Designers: Mike Elliot (lead), Richard Garfield, Bill Rose, Mark Rosewater
- Developers: Mike Elliot (lead), William Jockusch, Bill Rose, Mark Rosewater, Henry Stern, Beth Moursund
- Development code: Armadillo
- Expansion code: USG
← Exodus	Mercadian Masques →

=== Set history ===
Urza's Saga has a storyline and thematic feel that suggest an artifact-based set, although the set was originally designed to be an enchantment-themed block. According to Mark Rosewater the decision to make the storyline of the set a story about Urza was made only when the design of the set had advanced beyond the point where the mechanical focus of the set could be shifted. Rosewater considers it to contain some of the most powerful artifacts (and artifact-related cards) ever released, with many cards now banned in tournament formats.

=== Storyline ===
The story of Urza's Saga is a prequel to the Mirage Cycle, and large parts of it take place concurrently with The Dark, Fallen Empires, Ice Age, and Alliances, explaining the origins and fates of many characters in those other sets. Parts of the storyline of Urza's Destiny formed a prequel to the Rath Cycle.

Whereas other sets have all five colors of cards referencing the same story, Urza's Saga has each of the five colors showing a different part of the storyline. Green cards detail the conflict on Argoth, which would lead to the events of the Ice Age expansion. Black cards reveal Urza's failed attack on the plane Phyrexia. White cards document Urza's period of recuperation in Serra's Realm. Blue cards explain Urza's founding of an academy on Tolaria and his temporal experiments. Red cards show Urza's alliance with Shiv.

Shiv, Phyrexia, Tolaria, and Serra's Realm are some of the most iconic settings in Magic: The Gathering. Most of the story of this set is written in the book Planeswalker, though the battle of Argoth is from the end of The Brothers' War and the founding of Tolaria and alliance with Shiv are found in Time Streams.

=== Mechanics ===
Urza's Saga introduced the mechanics of cycling and echo. Cycling cards allow a player to discard that card and pay a mana cost to draw a new card, effectually replacing the card with a new one. In Urza's Saga, the cost for cycling is always two colorless mana, but other costs were used when it appeared in subsequent sets. Echo is a mechanic that requires the player to pay the casting cost for a permanent again on his/her next turn, or it must be sacrificed. Urza's Saga contained a number of "free" blue spells that allowed the player to untap the same number of lands as the card's converted mana cost upon resolution, freeing land for other use. This mechanic was abused heavily with Tolarian Academy, which could produce more than one blue mana when tapped.

== Urza's Legacy ==
Urza's Legacy
- hammer
- Released: February 1999; June 21, 2010 (MTGO)
- Size: 143 cards (55 common, 44 uncommon, 44 rare)
- Keywords: Echo, Cycling
- Mechanics: "Free" spells, Sleeping and Growing Enchantments
- Designers: Henry Stern (lead)
- Developers: Mike Elliott; William Jockusch; Bill Rose; Mark Rosewater
- Development code: Guacamole
- Expansion code: ULG
← Exodus	Mercadian Masques →

=== Set history ===
Urza's Legacy is the first set to feature premium cards also known as foil cards, inserted randomly into boosters and replacing the card normally found in that rarity slot.

=== Storyline ===
Urza's Legacy continues the prequel storyline started in Urza's Saga, following Urza's quest to fight Phyrexia's godlike master, Yawgmoth, and his plans to conquer his home world, Dominaria. After an attempt to manipulate time goes catastrophically wrong, Urza searches for more allies as he builds a skyship to lead the war against Phyrexia. While he is away, the people of his Tolarian Academy have to battle a Phyrexian infestation on the island itself. The story of this set is recounted in the book Time Streams.

=== Mechanics ===
Cycling and echo were expanded upon in Urza's Legacy, including with echo permanents that were non-creatures.

== Urza's Destiny ==
Urza's Destiny
- Erlenmeyer Flask
- Released: June 23, 1999
- Size: 143 cards (55 commons, 44 uncommons, 44 rares)
- Keywords: Echo, Cycling
- Mechanics: "Cycling from play" creatures, "Reveal" mechanic, "Lobotomy" cards
- Designers: Mark Rosewater Cycle Name = Artifacts
- Development code: Chimichanga
- Expansion code: UDS
← Exodus	Mercadian Masques →

=== Set history ===
Urza's Destiny was the first Expert-level set to be printed under the then-new 6th Edition rules changes; the most notable change seen on cards is the text of creatures. Whereas a card like Llanowar Elves would be given "Summon Elf" in previous sets, it would now be given "Creature - Elf".

=== Storyline ===
With the skyship Weatherlight completed, Urza now works on a eugenics program to create a perfect crew for it, as well as engineering a race of soldiers to fight the Phyrexian invasion. One of his geneticists, Gatha, defects, and uses his knowledge to improve the Keldon race. Meanwhile, the Phyrexians create the plane of Rath as a staging ground for the invasion.

=== Mechanics ===
Urza's Destiny continued to expand on some of the mechanics introduced in Urza's Saga. It had a number of creatures and auras with abilities that trigger when put into a graveyard from the battlefield. There are also a number of permanents that can be sacrificed to draw a card, reminiscent of the cycling ability.

== History and impact ==
Urza's Saga ushered in a new era of combo decks. The period of play after the release of Urza's Saga is often referred to as "Combo Winter" by both players and Wizards staff. Standard and "Urza Block Constructed" decks were so fast that they could often win before turn three. Several articles on the Wizards of the Coast website MagicTheGathering.com discuss various tournaments in which players would mulligan down to half their starting hand size just for the perfect initial hand. A ban on several of the set's most powerful cards followed. The joke of the era was that "the early game was the coin flip, the mid game was the mulligan, and the end game was the first turn."

In all, The Artifacts cycle has had more cards banned from tournament play than any other cycle. Over the course of the cycle's history, 16 different cards have at one point been banned in at least one DCI sanctioned format, nine of which debuted in Urza's Saga (Stroke of Genius, Time Spiral, Windfall, Yawgmoth's Will, Goblin Lackey, Voltaic Key, Gaea's Cradle, Serra's Sanctum, and Tolarian Academy).

== Notable cards ==
Notable cards from Urza's Saga included Gaea's Cradle, Goblin Lackey, Morphling, Show and Tell, Tolarian Academy, and Yawgmoth's Will.

Memory Jar is a notable card from Urza's Legacy, in part because it was one of the cards banned the fastest. One notable card from Urza's Destiny is Yawgmoth's Bargain.

== Reception ==
Urza's Saga won the 1998 Origins Award as "Best Card Game Expansion or Supplement".

In a review in the May 1999 issue of InQuest, Jeff Hennes stated that Urza's Legacy was an average set "mired in mediocrity" that lacked unifying elements with the other sets in its block and that he described as "more a collection of random cards than an expansion".
