= Magic: The Gathering Online =

Video game adaptation of Magic: The Gathering

- Magic: the Gathering Online Logo
- Developers: Leaping Lizard Software (initial); Wizards of the Coast (v2.0); Daybreak Game Company (from October 2022 and on)
- Publisher: Wizards of the Coast
- Platform: Microsoft Windows
- Release: June 2002
- Genre: Digital collectible card game
- Mode: Multiplayer

Magic: The Gathering Online is a video game adaptation of Magic: The Gathering, utilizing the concept of a virtual economy to preserve the collectible aspect of the card game. It is played through an Internet service operated by Wizards of the Coast, which went live on June 24, 2002. The game does not run on mobile (iOS or Android) as Magic: the Gathering Arena does, since it is only available for Microsoft Windows. Users can play the game or trade cards with other users.

As of February 2007, Magic Online has over 300,000 registered accounts; this does not represent the true number of players since people are allowed to register multiple accounts. According to Worth Wollpert in 2007, Magic Online was "somewhere between 30% to 50% of the total Magic business." In December 2021, Wizards of the Coast entered into a "long-term" licensing agreement to transfer development, operations, and publishing of Magic Online to Daybreak Games.

== Gameplay ==
Magic Online is played as an electronic analogue to the physical card game. Digital artwork reproduces the look of the paper card game, and users interact with their cards to play with them on a virtual tabletop. Each game is hosted by the Magic Online servers, which apply a rules engine to enforce proper play. Though the rules set as a whole is largely accurate and works well, it occasionally suffers from bugs.

Players can set up or join casual games of their choice for free in several rooms within the Constructed Open Play area. Currently, the casual game rooms are as follows: Just Starting Out, a room for players who are new to the game and are not looking for a tough duel. Games in this room are limited to the Standard format to restrict the power of the cards being used. Just For Fun, a room designed for players to play fun, casual decks against one another. This is the most populated room and has no restrictions on what format a player can host a game in. Getting Serious, this room is provided as a step up from the Just For Fun room, but it is usually unoccupied. Tournament Practice is the most competitive room in the Constructed Open Play area, it is where the most serious players go to test their best decks before entering them into a Constructed event.

In addition to free casual play, official competitive tournaments take place around the clock. Tournament play includes 8-person constructed events (in a variety of formats), limited sealed deck and drafts (generally using the most recently released expansions), as well as larger tournaments that take place according to a regular schedule. Entering events requires an investment of sealed packs and/or event tickets, with winners being rewarded with additional product.

Up until Version 3, League play was another method of competitive play. These month-long events were sealed deck tournaments of 256 players that allowed for intermittent play over a period of 4 weeks at the pace the player desired. After 6 years, leagues returned in February 2016. Initially they were only available for the sealed limited format. Leagues last two months, and in that time window a player can usually play between 5 and 9 matches. Once a player finishes playing their league matches, prizes are awarded and they can rejoin the league if they want. Currently, leagues are available in a variety of formats, including Standard, Modern, Legacy and Limited Sealed. Sealed leagues also offer "Friendly" and "Competitive" alternatives with different prize structures. The Competitive Sealed League lasts for 5 matches and typically features higher skilled players due to the top-heavy prize structure - winning all or most of your rounds provides a lucrative prize, with the downside of no prizes being offered to those who win less than 60% of their matches. The Friendly Sealed League lasts for a total of 9 matches and caters to a larger portion of the player base and offers prizes regardless of number of matches won. In addition, after each "stage" of 3 matches, the player has the option to add a booster pack to their deck to make it stronger for the next stage (either by using one from their inventory or purchasing one within the sealed tournament window).

== Development ==
Leaping Lizard Software (LLS) had just completed a software product Magic Interactive Encyclopedia designed to allow Magic players to track which cards they owned and other cards that had been printed to help with online play. LLS initially approached Wizards of the Coast with an offer to create an online version of Magic: The Gathering. WotC was skeptical about whether such a system could be implemented. LLS then created a tech demo to prove to WotC that an online collectible card game could work. WotC was sufficiently convinced and contracted LLS to develop the service, which was then known as Magic Online with Digital Objects (MODO). Initially, the idea of charging for virtual goods, as opposed to a subscription model with unlimited access, was greeted with skepticism. Additionally, concerns were floated over how solid the server and trading code would be. After a period of beta-testing, the game became available to the general public on June 24, 2002. The name was changed from MODO to its final commercial title: Magic: The Gathering Online. At the time of launch, Magic Online supported Magic cards from the 7th Edition onwards.

In 2003, the Magic: The Gathering Invitational was held online for the first time. It was played on Magic Online each year from then on until 2007 when the Invitational was moved back offline.

=== Version 2.0 ===
Knowing that it was possible to translate Magic's gameplay online through the work LLS had done, WotC started to work at redesigning the Magic Online client in 2003. Though they praised the "groundbreaking" work LLS had done, they opted to terminate their contract with them and bring the development in-house to be able to focus on the direction needed to improve the client for a global audience.

The first showing of the new team was to be the online release of 8th Edition in July 2003, which was ambitiously scheduled to coincide with the paper release. The goal was to release Version 2 of the software with new functionality and implement the changes in rules that the 8th Edition had brought. However, with the change from LLS to the internal developers along with the fixed deadline, a number of development issues arose that were not resolved by launch. Version 2 was released on schedule, but the servers constantly crashed, and rules mistakes and other bugs were numerous. The game went into no-pay mode while temporary beta servers were opened to allow players to practice playing in for-pay formats.

As a concession for these issues, Wizards planned to throw "Chuck's Virtual Party," a weekend of free tournaments after the problems settled down. Unfortunately, it turned out that each user took up more memory in version 2 than the lightweight design of version 1. The result was that the servers crashed again under the strain.

In retrospect, some have merely chalked the decision to remove Leaping Lizard up to hubris. Others, however, point to certain intractabilities in later maintenance that suggest that Leaping Lizard had not delivered a very extensible program that, by nature, was too monolithic and hard to improve. Wizards of the Coast has said that "Leaping Lizard's 2.5 interface and backend are not scalable like we need it to be. It wasn't written with the goal of ten thousand users in mind, it was written thinking a couple thousand." According to the developers, there was a hard limit of 4,400 players in version 2.5. Regardless, Wizards decided that version 2.0 was not worth supporting indefinitely. They decided to maintain version 2.0 in the background but to start a new development team to rebuild Magic Online from the ground up. The labors of this new project would be called Magic Online version 3, which was first announced in February 2004.

The version 2 platform was shut down on April 9, 2008, in preparation for the version 3 launch.

=== Version 3.0 ===
Magic Online version 3, in addition to supporting a much larger player base through multiple servers, was also to feature an updated interface and expanded in-game guidance. The release date, originally planned in late 2006, slipped several times, but eventually passed through beta testing and was released to the public on April 22, 2008. Initial reactions to the Version 3 were critical of the new user interface layout, and players found the server structure was not as stable as expected.

A notable incident called "Kiblergate" took place in 2013 as WotC were preparing Version 4 of the client. As part of a Magic Online Championship Series played via the client, which came with a US$25,000 prize and invitation to the Magic: The Gathering World Championship, Brian Kibler had won enough games to advance into the final rounds of play regardless of whether he won or lost. However, before his last two games, he had lost connection to the Magic Online servers, and could not log back on in time. Because he was not present for these games, he was considered to have forfeit his spot and was disqualified. Kibler took to social media to complain and suggest other players delete Magic Online from their computers, which caused the average cost of Magic Online digital cards to fall 11% in one day and prompted WotC to move quicker with the transition to Version 4.

=== Version 4.0 ===
Magic Online version 4 opened to the public in wide beta on September 4, 2012. Both version 3 and version 4 ran simultaneously, with players having an option to play on either platform, until June 26, 2014, when Version 3 was shuttered. On July 16, 2014, version 4 became the sole client for Magic: the Gathering Online.

=== Card sets available ===
As of March 2014 with the release of Vintage Masters, almost all Cards that are tournament legal for at least one supported format are available. Most of the remaining tournament legal cards that are not printed are basically considered as tournament unworthy (such as cards that only trigger their ability during drafts). The earliest set available upon release was Invasion, which had been released in printed form in October 2000; all sets moving forward were made available online as well, with the exception of some self-parody expansions (Un-sets) and multiplayer sets (like Conspiracy). For the first 10 years of "Magic Online" sets released online three or four weeks after they released in paper in an effort to appease "brick & mortar" retailers. However, a policy of shortening this delay (to about two weeks) was instituted to allow professional players (who often use "Magic Online" for testing) to prepare for Pro Tour events (which usually happen two weeks after the release of a new set) and to "increase cohesion" between paper and online Magic. Wizards of the Coast has since released more pre-Invasion cards online. In autumn of 2005, Mirage was released online, nine years after its 1996 print release. This set was chosen as the earliest set usable on Magic Online because it was the first to be designed with both Limited and Constructed play in mind and the first to be intended as part of a three-set block. Additionally, Wizards unambiguously owns the rights to the artwork in Mirage block, and Mirage block contains no ante cards (unlike Ice Age and Homelands). It has been confirmed that the eventual goal of the developers was to have every expansion set from Mirage onward available online.

For cards released before Mirage, special MTGO-exclusive compilation sets called Masters Editions were created. These sets range in size from 195 to 269 cards. Most of the cards in a given set were previously unavailable on Magic Online. Exceptions are usually made to create enjoyable Masters Edition limited environments or to make specifically illustrated cards available online. The first Masters Edition was released on September 10, 2007, with Masters Edition II following in 2008, Masters Edition III in 2009, and Masters Edition IV in early 2011. As of January 2011, Magic Online was missing about 800 cards from the pre-Mirage and Portal sets. Most of the missing cards do not impact normal gameplay, as many older cards have become outclassed, or functional reprints have been offered. Nearly all other pre-Mirage cards usually considered tournament worthy have been released online. The Power Nine were released in a set called "Vintage Masters", along with tournament-worthy cards featured in Conspiracy, which was available in a limited period in June 2014. The addition of Vintage (which also replaced the alternative "Classic" format), made all sanctioned paper formats also available to be played on "Magic Online." In May 2015, a selected range of cards from Tempest block were re-released in a set called "Tempest Remastered".

The sets from Mirage to Invasion were released every few months from 2006 to 2011. In April 2006, Visions, the second set of the Mirage Block, was released online. The third set, Weatherlight, was released on December 12, 2007. The Tempest block has been released in its entirety. Stronghold went on sale on April 13, 2009, and Exodus was released on December 7, 2009. Of the Urza's block Urza's Saga went on sale on March 29, 2010, Urza's Legacy followed in June, and Urza's Destiny was released on April 13, 2011. The Mercadian Masques block followed in December 2011. The Masques block was released in Booster Packs containing cards from all expansions of the block. After the release of the Mercadian Masques block, all of the cards from Mirage forward are online, with the exception of several cards from the Portal sets.

Since the Amonkhet set in 2017, Online sets release in coherence of the paper counterpart's prerelease event: the Online set is available and can be used in tournaments on the day of paper prerelease event.

== Reception ==
The original Magic Online generally met favorable reviews. GameSpot named it a runner-up for its July 2002 "PC Game of the Month" award. Version 2 of Magic Online was very similar to version 1 regarding the interface and functionality. Thus the problems of stability in the transition phase from version 1 to version 2 stood out in the perception of the public. Version 3, released in April 2008 was seen as a step back graphically to version 2, but by the end of its life it was highly regarded among Magic Online users. Version 4 was initially criticized while in beta, but has shown dramatic improvements from 2013 to 2014.

== Reviews ==
- Pyramid

== Parallels to paper Magic ==
All cards that enter circulation originate from sealed booster packs or other products available through the Magic Online store; on Magic Online, these packs are represented as digital objects tied to a player's account. Virtual packs are purchased from within the client at MSRP. Once purchased, packs may be opened, traded, or used as entry materials for events.

Foil cards are available online. They are distinguished in their virtual form by a glossier appearance and an intermittent "shiny" animation.

Since 2009, some of the major events in Magic Online winners would be invited to (paper format) Pro Tour events. Between 2012 and 2017, the newly reformed Magic: The Gathering World Championship had a slot exclusively for the winner of the annual championship of Magic Online.

=== Redemption ===
Wizards of the Coast allows collectors who have assembled a full set of digital cards from a single expansion to exchange them for a factory set of paper cards for a $25 fee (plus shipping and handling). Regular cards and foil cards must be redeemed separately and cannot be mixed on a single redemption order. Each set is eligible for a period of as much as 4 years after the online release. This program was initially created in order to allay doubt and uncertainty over the investment into virtual cards.

The redemption policy offers a medium of exchange between the digital card market and the physical card market, though this is one-way only as there is no way to convert paper cards to digital cards. However, during Pax Australia in summer 2013 Wizards of the Coast announced that "reverse redemption" (the ability to turn physical, paper cards to the digital cards of "Magic Online") is a potential upcoming improvement to stay ahead of increased competition in the digital card game market.

== In-game economy ==
The client software for Magic Online may be downloaded for free from Wizards of the Coast's website, but to play the game, it is necessary to register an account. Registration costs $4.99 and comes with a new account package. This package has 5 event tickets, 20 new player points (used to enter special, "phantom" events), 5 avatars, and over 650 common and uncommon cards.

Users may trade cards, sealed packs, event tickets, and in-game avatars (which are released for special events as promotions) with other players through the "Classifieds," which acts as a searchable bulletin board on which players post buy requests for certain cards, or notices of cards they own that are available for trade/sale.

In previous versions of Magic Online, other suggested methods of trading existed, but have since been abandoned in favor of the Classifieds, as the other methods were inefficient and prone to spam. A large number of the users posting offers to buy or sell are entrepreneurs with large collections looking to make a profit by selling cards at their own websites in addition to their in-game trades. Technically any transfer of cards in the game is not considered a "sale" because, for legal reasons, the digital objects are not actually owned by the collector, but rather Wizards of the Coast themselves. This enormously simplifies transactions, as issues such as import/export laws, duties, and underage concerns are sidestepped. Wizards has currently shown "benign neglect" of players buying and selling digital objects for (legal) currency on the secondary market. Due to this neglect, however, there can be problems with fraud, including non-delivery of paid-for product and false claims of non-delivery resulting in reversals of PayPal payments.

=== Economy ===
Event tickets act as a de facto unit of in-game currency; demand for them is sustained by the tens of thousands of tickets used up every day to pay for tournament entry. Every single ticket in the market was purchased from Wizards of the Coast for US$1, offering a baseline. Since tickets can be traded between players and they have a roughly fixed value in dollars, prices for cards in the trading rooms are usually quoted in tickets. When sold for money on the secondary market, a ticket is usually worth slightly less than US$1. Play Points were introduced to the game in 2015 and are a secondary in-game currency that are not tradable between accounts.

Magic Online allows players to use the same cards in multiple decks. Since the maximum number of copies of a card in a deck is usually 4 (the major exceptions being basic lands), any duplicates of a card beyond the fourth are unnecessary for deck building and can be traded off.

Due to the ease of trading away unwanted or extra cards, transaction costs on Magic Online are very low. While in real-life, the money gained by finding a better price at a different store might not make up for the expense in checking the other store (gas, time, effort, etc.), it's simple and quick to search for other values of a card you'd like to buy or sell online. This ensures competition where all prices move quickly towards the market price.

One inefficiency that the market does have is that since the ticket is the main unit of in-game currency, the bid–ask spread on cards is effectively fixed at one ticket. This makes buying and selling of cards quickly somewhat inefficient; other effects are that cards which cost less than a ticket must be offered in bulk (or else as standard barters). There are at any given time a large number of online 'bots', which are vendors who offer prices for buying and selling digital objects down to the hundredth of a ticket (maintaining a balance on account of fractional tickets for users where needed). Furthermore, in August 2009 the limit of cards allowed per trade was raised from 32 to 75, allowing much more flexibility. This limit was raised further in 2013 to allow for a maximum of 400 cards per trade.

=== Automated trading ===
Magic Online has accumulated a secondary market composed of automated traders, which have become the most common way to obtain cards. These traders, known as "bots", are accounts running programs designed to trade cards at variable prices and qualities. A simple bot might be one that will buy any three rares for one ticket, and offer any two rares it has for a ticket. More complicated bots can maintain detailed price lists and notice trends; for example, if many traders are selling one particular card, that is a clue that the bid price is too high, and it should either stop buying that card or automatically lower the price it bids for it. Lastly, some bots are designed to help advertise competing sellers' prices and give users a general sense of the values of cards they have.

=== Tournament effects on the market ===
Drafters and their recently acquired cards represent a main source of singles to the market. Winners in any tournament usually get balanced amounts of the packs used to enter; for example, someone who won 3 packs in an Onslaught-Onslaught-Legions draft would receive 2 packs of Onslaught and 1 pack of Legions. Conveniently, this is exactly what would be required to do a similar event again, along with a two ticket entry cost. For those not so lucky, or those needing tickets, they can sell singles from their opened packs to help defray the costs of the next draft.

Some online tournament players fund their continued play by selling the packs they win as prizes and extra cards they open for tickets, which they then use to enter more tournaments. While there may be a very small number of successful players who are able to sustain their tournament play indefinitely this way (termed: "going infinite"), this amount of success is not the norm.

=== Shortages ===
When Magic Online launched in the summer of 2002, the current set of the time was late Odyssey block. As a result, the preceding Invasion block was only sold for a very short time on Magic Online. This short supply, combined with rising demand as Magic Online's user base grew and the server became more stable, helped spike some early cards' prices. Chase cards from these early sets demand much higher prices than their paper counterparts; popular rares sell on eBay for 5 to 10 times as much as the physical version, and even commons can command a premium. Odyssey block and 7th Edition also had a shorter than normal "print run", though not as extreme.

To counteract the shortage of Invasion block cards, Wizards began offering Invasion block packs as prizes in special tournaments in lieu of normal prizes.

== Magic Online Championship ==
The Magic Online Championship, formerly known as the Magic Online World Championship, has been held each year. It was originally held in conjunction with the Magic: The Gathering World Championship in 2009, but has been held as an independent event since 2012. The year in the event name (for events since 2012) denotes the year in which players qualified; the event itself takes place the following calendar year.

=== Eligibility ===
The 2009 tournament contained only 8 players: the winners of seven end-of-season championships and the Magic Online Player of the Year. In 2010, the tournament was expanded to include 12 players: the winners of ten end-of-season championships, the Magic Online Player of the Year and the winner of a last chance qualifier. The 2017 Magic Online Championship featured the previous Magic Online Championship winner, the finalists of four end-of-season playoffs, the winner of eight opens, and the rest were filled by at-large slots until the event had 24 players.

=== Tournament Structure ===
The structure of the tournament has been altered over the years. It usually consists of three to four different formats (which including at least one constructed format and one limited format) utilizing the Swiss with a playoff following a cut to the top 2 or top 4 players.

| Year | Format used |
|---|---|
| 2009 | Standard, Classic, Zendikar Booster Draft |
| 2010 | Standard, Extended, Masters Edition IV Booster Draft |
| 2011 | Standard, Modern, Innistrad Booster Draft |
| 2012 | Standard, Gatecrash Sealed Deck, Cube Draft |
| 2013 | Standard, Modern, Theros-Born of the Gods Booster Draft, Cube Draft |
| 2014 | Standard, Modern, Vintage, Dragons of Tarkir-Fate Reforged Booster Draft |
| 2015 | Standard, Modern, Legacy, Shadows over Innistrad Booster Draft |
| 2016 | Standard, Kaladesh block Booster Draft |
| 2017 | Modern, Ixalan block Booster Draft |

=== Prizes ===
The qualified players of each of the four seasons (finalists of each season's playoffs and winners of two opens), along with being awarded an invitation to the annual Magic Online Championship, win a variety of other prizes, including a premium foil set of every card on Magic Online, booster parks and gardens and a half years ago when you have to go home for sale, and an invitation to the next Magic: The Gathering Pro Tour.

The annual championship event, as of 2017, has a prize pool of $200,000. The winner of the event takes home as much as $40,000, and each of the 24 participants is guaranteed a portion of the prize pool. The winner will additionally receive an invitation to the next Magic Online Championship, as well as Platinum Level in the Pro Players Club for a specific period (roughly a year).

=== Winners ===
| Year | MTGO Name | Name |
|---|---|---|
| 2009 | Anathik | (Finland) Anssi Myllymäki |
| 2010 | Jabs | (Brazil) Carlos Romão |
| 2011 | reiderrabbit | (United States) Reid Duke |
| 2012 | Butakov | (Russia) Dmitriy Butakov |
| 2013 | Malavi | (Denmark) Lars Dam |
| 2014 | Lantto | (Sweden) Magnus Lantto |
| 2015 | NielsieBoi | (Netherlands) Niels Noorlander |
| 2016 | wrapter | (United States) Josh Utter-Leyton |
| 2017 | Butakov | (Russia) Dmitriy Butakov |
| 2018 | Schiapponetor | (Italy) Mattia Oneto |
| 2019 | | (United States) Michael Jacob |

== See also ==
- Magic: The Gathering video games
