= Sonia Orin Lyris =

American novelist

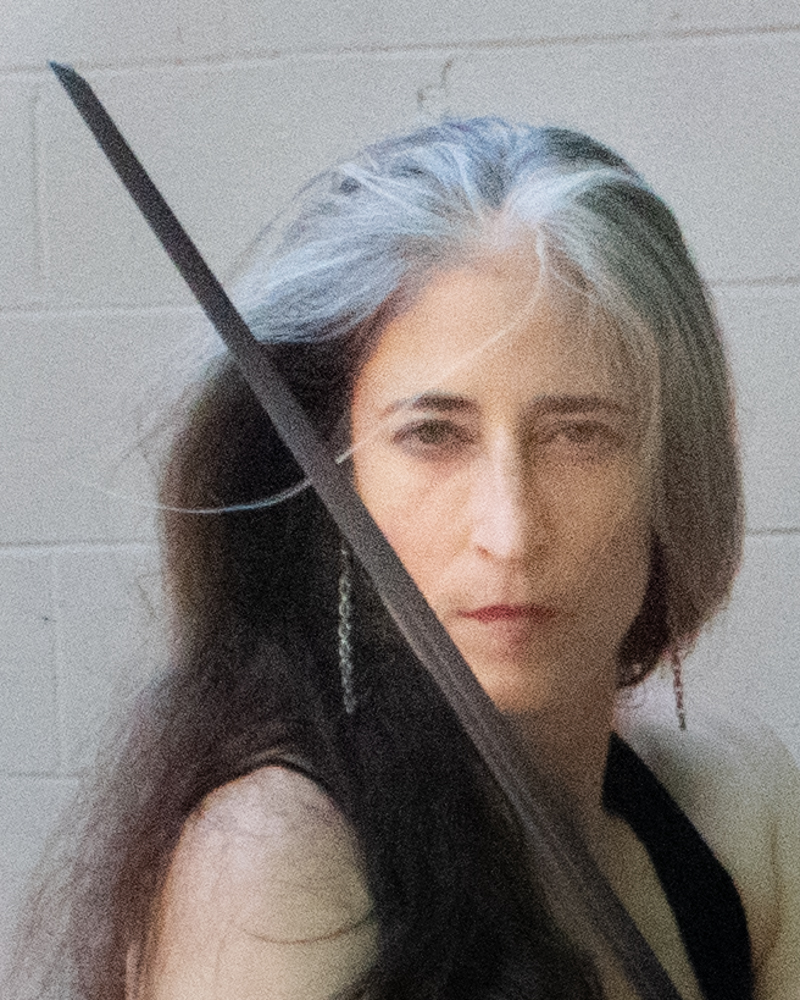
- Occupation: Author; Communications director
- Genre: Science fiction and fantasy
- Notable works: The Seer

Website
- lyris.org

Sonia Orin Lyris is the author of several novels and various science fiction and fantasy stories and articles in computing and literary journals. She is the author of The Seer and the sequel novels forming The Stranger Trilogy. She has published fiction for Wizards of the Coast, Asimov's Science Fiction Magazine, and Pulphouse.

In 1996, she co-founded eMarket Group, Ltd., an online merchandise company, and worked with them as Executive Vice President. She also helped to build systems for e-commerce sites such as Sony Pictures, Paramount Pictures, Variety, and Viz Media.

Lyris is communications director and a contributing editor for the C-spot and has been associate editor at the Journal of Universal Rejection (JofUR). In 2012, she was interviewed in an episode of The Tomorrow Project podcast, where she discussed the relationship between real-world science and science fiction.

Lyris lives in Seattle, Washington.

== Bibliography ==
=== Novels and series ===
==== The Seer Saga ====
- Touchstone. Knotted Road Press. 2020 [2016]. ISBN 9781644701690. A short prequel to The Seer, previously published as part of "Free Stories 2016". Baen Ebooks.
- The Seer. Riverdale, NY: Baen. 2016. ISBN 9781476781266. OCLC 913337123.
  The Stranger Trilogy is the sequel to The Seer.
- Unmoored. The Stranger Trilogy. Vol. Book 1. Knotted Road Press (published May 14, 2020). May 14, 2020. ISBN 9781644701577.
- Maelstrom. The Stranger Trilogy. Vol. Book 2. Knotted Road Press (published July 14, 2020). July 14, 2020. ISBN 9781644701614.
- Landfall. The Stranger Trilogy. Vol. Book 3. Knotted Road Press (published September 20, 2020). September 16, 2020. ISBN 9781644701638.

==== The Witches of Marigold ====
- Lyris, Sonia Orin (2022). The Unturned Stone. The Witches of Marigold. Knotted Road Press. ISBN 9781644703199. (Book One)
- Lyris, Sonia Orin (2025). The Wayward Ring. The Witches of Marigold. Knotted Road Press. ISBN 9781644704363. (Book Two)

==== Magic: The Gathering ====
- — (July 1995). "The Going Price". In Ice, Kathy (ed.). Tapestries. Magic: The Gathering. New York: HarperPrism. pp. 257–282. ISBN 9780061053085. OCLC 1036746408.
- — (1996). "Chef's Surprise". In Ice, Kathy (ed.). Distant Planes : an anthology. Magic: The Gathering. New York: HarperPrism. pp. 41–66. ISBN 9780061053139. OCLC 757621074.
- And Peace Shall Sleep. Magic: The Gathering. Vol. Book 11. New York: HarperPrism. 1996. ISBN 9780061056192. OCLC 34955423. And Peace Shall Sleep has translations in German, French, and Polish.

=== Shorter fiction ===
- — (1989). "Blades". Quanta. ISSN 1053-8496. OCLC 22652866. Archived from the original on November 19, 2008.
- — (1992). "Eyes of the Beholder". Midnight Zoo. 2 (1). Jon L. Herron. OCLC 24250703.
- — (August 1993). "The Animal Game". In Constantine, Larry (ed.). Infinite Loop: Stories About the Future by the People Creating It. San Francisco: Miller Freeman Books. pp. 221–242. ISBN 9780879302986. OCLC 30325522.
- — (August 1993). Dozois, Gardner (ed.). "A Hand in the Mirror". Isaac Asimov's Science Fiction. 17 (9). Davis Publications: 82–107. ISSN 1045-6414. OCLC 14585351.
  - Republished: — (1994). "A Hand in the Mirror". In Dozois, Gardner (ed.). Isaac Asimov's Cyberdreams. New York: Ace Books. ISBN 9780441000739. OCLC 30615777.
- — (1993). "Motherhood". Pulphouse. 2 (3). Eugene, OR: Pulphouse Pub.: 24–33. ISSN 2641-3655. OCLC 26663317.
- — (November 1993). Dozois, Gardner (ed.). "It Might be Sunlight". Isaac Asimov's Science Fiction. 17 (12 & 13). Davis Publications: 80–100. ISSN 1045-6414. OCLC 14585351. Republished separately in 2012: ISBN 9781480090316
- — (December 1993). Dozois, Gardner (ed.). "There is a Season". Isaac Asimov's Science Fiction. 17 (15). Davis Publications: 32–36. ISSN 1045-6414. OCLC 14585351.
- — (Summer 1994). "The Green". Expanse (3). Expanse Publications: 12–15. ISSN 0531-5468. OCLC 1568624.
- — (May 1995). "When Strangers Meet". In Bear, Greg (ed.). New Legends. New York: TOR. pp. 149–156. ISBN 9780312859305. OCLC 32872857.
- — (December 1995). "Multiply and Conquer". Information Technology & Libraries. 14 (4). Chicago: American Library Association: 231–235. ISSN 0730-9295. OCLC 300178407.
- — (1995). Knight, Damon (ed.). "The Jesus Construct". Pulphouse (18). Eugene, OR: Pulphouse Pub.: 11–20. ISSN 2641-3655. OCLC 26663317.
- — (December 1996). Dozois, Gardner (ed.). "The Angels' Share". Isaac Asimov's Science Fiction. 20 (12). Davis Publications: 86–108. ISSN 1045-6414. OCLC 14585351.
- — (June 1997). Dozois, Gardner (ed.). "Payback". Isaac Asimov's Science Fiction. 21 (6). Davis Publications: 94–109. ASIN B007SP2FTE. ISSN 1045-6414. OCLC 14585351.
- — (October 2011). "Mirror Test" (PDF). The Tomorrow Project Anthology: Conversations About the Future (PDF). Intel Corporation. Chapter 4, pages 55–103. ISBN 9781934053454. Archived from the original (PDF) on April 1, 2016.
- — (April 2012). "Biggest! Fan! Ever!". Uncle John's Bathroom Reader presents Flush Fiction: 88 Short-Short Stories You Can Read in a Single Sitting. Ashland, OR: Portable Press. pp. 126–131. ISBN 9781607106753. OCLC 849373108.
- — (April 2014). Hachigian, Jennifer Lynn (ed.). "Done". Lore. 2 (5). Greeble Graphics: 89–101. OCLC 730414926.
- — (May 2012). "Romance, with Mice". In Crisp, Quentin S; Isis, Justin (eds.). Dadaoism : an anthology. UK: Chômu Press. ISBN 9781907681141. OCLC 796785129.

=== Collections ===
- — (1993). Helmbrecht, Robert (ed.). Dark Descents: Fantastic Stories by Sonia Orin Lyris. Hazardous Press. This anthology contains the stories Descent, The Green, and Motherhood.
- — (2022). Better Selves, A Collection of SF&F Stories. Knotted Road Press. ISBN 9781644702987.

=== Nonfiction ===
- —; Brodie, Richard (March 19, 2008) [2003]. "Internet Virus Antidote". Meme Central.
- — (July 2004). "Buying Safely on the Internet". Computer Bits. Archived from the original on December 22, 2004.
- — (July 2010). "Practice for Real Life" (PDF). Courageous Creativity: 26–28. Archived (PDF) from the original on November 15, 2012.
- — (November 2010). Dodge, Renda (ed.). "Balance, Grace, and Humility". Line Zero. No. One. Seattle: Pink Fish Press.
- — (May 2011). Dodge, Renda (ed.). "The Dancer I am Becoming". Line Zero. No. Three. Seattle: Pink Fish Press. ISBN 9781453876886.

== See also ==
- High fantasy – Subgenre of fiction
- Multiverse (Magic: The Gathering) – Fictional universe
