= The Cursed Land (novel) =

1995 novel by Teri McLaren

- Author: Teri McLaren
- Language: English
- Genre: Fantasy/Magic: The Gathering
- Publisher: HarperPrism
- Publication date: 1995
- Publication place: United States
- ISBN: 0-06-105016-4
- Preceded by: Final Sacrifice
- Followed by: The Prodigal Sorcerer

The Cursed Land is a novel by Teri McLaren published by Harper Prism in 1995. It was one of the first novels set in the Magic: The Gathering universe.

== Plot summary ==
The Cursed Land is a Magic: The Gathering novel in which a mysterious trader comes to the island of Cridhe, where he befriends one of the inhabitants and convinces him to steal the power from the Clan Tree which provides magic for the people of the island. The plot centers on Aylith, guardian of memories tied to an ancient tree, and her uneasy alliance with Nazir, an unstable enemy figure, as they seek to restore balance to the world.

== Reception ==
Andy Butcher reviewed The Cursed Land for Arcane magazine, rating it a 5 out of 10 overall. Butcher comments that "It's not that The Cursed Land is badly written. It's actually quite enjoyable, and mercifully avoids drawing too heavily on the specifics of Magic: The Gathering of which it is a spin-off. It's just that you've probably read so much of it before. In fact, if you've ever roleplayed in a fantasy game, you've probably played a lot of it before..."

Michał Nowakowski reviewed the Polish translations of The Cursed Land and another, earlier, MtG novel (Arena) for Świat Gier Komputerowych. While he considers Arena a good novel, in contrast, The Cursed Land receives a more reserved assessment. While the reviewer acknowledges that the novel employs more overtly “literary” language than Arena, its loose connection to the Magic: The Gathering setting is seen as a significant drawback. The moral ambiguity of the opposing sides is noted as an interesting narrative choice, though undermined by a consistently predictable trajectory toward a happy ending. The reviewer’s main criticism is that the novel makes minimal use of recognizable elements from the card game, such as spells, creatures, artifacts, or coherent mana mechanics. As a result, it is described as a generic fantasy novel that only marginally rises above average and fails to meet the expectations of Magic: The Gathering fans. The review ultimately considers the book disappointing for readers interested specifically in fiction that meaningfully engages with the game’s universe.

== Analysis ==
The Cursed Land, along with the rest of the early HarperCollins-published Magic novels, was later declared non-canonical by Wizards of the Coast following a reboot of the franchise’s fictional continuity.

== Collectible card ==
The book contained a coupon redeemable for a promotional card from the game; it could be redeemed for any of the five previous promos included with previous MtG books published by Harper Prism (Arena and Sewers of Estark, Windseeker Centaur, Giant Badger and Mana Crypt).
