= Jeff Gomez =

American film producer

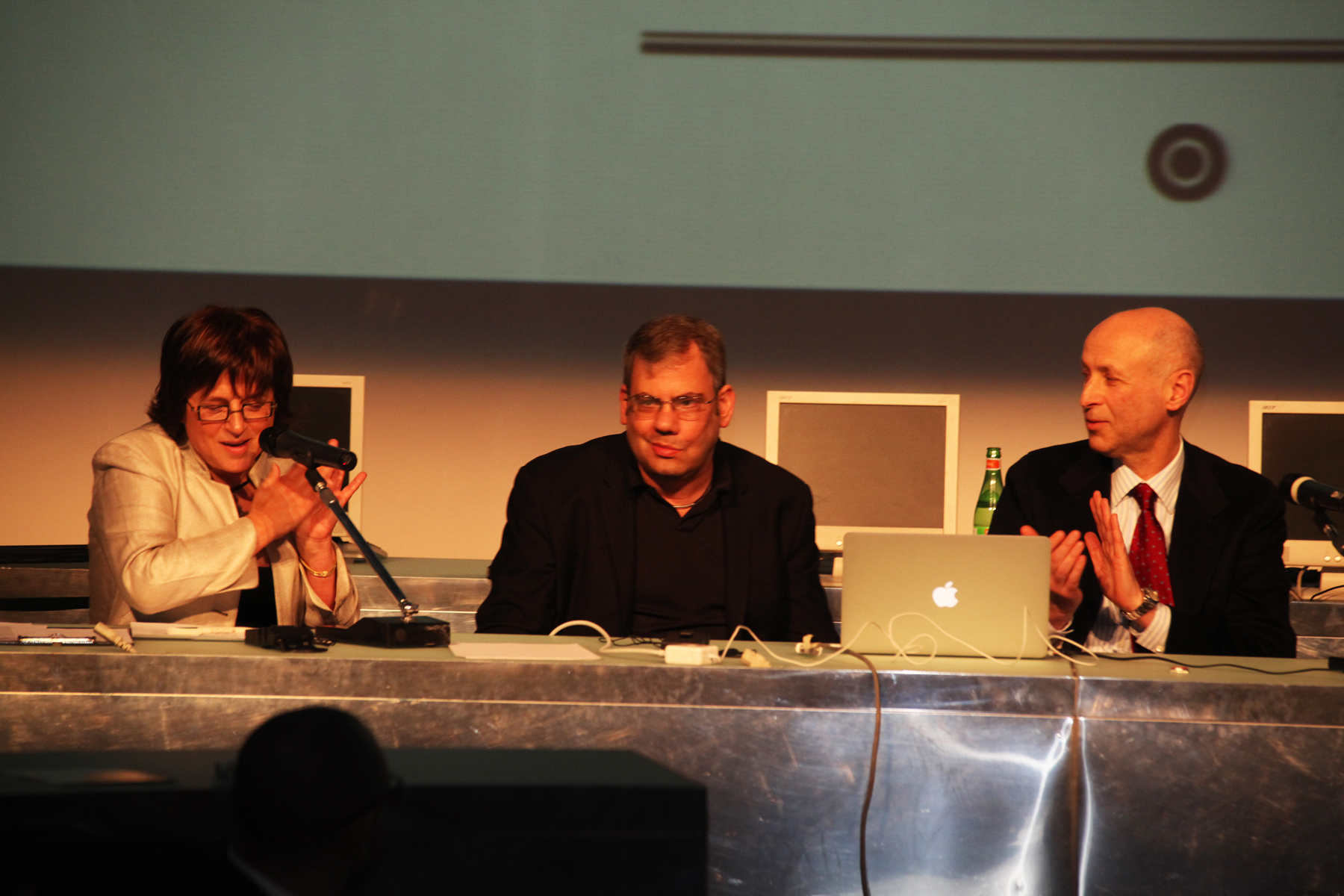
- Born: New York City, New York, United States
- Occupations: Writer, Transmedia Producer
- Spouse: Chrys Art

Jeff Gomez (born in New York City, New York, United States) is a writer and transmedia producer in the fantasy, science fiction and young adult genres.

== Early career ==
At Palladium Books, Gomez worked in various roles, including as an editor.

Gomez was a producer and writer for Valiant Comics (more recently known as Acclaim Comics). During his time with Acclaim Entertainment, he also worked on adapting its superhero characters for games on Nintendo and PlayStation systems. Acclaim's Turok: Dinosaur Hunter and Turok 2: Seeds of Evil were both key projects of his.

== Starlight Runner ==
As CEO of Starlight Runner, Gomez has worked with The Walt Disney Company (Pirates of the Caribbean, Fairies, Tron Legacy), 20th Century Fox (James Cameron's Avatar), Sony Pictures Entertainment (Men in Black 3, The Amazing Spider-Man 2), Coca-Cola (Happiness Factory), Mattel (Hot Wheels animation universe), Showtime (Dexter), Microsoft (Halo), Hasbro (Transformers), Nickelodeon (Teenage Mutant Ninja Turtles), Ubisoft (Splinter Cell), Pepperidge Farm (Goldfish) and others as a transmedia producer.

Gomez is a writer and transmedia producer for the super heroic universe of Lucha Libre, an innovation of Mexico's AAA wrestling league for Mark Burnett's OneThree Media, in association with Robert Rodriguez and Factory Made Ventures for the Comcast El Rey television network. He has also been hired to reboot Ultraman.

Gomez was selected by Details as one of the magazine's 2010 mavericks for his contributions toward shifting the business and artistic paradigm in the global film and entertainment industry. He was designated a Hollywood "Power Player" by Variety in January 2012. He has also been awarded the Director's Coin for Excellence by the United States Special Operations Command/InterAgency Task Force for his transmedia work on asymmetrical conflict and international crisis narratives in the field. He was also extensively quoted in Forbes magazine's 2017 article, "Transmedia Will Shape The Future Of Hollywood And Fortune 500 Firms".

In the US, Gomez champions the concerns of young people with his "Never Surrender!" inspirational seminars and curricula.
