= What Were You Thinking? =

Party board game

- Designers: Richard Garfield
- Publishers: Wizards of the Coast
- Publication: 1998
- Genres: Board game
- Players: 4+
- Playing time: 30 minutes
- Age range: 10+

What Were You Thinking? is a party board game designed by Richard Garfield and published by Wizards of the Coast in 1998. In 2016, the game's mechanics were reimplemented in Hive Mind.

== Gameplay ==
The game is designed for four or more players. One of the players spins a spinner and reads a question on a card matching the spun color. Each player writes what they think will be the most used answers to a question by other players until the timer runs out. Players will read their answers. If someone's answer matches another's, they will receive as many points as players with the same answer in the game. The player with the fewest points will move their piece one square up the penalty track. If someone gets to the eight square, they will lose the game. The game continues until there is one player left.

== Reception ==
The reviewer from the online second volume of Pyramid wrote "Quick -- Think of five planets. Now call out to your co-worker, friend, or significant other. Ask them to think of five planets. Now compare your answers. Did you get any the same?* If so, this game may be for you."

Eric Mortensen reviewed What Were You Thinking? on Geeky Hobbies. Eric commented that "What Were You Thinking? is a decent party game but it fails to really differentiate itself from so many other party games."

In 1998, What Were You Thinking? won the Origins Award for the Best Abstract Board Game.
