= DungeonWorld (play-by-mail game) =

Play-by-mail fantasy role-playing game

- Other names: Dungeon
- Designers: Steve Tierney and team
- Publishers: Madhouse USA
- Years active: 1998 to current
- Genres: fantasy role-playing game
- Languages: English
- Players: unlimited
- Playing time: unlimited
- Materials required: Instructions, order sheets, turn results, paper, pencil
- Media type: Play-by-mail
- Website: http://www.madcentral.co.uk/dungeonworld/adventures/

DungeonWorld is a play-by-mail game published by Madhouse USA. It is an open-ended, computer moderated, play-by-mail (PBM) role-playing game. Originally published as Dungeon in 1998 after playtesting, the publisher changed the name to DungeonWorld in 1999 to reflect the non-dungeon aspects of the game. In 2001, Madhouse increased the scope of the game. Players start in the fictional world of Myriad in a marketplace in the city of Berney. Various dungeons are available for players to explore and combat monsters. Players have various characters available, such as magic users, rogues, and priests. Multiple positions are also available, such as Adventurer, Trader, Monster Tribe, and Estate. The game won the Origins Awards for "Best New Play-by-Mail Game of 1998" and placed No. 1 in Flagship's "Adventure" game category in 2002 and 2003.

== History and development ==
DungeonWorld is an open-ended role-playing PBM game of medium complexity. It is computer moderated, open-ended, and ran on a game engine called "Nexus". Madhouse designed it originally as the game Dungeon on the heels of their successful game Necromancer. It drew from Steve Tierney's Dungeons & Dragons experiences as a teenager. The designers' intent was to make "the largest computer-mod Adventure PBM in the world".

It completed alpha test in 1998 before beginning its beta playtest. In the July–August 1999 issue of Flagship, the editors stated that Madhouse had changed the name to DungeonWorld to reflect its broad setting beyond dungeons.

By 2001, Madhouse stated that the game was expanded and was "the world's largest fantasy adventure PBM". They added 20,000 new magic items and over 2,000 new monsters. By 2003, the game was also available for play by email (PBeM).

== Gameplay ==
The game takes place in the city of Bereny within the fictional world of Myriad. Players could choose various positions, including the original Adventurer, Trader, Monster Tribe, and Estate. There are twelve monster races available, half good and half evil. Multiple dungeons are available, which players can enter and explore from the land above. Combat with monster denizens is central to dungeon exploration. The game features thousands of non-player character monster types including Goblins, Hobgoblins, Dark Elves, Orcs, Trolls, Ogres, Zombies, Skeletons, Ghosts, Vampires and Dragons, among others.

Players begin the game in a marketplace where fighting is prohibited which is near the game's Central Dungeon.

Players are allowed ten characters per position, each of which can be issued more than a dozen orders per turn. Magic is available in the game, employed by enchanters and enchantresses, while Priests employ magical healing powers. Rogues have abilities such as picking pockets, moving in the shadows, and picking locks.

== Reception ==
Dungeon won the Origins Awards for "Best New Play-by-Mail Game of 1998". In the December 2002 – January 2003 issue of Flagship, DungonWorld placed No. 1 in the "Adventure" category for the second year in a row. Reviewer Dave Harris thought that DungeonWorld would appeal to strategy gamers as well.

== See also ==
- List of play-by-mail games

== Bibliography ==
- Editors (May–June 1998). "The Spokesmen Speak: Adventure Games: Dungeon". Flagship. No. 73. pp. 11–12.
- Editors (July–August 1999). "The Spokesmen Speak: Adventure Games". Flagship. No. 80. p. 9.
- Editors (September–October 2001). "The Spokesmen Speak: Adventure Games". Flagship. No. 80. p. 5.
- Editors (December 2002 – January 2003). "The Flagship PBM Ratings 2002". Flagship. No. 100. p. 10.
- Harris, Dave (December 2002 – January 2003). "DungeonWorld: Just a Role-Playing Game?". Flagship. No. 100. pp. 38–39.
- London, Andy (January–February 1999). "Test Flight: A Dungeon Diary". Flagship. No. 77. pp. 4–5.
- "Origins Award Winners (1998)". Academy of Adventure Gaming, Arts & Designs. Archived from the original on 2007-10-31.
- Tierney, Steve (July–August 1998). "Ghost in the Machine: Dungeon; The Making of an Adventure". Flagship. No. 74. p. 43.
- Tierney, Steve (May–June 1998). "A Preview of Dungeon". Paper Mayhem. No. 90. pp. 26–28.
