= Shattered Chains =

1995 fantasy novel

- Cover art by Kevin Murphy
- Author: Clayton Emery
- Cover artist: Kevin Murphy
- Language: English
- Series: Greensleeves Trilogy
- Genre: Fantasy/Magic: The Gathering
- Publisher: HarperPrism
- Publication date: 1995
- Publication place: United States
- ISBN: 0-06-105419-4
- Preceded by: Whispering Woods
- Followed by: Final Sacrifice

Shattered Chains is a novel by Clayton Emery published by Boxtree in 1995. It was the second book of the Greensleeves Trilogy, following Whispering Woods and followed by Final Sacrifice.

== Plot summary ==
Shattered Chains is a Magic: The Gathering (M:TG) novel in which the novice mage Greensleeves and her brother Gull the Woodcutter put together an army to fight evil wizards who are manipulating magic for their personal gain. An artifact shaped like a stone helmet may hold the key of how to defeat the wizards.

The heroes of an earlier book set in the same universe, Arena, Garth and Rakel, appear in Shattered Chains. Rakel was sent from Benalia to assassinate Gull, but ends up joining his cause.

== Publication history ==
With the continued success of the collectible card game M:TG, Wizards of the Coast decided to monetize the product further by publishing a series of novels that used the M:TG milieu. Three of these were the Greensleeves Trilogy written by Clayton Emery in 1995. Shattered Chains is the second in the trilogy, preceded by Whispering Woods and followed by Final Sacrifice.

== Reception ==
In Issue 4 of the British games magazine Arcane, Paul Pettengale was unimpressed, noting, "The writing style is poor, the plot mediocre and the only joy to be gleaned from it is that of relishing the profound lack of style which the author possesses." Pettengale concluded by giving it a poor rating of only 3 out of 10.

In Issue 219 of Dragon (July 1995), John C. Bunnell called this book "a serious mistake by any measure" and noted that the tone of this book and its predecessor Arena were "sharply different." Bunnell advised, "Fans of the Magic: the Gathering milieu should be patient; sources suggest that much better material than this is forthcoming."

In Issue 188 of Vector, Lynne Bispham reviewed this book and its sequel, Final Sacrifice, and was not impressed, writing, "Presumably they are aimed at younger readers, for their vocabulary and plots can only be described as unsophisticated; but why this age group (say, 10–13 years) should have such uninspiring fantasy inflicted on them is anyone's guess." Bispham concluded, "Unfortunately, even the triumph of Good over Evil is not enough to make these books a worthwhile read."

== Analysis ==
Shattered Chains, along with the rest of the early HarperCollins-published Magic novels, was later declared non-canonical by Wizards of the Coast following a reboot of the franchise’s fictional continuity.

== Collectible card ==
The book contained a coupon redeemable for a promotional card from the game that has since become a rare collectible, although the sources vary on which card was available. According to one source, it was an alternate art Giant Badger. According to other sources, it was Windseeker Centaur.
