= Final Sacrifice =

Novel by Clayton Emery

- Author: Clayton Emery
- Language: English
- Series: Greensleeves Trilogy
- Genre: Fantasy/Magic: The Gathering
- Publisher: HarperPrism
- Publication date: 1995
- Publication place: United States
- ISBN: 0-06-105420-8
- Preceded by: Shattered Chains
- Followed by: The Cursed Land

Final Sacrifice is a Magic: The Gathering novel by Clayton Emery published by Boxtree in 1995. It was the third and final book of the Greensleeves Trilogy, following Shattered Chains.

== Plot summary ==
Final Sacrifice is a Magic: The Gathering novel in which the mage Greensleeves, now risen to the rank of archdruid, and her brother Gull, oppose Towser and his army and stolen artifacts. They battle Towser and his minions (orcs, goblin, phantasms and like) while searching for means to defeat their enemy, eventually triumphing.

== Reception ==
Anderson-Forsyth reviewed Final Sacrifice for Arcane magazine, rating it a 7 out of 10 overall. Forsyth comments that "This book adds a rich and detailed background to the Magic universe, and is an enjoyable and unpredictable read. An additional incentive is the bonus of a limited edition Magic card not generally available – a very tempting offer for any collector."

In Issue 188 of Vector, Lynne Bispham reviewed this book and its previous installment, Shattered Chains, and was not impressed, writing, "Presumably they are aimed at younger readers, for their vocabulary and plots can only be described as unsophisticated; but why this age group (say, 10–13 years) should have such uninspiring fantasy inflicted on them is anyone's guess." Bispham concluded, "Unfortunately, even the triumph of Good over Evil is not enough to make these books a worthwhile read.".

== Analysis ==
Final Sacrifice, along with the rest of the early HarperCollins-published Magic novels, was later declared non-canonical by Wizards of the Coast following a reboot of the franchise's fictional continuity.

== Collectible card ==
The book contained a coupon redeemable for a promotional card from the game: Mana Crypt; it was considered the strongest of the promotional cards included with the novels and used in tournament play.
