= Tapestries (novel) =

Collection of Magic: The Gathering by Harper Prism (1995)

Tapestries is a collection of Magic: The Gathering short stories published by Harper Prism in 1995.

== Plot summary ==
Tapestries is a short story collection featuring seventeen stories that take place in the worlds of Magic: The Gathering.

== Reception ==
Ben Rodd reviewed Tapestries for Arcane magazine, rating it a 5 out of 10 overall. Rodd comments that "Don't be put off it you have never shuffled a Magic deck: but then again, don't expect to gain anything from it if you have."

== Reviews ==
- Review by John C. Bunnell (1995) in Dragon Magazine, #221, September 1995
- Review by Don D'Ammassa (1996) in Science Fiction Chronicle, #189 May/June 1996
