= Clayton Emery =

American author (born 1953)

- Born: December 26, 1953 (age 72); Bethesda, Maryland, U.S.
- Occupations: Author; screenwriter
- Children: 1
- Writing career
- Genres: Mystery fiction; fantasy

Clayton Emery (born December 26, 1953, in Bethesda, Maryland) is an American mystery and fantasy author and a screenwriter.

== Works ==
Clayton Emery has worked as a blacksmith, dishwasher, schoolteacher in Australia, carpenter, zookeeper, farmhand, land surveyor, volunteer firefighter, award-winning and technical writer.

Clayton Emery wrote the Forgotten Realms novels Sword Play (May 1996), Dangerous Games (November 1996), Mortal Consequences (January 1998), and Star of Cursrah (February 1999), and the stories "Forged in Fire" for the anthology Realms of the Deep (March 2000) and "Night School" for the anthology The Halls of Stormweather (July 2000).

His novels based on Magic: The Gathering include Whispering Woods, Shattered Chains, and Final Sacrifice in 1995, Johan and Jedit in 2001, and Hazezon in 2002.

Emery wrote the "Robin and Marian" medieval stories and "Joseph Fisher" stories in Ellery Queen Mystery Magazine and Muzzleloader Magazine. He wrote the book Father-Daughter Disaster! in 1997 based on The Secret World of Alex Mack, and also The Tale of the Campfire Vampires for the Are You Afraid of the Dark? book series. His other work includes Tales of Robin Hood.

In the mid-1990s, Emery wrote two Shadow World books, The Burning Goddess and City of Assassins, under the pseudonym Ian Hammell.

Clayton Emery wrote the screenplay for the television pilot, "The Republic", directed by Ken Penders.

== Personal life ==
Emery is married with a son. He lives in Portsmouth, New Hampshire.
