= Świat Gier Komputerowych =

Polish video game magazine

- Categories: Video gaming magazine
- Circulation: 50,000
- First issue: 14 December 1992; 33 years ago
- Final issue: July 2003
- Country: Poland
- ISSN: 1230-8773

Świat Gier Komputerowych (English: Computer Games World) was a Polish video gaming magazine published from 1992 to 2003.

== History ==
Its first issue was released on 14 December 1992 as an addition to the Amiga magazine Amigowiec (deemed the 8-page 0th issue). The permanent editorial team consisted of about 15 people. The first editor-in-chief was Mirosław Domosud, later replaced by Piotr Pieńkowski, who held this position until the paper was discontinued. After the first dozen or so issues it developed a distinct identity in the Polish marked, and was intended mainly for older players, written in a more formal style than competitors such as Top Secret and CD-Action. In February 1997, the 50th issue was issued, while April 2001 saw the hundredth issue be published. The magazine celebrated its tenth anniversary in February 2003, being the first such magazine on the Polish market to reach this milestone. The last issue appeared in July 2003 as a double. The decision was due to the unsatisfactory sales of the magazine, around 50,000 copies per month. After its dissolution, an attempt was made to revive the paper as Nowy Świat Gier Komputerowych, however this only lasted for two months due to a trademark challenge.
