= List of collectible card games =

This is a list of known collectible card games. Unless otherwise noted, all dates listed are the North American release date.

This contains games backed by physical cards; computer game equivalents are generally called digital collectible card games and are catalogued at List of digital collectible card games.

== List ==
Game Title	Launch Year	Publisher / Developer	Publication Status
.hack//Enemy	2003	Decipher, Inc.	No
007 Spy Cards	2008	GE Fabbri	No
24: Trading Card Game	2007	Press Pass, Inc.	No
7th Sea	1999	Alderac Entertainment Group	No
Adventure Time Card Wars	2014	Cryptozoic Entertainment	No
Afterworld	2016	Panini	No
Age of Empires II Expandable Card Game	2000	Journeyman Press/The United States Playing Card Company	No
AGE: The Amazing Goal Era	2009	RCS MediaGroup	No
Ah! My Goddess	2009	Upper Deck	No
Air TCG	2001	Leaf fight TCG	No
Aldnoah Zero	2015	Movic	No
Alice x Cross	2008	Bushiroad	No
Alien Attax	2013	Topps	No
Aliens Predator Customizable Card Game	1997	Precedence Entertainment/HarperCollins/HarperPrism/Zehrapushu/ZI Games	No
Allegiance: War of Factions	2004	Lucid Raven Productions	No
Álomfogó	2007	Beholder Kft.	No
Alpha Clash	2023	Rising Empire Studios	Yes
Alteil	2004	?	No
Altered	2024	Equinox	No
American Idol Collectible Card Game	2004	Fleer/SkyBox International	No
Animo	2019	Animo Games	Yes
Ange-Vierges	2013	media Factory	No
Angelic Layer	2001?	Amada Printing/Clamp	No
Ani-Mayhem	1996	Pioneer Entertainment/Pioneer Animation	No
Animum Saxis	2001?	Showmans	No
Aniołowie	2005	Wydawnictwo Wieszcze	No
Aquarian Age	2000	Broccoli	No
Arc the Lad Generation	2004	Sony	No
Arcadia	1996	White Wolf Publishing	No
Arcadia Tribe	2015	Kadokawa	No
Arcana Strikes	1997	?	No
Arkna: Trading Card Game	2010	IguanaBee	No
Asura System	2004	Terranetz	No
Austin Powers Collectible Card Game	1999	Decipher, Inc.	No
Avatar: The Last Airbender Trading Card Game	2006	Upper Deck	No
B B-daman'	1999?	Takara	No
Babylon 5 Collectible Card Game	1997	Precedence Entertainment	No
Bakugan: Battle Brawlers (Trading Card Game)	2010	Giochi Preziosi	No
Banemaster: The Adventure	1995	Chessex	No
Bankett!!	2004?	?	No
Baseball 3010	2002	ImagiNation Sports, LLC.	No
Baseball Heroes	2005	Konami	No
Bass Mania X	2000	Creek	No
Battle Spirits	2009	Bandai	Yes
Battlelords	1995	New Millennium Entertainment	No
Battlestar Galactica Collectible Card Game	2006	WizKids	No
BattleTech	1996	Wizards of the Coast	No
Battlez	2004	Illektron	No
Beast Clans	2017	Beast Clans LLC	Yes
Behind	2003	Fishtank	No
Bella Sara	2005	Hidden City Games/Conceptcard	No
Ben 10	2007	Bandai	No
Berserk	2003 (Note: Russian release date)/ 2023 (Note: Original edition out of print in 2015; relaunched in 2023)	Fantasy World, Inc./Hobby World	Yes
Berserk: Heroes	2015	Hobby World	Yes
Beyblade Collectible Card Game	2001	Takara	No
Beyblade Trading Card Game	2003	Decipher, Inc.	No
Bible Battles Trading Card Game	2008	Bible Battles Trading Card Game, LLC	Yes
Bionicle: Quest for the Masks	2001	Upper Deck	No
Bleach Soul Card Battle	2004	Bandai	No
Bleach Trading Card Game	2007	Score Entertainment	No
Blood Wars	1995	TSR	No
Bratz Fashion Party Fever Game	2004	Upper Deck	No
Buffy the Vampire Slayer Collectible Card Game	2001	Score Entertainment	No
Build Divide TCG	2020 (JP Only)	Bandai Namco.	Yes
Bumblings - The funtasy card game	2014	Gernilex Bt.	No
C-23	1998	Wizards of the Coast	No
Call of Cthulhu: Collectible Card Game	2004	Fantasy Flight Games	No
Cannabeast Trading Card Game	2022	Cannabeast Gaming	Yes
Captain Tsubasa Trading Card Game	2002	Konami	No
Cardcaptors Trading Card Game	2001	Upper Deck	No
Cardfight!! Vanguard	2011	Bushiroad	Yes
Case Closed Trading Card Game	2005	Score Entertainment	No
The Caster Chronicles TCG	2017	Force of Will Ltd.	Yes
Champions	1995	F.X. Schmid/Gibsons Games	No
Chaos TCG	2009	Bushiroad	No
Chaotic Trading Card Game	2007	4Kids Entertainment	No
City of Heroes Collectible Card Game	2005	AEG	No
CLAMP in CARDLAND	2007	Upper Deck	No
Club Penguin Trading Cards	2008	Disney	No
Codename: Kids Next Door Trading Card Game	2005	Wizards of the Coast	No
Combat Cards	2006	self-published	No
Conan Collectible Card Game	2006	Comic Images/Tempo Games	No
Corunea	2008	Insight Games	No
Cookie Run: Braverse	2024	Devsisters	Yes
Cricket Attax	2017	Topps	Yes
The Crow	1995	Target Games/Heartbreaker Hobbies	No
Cryptid Camp Trading Card Game	2024	Cryptid Camp	Yes
Crystalicum: Kryształowa Gra Karciana	2005	Wolf Fang P.H.	No
Cyberpunk The Collectible Card Game	2003	Social Games/ImageNative Worlds, Inc./R. Talsorian Games, Inc.	No
Daikaijuu Monogatari: The Miracle of the Zone	1997	Amada Printing	No
Dark Age	1996	FPG, Inc.	No
Dark Eden	1997	Target Games/Heartbreaker Hobbies	No
Dark Force (card game)	1994	Schmidt Spiele	No
Dark Millennium	2005	Sabertooth Games	No
Deadlands: Lost Colony - Showdown	2000	Pinnacle Entertainment Group	No
Death Note Trading Card Game	2008	Konami	No
Devacurse Trading Card Game	2007	Gandharvas Studio	No
Die Drachenjäger Sammelkartenspiel	2006	Toggo	No
Digi-Battle	2000	Bandai	No
Digimon Digi-Battle Card Game	1999	Bandai	No
Digimon Card Game	2021	Bandai	Yes
Digimon D-Tector	2002	Bandai	No
Dimension 0	2005	Broccoli	No
Dinosaur King	2008	Upper Deck	No
Disney Lorcana	2023	Ravensburger	Yes
Dixie	1994	Columbia Games	No
Doctor Who – Battles in Time	2006	GE Fabbri	No
Doctor Who Monster Invasion	2011	BBC Worldwide	No
Doctor Who: The Collectible Trading Card Game	1996	M.M.G. Ltd.	No
Don: Continuing Criminal Enterprise	2002	MythIntentions, LLC	No
Donkey Kong card game	1999	Nintendo	No
Doomtrooper	1995	Target Games	No
Doomtown	1998	Five Rings Publishing Group/Wizards of the Coast/AEG	No
The Dozens	2005	Topps	No
Dragon Ball Collectible Card Game	2008	Bandai	No
Dragon Ball Super Card Game Masters	2017	Bandai	Yes
Dragon Ball Super Card Game Fusion World	2024	Bandai	Yes
Dragon Ball Z Collectible Card Game	2005	Score Entertainment	No
Dragon Booster Trading Card Game	2004	Score Entertainment	No
Dragoborne: Rise to Supremacy	2017	Bushiroad, Ltd.	No
Dragon Dynasty Collectible Card Game	2001	Romancing Cathay	No
Dragon Quest TCG	2000 (JP Only)	Enix/Tenky	No
The Dragon's Wrath	1995	Naipes Heraclio Fournier	No
Draim Arena	2007	Draim	No
Dredd: The Card Game	2000	Round Table Productions	No
Duel Masters Trading Card Game	2002/2004	Wizards of the Coast/Takara	Yes
Dune	1997	Last Unicorn Games/Five Rings Publishing Group/Wizards of the Coast	No
Eagles	1995	Columbia Games	No
Echelons of Fire	1995	Medallion Simulations	No
Echelons of Fury	1995	Medallion Simulations	No
Echoes of Astra	2026	Parhelion Studio Co.	Yes
Election Quest Collectible Card Game	2004	Bro! Novelties	No
Elementeo	2009	Alchemist Empire	No
Elestrals	2022	Elestrals LLC	Yes
Epic Battles	2005	Score Entertainment	No
Eve: The Second Genesis	2006	CCP Games	No
Exodus The Trading Card Game	2014	Existence Games	Yes
EooT Tactical Card Game	2024	Ryan Kelly	Yes
The Eye of Judgment	2007	SCE Japan	No
Fantasy Adventures	1996	Mayfair Games	No
Fastbreak	1996	WildStorm Productions	No
FemWarriors	2002	N Communications	No
Fight Klub	2009	Decipher, Inc.	No
Final Fantasy Trading Card Game	2011	Hobby Japan/Last Level/Square Enix/Neo Productions Unlimited	Yes
Final Twilight TCG	2004	Neo Productions Unlimited	No
Final War Tactical Card Game	2017	Games Lab	Yes
Fire Emblem 0 (Cipher)	2015	Nintendo/Intelligent Systems	No
Firestorm Tactical Card Game	2001	Third World Games	No
Flesh and Blood	2019	Legend Story Studios	Yes
Flights of Fantasy	1994	Destini Productions Inc.	No
Football Champions	2001	Wizards of the Coast	No
Football Resurrection	2008	Portal Games Ltd.	No
Force of Will	2012	Force of Will Ltd.	Yes
Fullmetal Alchemist: Alchemic Card Battle TCG	2004	Bandai	No
Fullmetal Alchemist Trading Card Game	2005	RC2 Inc./JoyRide Studios	No
Future Card Buddyfight	2013	Bushiroad	No
G.I. Joe Trading Card Game	2004	Wizards of the Coast	No
Galactic Empires	1994	Companion Games	No
A Game of Thrones	2002	Fantasy Flight Games	No
The Garbage Gang	2008	Topps	No
Gasaraki Mission Director	1999	Bandai	No
Gate Ruler	2021	Daiyu Inc.	Yes
Geek Fight!	2008	Diving Dragon Games	Yes
Gem Blenders	2024	Gem Blenders	Yes
Generals Order	2007	Strategy Entertainment	Yes
Genius invokation TCG physical version	2024 (CN Only)	miHoYo/ShiningSoul	Yes
Gensō Suikoden Card Stories	2001 (JP Only)	Konami	No
Godzilla Card Game	2025	Bushiroad	Yes
Grand Archive	2023	Weebs of the Shore LLC	Yes
Gridiron Fantasy Football	1995	Upper Deck	No
Guardians	1995	FPG, Inc.	No
Gundam Card Game	2025	Bandai	Yes
Gundam Cross War	2015	Bandai	No
Gundam M.S. War Trading Card Game	2001	Bandai	No
Gundam War: Mobile Suit Gundam the Card Game	2005	Bandai	No
Gundam War Nex-A	2011	Bandai	No
Gwiezdna Kohorta (AKA: Stargate Kohorta)	2005	Wydawnictwo Imperium	No
Harry Potter Trading Card Game	2001	Wizards of the Coast	No
Hatalom Kártyái Kártyajáték (AKA Power Cards Card Game)	1995 (Note: Hungarian release date)	Beholder Kft.	Yes
Hayate the Combat Butler TCG	2009	Konami	No
Hecatomb	2005	Wizards of the Coast	No
Hercules: The Legendary Journeys	1998	Wizards of the Coast	No
Heresy: Kingdom Come	1995	Last Unicorn Games	No
Hero Attax	2016?	Topps	Yes
High Stakes Drifter	2005	WizKids	No
Highlander: The Card Game	1995	Thunder Castle Games	No
Highlander: The Card Game 2nd Edition	2006	Rapidpod	No
Home Team Heroes: The Football Card Game	2025	Home Team Games	Yes
Horus Heresy	2003	Sabertooth Games	No
Hot Wheels Acceleracers Collectible Card Game	2005	Mattel	No
Humaliens Collectible Card Game	2003	AEG	No
HumanKind	2005	SALO	No
HunTik	2009	Upper Deck	No
Hyborian Gates	1995	CARDZ	No
Illuminati: New World Order	1994	Steve Jackson Games	No
Imajica	1997	Harper Prism/Clive Barker	No
Inazuma Eleven TCG	2008 (JP Only)	Tomy	No
Initial D Collectible Card Game	2003	AEG	No
Inuyasha Trading Card Game	2004	Score Entertainment	No
Invizimals	2013	Panini	No
James Bond 007	1995	Target Games/Heartbreaker Hobbies	No
Jedi Knights Trading Card Game	2001	Decipher, Inc.	No
Jyhad (AKA Vampire: The Eternal Struggle)	1994	Wizards of the Coast/White Wolf Publishing, Inc./Black Chantry	Yes
Káosz Galaktika Kártyajáték	1999	Beholder Kft.	No
Kabal	1995	MultiSim	No
Kaijudo	2012	Wizards of the Coast	No
Ken il Guerriero: Gioco di Carte Collezionabili	1995	Alchemia	No
Kiba Trading Card Game	2006	Upper Deck	No
Killer Instinct	1996	Topps	No
Kingdom Hearts Trading Card Game	2007	Fantasy Flight Games	No
Kiválasztottak, a M.A.G.U.S. kártyajáték	1997 (Note: Hungarian release date)	Valhalla Páholy Kft/CCG Art Kft/Két Mágus Kft/Delta Vision Kft	Yes
Knights of the Zodiac Collectible Card Game (AKA Saint Seiya in Japan)	2004	Bandai/Amada Printing	No
Kult	1995	Target Games/Heartbreaker Hobbies	No
Langrisser	1999	NCS	No
The Last Crusade	1995	Pinnacle Entertainment Group	No
Leaf fight TCG	1999	Tea Ice Tokyo	No
Legend of the Burning Sands	1998	Wizards of the Coast	No
Legend of the Five Rings	1995	Five Rings Publishing Group/Wizards of the Coast/AEG	No
Lego: Ninjago Spinjitzu Card Game	2016	Blue Ocean Entertainment/Burda Publishing Polska	No
Level Neo	2014	Movic	No
Lightseekers Trading Card Game	2017	PlayFusion Ltd	No
Looney Tunes Trading Card Game	2000	Wizards of the Coast	No
The Lord of the Rings Trading Card Game	2001	Decipher, Inc.	No
Love Live! School Idol Collection	2016 (JP Only)	Bushiroad	No
Love Live! Official Card Game	2025 (JP Only)	Bushiroad	Yes
Luck & Logic	2016	Bushiroad	No
Lycèe Trading Card Game	2005	SilverBlitz	Yes
Magi-Nation Duel	2000	Interactive Imagination	No
Magic: The Gathering	1993	Wizards of the Coast	Yes
MapleStory Trading Card Game	2007	Wizards of the Coast	No
Marvel Superstars	2010	Upper Deck	No
Marvel Ultimate Battles	2008	Upper Deck	No
Match Attax	2007	Topps	No
Mazika Party	2021 (JP Only)	Takara Tomy	No
Medabots	2002	Score Entertainment	No
MegaMan: NT Warrior Trading Card Game	2004	Decipher, Inc.	No
Meta X (Note: At least three expansions using the Meta X game engine have been released: Batman, Green Lantern, and Justice League.)	2017	Panini	No
MetaZoo	2020/2025	MetaZoo Games LLC. (originally), MetaTwo Enterprises / GameQbator Labs (currently)	Yes
Middle-earth Collectible Card Game	1995	Iron Crown Enterprises	No
Mighty Beanz Trading Card Game	2004	Spin Master	No
Million Arthur TCG	2016	Square Enix	No
The Mission	2002	Ezekiel Limited	Yes
MLB Showdown	2000	Wizards of the Coast	No
Monster Collection	1997	Group SNE	No
Monster Farm Battle Card	1999	Tecmo	No
Monster Magic	1995	Trio Toys	No
The Monster Maker Trading Card Game: Resurrection	2001	Epoch	No
Monster Rancher Collectible Card Game	2000	Artbox Entertainment	No
Monster Tykes	2007	Rapid POD Printing	No
Monsuno	2012	Topps	No
Monty Python and the Holy Grail Collectible Card Game	1996	Kenzer & Company	No
Mortal Kombat Kard Game	1996	Brady Games	No
My Little Pony Card Game	2026	KAYOU	Yes
My Little Pony Collectible Card Game	2013	Enterplay	No
Mystical Empire	2005	Northeast Games, Inc.	No
Mythos	1996	Chaosium	No
Myths and Legends	2000	Salo S.A / Klu	Yes
Naruto Collectible Card Game	2006	Bandai	No
NBA Adrenalyn XL	2010	Panini Games	No
NBA Showdown	2002	Wizards of the Coast	No
Neon Genesis Evangelion: The Card Game	1998	Bandai	No
Neopets Battledome Trading Card Game	2024	Upper Deck	Yes
Neopets Trading Card Game	2003	Wizards of the Coast	No
Nerve	1999	Cell Entertainment AB	No
Netrunner	1996	Wizards of the Coast	No
NFL Adrenalyn XL	2010	Panini Games	No
NFL Showdown	2002	Wizards of the Coast	No
The Nightmare Before Christmas Trading Card Game	2005	NECA	No
Number Busters	2009	Little Tikes	No
Oligarchy	2016	Entropic Games	No
On the Edge	1994	Atlas Games	No
One-On-One Hockey Challenge Collectible Card Game	1997	Playoff Inc	No
One Piece Collectible Card Game	2003	Bandai	No
One Piece Card Game	2022	Bandai	Yes
Ophidian 2350	2003	SkyBox International/Fleer	No
Oshi Push	2024	Japanime Games	Yes
OverPower	1995/2024	Fleer/Marvel Interactive	Yes
Palworld Official Card Game	2026	Bushiroad	Yes
Perry Rhodan Sammelkartenspiel	1996	Fanpro/Between the Stars	Yes
Pez Card Game	2000	U.S. Games Systems	No
Pirates of the Caribbean Trading Card Game	2006	Upper Deck	No
Pk cards	2008	PKXL Cards, Inc.	No
Pokémon Trading Card Game	1996	Wizards of the Coast/The Pokémon Company	Yes
Power Rangers Action Card Game	2013	Bandai	No
Power Rangers Collectible Card Game	2008	Bandai	No
PowerCardz	1995	Caliber Games Systems	No
Precious Memories TCG	2011?	Kadokawa	Yes
Prince of Tennis TCG	2002	Konami	No
Prism Connect TCG	2011	Ensky/Movic	No
Project: Utopia	2009	Dragstarr Games	No
Queen's Blade: The Duel	2008	Mega House	No
Quest for the Grail	1995	Stone Ring Games/Horizon Games	No
QuickStrike	2006	Upper Deck	No
Racial Wars	2012	Pentakl Publishing	No
Racing Challenge	2000	Wizards of the Coast/White Wolf Publishing, Inc.	No
Rage	1995	White Wolf Publishing	No
Ragnarok: Dawn Of The Heavens' Massacre	2020	Drivethrucards	Yes
Rangers Strike Trading Card Game	2006	Bandai	No
RAVE Master! Trading Card Game	2001	Konami	No
Raw Deal	2000	Comic Images/WWE	No
Rawen TCG	2013	Rawen Group Hungary	No
ReCharge	2001	Marvel Enterprises, Inc.	No
Red Zone	1995	Donruss	No
Redakai: Conquer the Kairu	2011	Spin Master	No
Redemption	1995	Cactus Game Design	Yes
Riftbound	2025	Riot Games	Yes
RIFTS Collectible Card Game	2001	Precedence Entertainment/Palladium Books	No
Robotech Collectible Card Game	2006	Hero Factory	No
Round Table Trading Card Game	2024	Nimue Innovation Studios	Yes
Rugby Attax	2015	Topps	No
RuinsWorld	1995	Medallion Simulations	No
Ryvah Collectible Card Game	2006	Ryvah	No
Sailor Moon Collectible Card Game	2000	Dart Flipcards	No
Scooby Doo Expandable Card Game	2000	Journeyman Press	No
Shadowfist	1995	Daedalus Entertainment/Z-Man Games/Loch Ness Games, Inc./Inner Kingdom Games/Vetusta Games	Yes
Shadowrun: The Trading Card Game	1997	FASA/WizKids	No
Shadowverse: Evolve	2023	Bushiroad	Yes
Shaman King Trading Card Game	2004	Upper Deck	No
Shin Sangoku Musou 4 Trading Card Game	2005	Koei Co. Ltd.	No
Siegkrone TCG	2013?	Gree	Yes
Sim City: The Card Game	1995	Mayfair Games	No
The Simpsons Sammelkartenspiel	2001	Dino Entertainment/Panini	No
The Simpsons Trading Card Game	2003	Wizards of the Coast	No
Six Forms	2024	Play Bishop LLC	No
Sonic X Card Game	2005	Score Entertainment	No
Sorcery: Contested Realm	2023	Erik's Curiosa Ltd.	Yes
Spellfire	1994	TSR	No
The Spoils Card Game	2006	Arcane Tinmen	No
SpongeBob Squarepants Trading Card Game	2003	Upper Deck	No
Spycraft Collectible Card Game	2004	AEG	No
Star of the Guardians	1995	Mag Force 7	No
Star Quest	1995	Comic Images	No
Star Sisterz	2003	Wizards of the Coast	No
Star Trek: The Card Game	1996	Fleer/SkyBox International	No
Star Trek Customizable Card Game	1994	Decipher, Inc.	No
Star Trek Customizable Card Game Second Edition	2002	Decipher, Inc.	No
Star Wars Customizable Card Game	1995	Decipher, Inc.	No
Star Wars: Destiny	2016	Fantasy Flight Games	No
Star Wars Trading Card Game	2002	Wizards of the Coast	No
Star Wars: Unlimited	2024	Fantasy Flight Games	Yes
Stargate Trading Card Game	2007	Comic Images	No
Stoked! Skateboarding Must Die	2005	Sir Mantraplay	No
Street Proz	2004	Game On Sports, Inc.	No
Street Warriors Collectible Card Game	2005	Lethal Entertainment, Inc.	No
Super Deck!	1994	Card Sharks, Inc.	No
Super Heat Skateboard Trading Card Game	2011	Super Heat Games	No
Super Robot Taisen Scramble Gather	1996	Bandai	No
Superhero Front Scramble Duel	1999	Bandai	No
Superior Defender Gundam Collectible Card Game	2004	Bandai	No
The Supershow	2014	SRG Universe Inc.	Yes
Survivor	2002	Upper Deck	No
Takaharuga God TCG	1998	MediaWorks	No
Tank Commander	1996	Moments in History	No
Techniconica	2014	Stephen Bailey	No?
Teen Titans Collectible Card Game	2005	Bandai	No
Teenage Mutant Ninja Turtles Trading Card Game	2004	Upper Deck	No
Teenage Mutant Ninja Turtles Turtle Power	2013	Panini Games	No
Tempest of the Gods	1995	Black Dragon Press	No
The Terminator	2000	Precedence Entertainment/Tyranny Games/Zehrapushu/ZI Games	No
Terror	1996	Kris Silver	No
Thorgal Kolekcjonerska Gra Karciana	2002	Egmont Polksa	No
Timestream: The Remnant	2002	Cahaba Productions Inc.	No
Time Vault Soccer football card game	2018	Silo 10 Games	Yes
Tomb Raider Collectible Card Game	1999	Precedence Entertainment	No
Top of the Order	1995	Donruss	No
Towers in Time	1995	Thunder Castle Games	No
Transformers	2018	Wizards of the Coast	No
Trok	2019	Trok TCG	Yes
True Megami Reincarnation Trading Card	1997?	Enterbrain	No?
Ultimate Combat!	1995	Ultimate Games	No
Ultraman Card Game	2024	Tsuburaya Productions	Yes
Ultimate Muscle: The Kinnikuman Legacy Battle Card Game	2003	Bandai	No
Union Arena	2024	Bandai	Yes
Universal Fighting System (AKA UniVersus)	2006	Sabertooth Games/Fantasy Flight Games/Jasco Games/UVS Games	Yes
UniVersus (AKA Universal Fighting System)	2021	Sabertooth Games/Fantasy Flight Games/Jasco Games/UVS Games	Yes
Unlimited VS	2014	SK Japan	No
Vampire: The Eternal Struggle (AKA Jyhad)	1995	Wizards of the Coast/White Wolf Publishing, Inc./Black Chantry	Yes
Vandaria Arkana	2013?	Vandaria	No
Vandaria Wars Trading Card Game	2006	GameQuarters	No
Veto!	2003	Krakowska Grupa Kreatywna	No
Vortium	2014	Domo Sur SRL	Yes
Vrooom!	1998	Ikon Games	No
VS System	2004	Upper Deck	No
Wakfu Trading Card Game	2011	Ankama Games/Upper Deck	No
Warcards	2005	SC Patiart SRL	No
Warcardz	2008	Warmoves Inc.	No
WarCry	2003	Sabertooth Games	No
Ward	2023	Ward Trading Card Company LLC	Yes
Warhammer 40,000 Collectible Card Game	2001	Sabertooth Games	No
Warhammer Age of Sigmar: Champions	2018	PlayFusion Limited/Games Workshop	No
Warlord: Saga of the Storm	2001	AEG/Phoenix Interactive	No
Warlords	1997	Iron Crown Enterprises	No
WARS Trading Card Game	2004	Decipher, Inc.	No
Wars of the Past	2021	Finople Games/Finople Games	Yes
WCW Nitro	2000	Wizards of the Coast	No
Weekly Shonen Sunday VS Weekly Shonen Magazine	2008	Bushiroad	No
Weiß Schwarz	2007	Bushiroad	Yes
The Wheel of Time	1999	Precedence Entertainment	No
WildStorms: The Expandable Super-Hero Card Game	1995	WildStorm Productions	No
Wing Commander Collectible Trading Card Game	1995	Mag Force 7	No
Winx Club Collectible Card Game	2006	Rainbow Games/Upper Deck	No
Wixoss	2014	Tomy	Yes
Wizard in Training	2000	Upper Deck	No
Wizards of Mickey	2008	New Media Publishing	No
World of Warcraft Trading Card Game	2006	Upper Deck/Cryptozoic Entertainment	No
WWE Face Off	2007	Topps	No
Wyvern	1995	U.S. Games Systems	No
The X-Files Collectible Card Game	1996	Voyager Promotions	No
X-Men	2000	Wizards of the Coast	No
X610Z existenz	2009	Quantuum Magic	No
Xeko	2005	Matter Group	No
Xena: Warrior Princess	1998	Wizards of the Coast	No
Xiaolin Showdown Trading Card Game	2005	Wizards of the Coast	No
XXXenophile	1996	Slag-Blah Entertainment/Studio Foglio	No
Young Jedi Collectible Card Game	1999	Decipher, Inc.	No
Yu-Gi-Oh! Rush Duel	2020 (JP Only)	Konami	Yes
Yu-Gi-Oh! Trading Card Game	1999/2002	Konami	Yes
Yu Yu Hakusho Trading Card Game	2003	Score Entertainment	No
Zatch Bell! The Card Battle	2005	Bandai	No
ZU Tiles: Hime	2020	ZU Studios, LLC	Yes
Z-G	2001	Automoton	No
Z/X Zillions of enemy X	2013 (JP Only)	Broccoli / Nippon Ichi Software	Yes
Second Pandemic	2022	Unknown	No

== Collectible common-deck card games ==
These card games are very similar to regular CCGs; however, they do not meet the strict definition, because all players use a shared deck, also known as a common deck, similar to Uno. There is little to no interest in collecting the cards.

- Citadel Combat Cards (1992)
- Dino Hunt (Steve Jackson Games) (1996)
- Dragon Storm Game (Black Dragon Press) (1995)
- Nuclear War (Flying Buffalo) (1965)

== Non-collectible customizable card games ==
Sometimes referred to as Living Card Games or Expandable Card Games, these games are very similar to CCGs but lack randomness to the purchase and distribution of the cards. Most are sold as complete sets and are therefore not collectible. Some of these games were meant to be traditional CCGs with booster packs, but the booster packs were never released.

- AdventureQuest Worlds The Anything-Goes BattleOn Battle Card Game (Artix Entertainment)
- Anachronism (TriKing Games/The History Channel)
- Android: Netrunner (Fantasy Flight Games) (2012)
- Anime Madness (Matthew Johnston Games) (1996)
- Arcmage: Rebirth (Arcmage Creative Commons Games) (2018)
- Arkham Horror: The Card Game (Fantasy Flight Games) (2016)
- Ashes: Rise of the Phoenixborn (Plaid Hat Games) (2015)
- Call of Cthulhu: The Card Game (Fantasy Flight Games) (2008)
- Calorie Kids (Ocean of Wisdom) (2000)
- Catan Card Game (1996) and its successor The Rivals for Catan (2010) can be played as a customizable card game with the “tournament rules”
- ChessHeads (WizerGames) (2004)
- Codex: Card-Time Strategy (Sirlin Games) (2016)
- Doomtown: Reloaded (Alderac Entertainment Group/Pine Box Entertainment)
- Elemental Clash (The Game Crafter/T.O.G. Entertainment) (2009)
- A Game of Thrones: The Card Game (Fantasy Flight Games) (2008)
- A Game of Thrones: The Card Game Second Edition (Fantasy Flight Games) (2015)
- Heavy Gear Fighter (Dream Pod 9) (1995)
- Horsepower: 5000 (self-published) (1995)
- Killer Bunnies and the Ultimate Odyssey
- Knightmare Chess (Steve Jackson Games) (1996)
- The Last Great War (The Outsiders Group) (1997)
- Legend of the Five Rings: The Card Game (Fantasy Flight Games) (2017)
- The Lord of the Rings: The Card Game (Fantasy Flight Games) (2011)
- Ophidian 2350 (Ophidian Games/Fleer) (2016)
- Shadowfist (2012) (re-styled in 2012 as a "Dynamic Card Game", with pre-constructed starter decks and non-randomized booster packs)
- Star Wars: The Card Game (Fantasy Flight Games) (2012)
- Star Wars Episode 1 CCG Boxed Set (Decipher, Inc.) (1999)
- Tribbles (Decipher, Inc.) (2000)
- Vampire: The Masquerade - Rivals Expandable Card Game (2021)
- Warhammer 40,000: Conquest (Fantasy Flight Games) (2014)
- Warhammer: Invasion (Fantasy Flight Games) (2009)
- Xi Cards (Xi Cards Ltd.) (2014)
- You Got Schooled Card Game (2023)
- DUELIX : an argentinean Trading Card Game of free impression of the cards {[ https://www.youtube.com/@desaintshom ]}

== Notable non-collectible games ==
This is a catch-all category for those games that appear similar to CCGs but don't meet the strict definition in one way or another.

- Age of Heroes(Renegade Mage Games) (1997)
- The Base Ball Card Game (Allegheny) (1904)
- BattleCards (Merlin Publishing) (1993)
- Boy Crazy (Decipher, Inc.) (2000)
- Brawl (Cheapass Games) (1999)
- Chez Geek (Steve Jackson Games) (1999)
- Dark Mages (Bleem Divertissements Inc.) (2015)
- DragonElves (Fast Forward Entertainment) (2000)
- Emmerlaus: Duels of Mages (Creations Chaos) (1996)
- Express Chess (Black Box Entertainment) (1995)
- Fluxx (Looney Labs) (1996)
- Havic: The Bothering (PGI Limited) (1998)
- Illuminati (Steve Jackson Games) (1982)
- KeyForge (Fantasy Flight Games) (2018)
- Lost Worlds Fantasy Cards (1980)
- Mystick (Anoch Games Systems) (2000)
- Quest for the Faysylwood (Faysylwood Press) (1993)
- Rumble Robots (Trendmasters) (2000)
- Shadow Raven (Destiny Horizons, Inc.) (2000)
- Strat-O-Matic Baseball (1961)
- Zoon (West End Games) (1999)

== See also ==
- Collectible card game
- Digital collectible card game
- List of digital collectible card games
- List of collectible miniatures games
