= RuinsWorld =

Collectible card game

- Publishers: Medallion Simulations
- Players: 2 or more
- Setup time: < 5 minutes
- Playing time: < 60 minutes

RuinsWorld is an out-of-print collectible card game by Medallion Simulations released in December 1995. It had one base set consisting of 199 cards sold in 65-card starter decks and 15-card booster packs.

The game played similarly to Fantasy Adventures and was compared to Banemaster: The Adventure by players, with a key difference being that no one plays as "the bad guy." In RuinsWorld, players control a Character for adventuring and play with multiple decks. Players equip their characters with items from their Marketplace deck, encounter creatures from the Journey deck, and battle for treasure found in their play deck. There are many different uses for the cards, including playing solitaire against your own deck.
