= Ultimate Combat! =

Collectible card game

- Card back of Ultimate Combat! CCG
- Designers: Dave Long
- Publishers: Ultimate Games
- Players: 2
- Playing time: Approx 30 min
- Chance: Some
- Age range: 10+
- Skills: Card playing Arithmetic; Basic Reading Ability

Ultimate Combat! is an out-of-print collectible card game designed around the concept of Asian martial arts combat. The game was designed by judo sensei Dave Long and released in 1995 by Ultimate Games. It is very similar to Magic: The Gathering and roughly 75% of the rules are the same. It was endorsed by the United States Judo Association team, the USA Taekwondo team and the USA Wrestling team.

The base set covers the martial arts of judo, karate, jujitsu, taekwondo, boxing and wrestling. The first and only expansion to the base set was The Ancient Fighting Arts of China. This covers the Chinese martial arts of kung fu and tai chi. It was researched with the assistance of Dr. Chi-Hsiu Wing of Beijing University and Professor Yoshihiro Uchida of San Jose State University.

== Gameplay summary ==
Players in Ultimate Combat! compete to knock their opponent unconscious using cards representing various martial arts moves and techniques. Players alternate turns with each turn consisting of the following phases:

- Recovery Phase where cards which were drained of power in previous turns are recovered.
- Draw Phase where cards are drawn from the draw deck to increase the hand size back up to ten cards.
- Build Phase where the player can increase his or her total capacity for action by deploying a single foundation card.
- Activity Phase where the core actions of the game take place, including the use of an offensive technique.
- Discard Phase where one must discard if more than ten cards are currently held.

Players build up a base of power by deploying foundation cards over successive turns (akin to land cards in Magic: The Gathering), and then use those foundations to bring other cards into play. The most important of these other cards are the technique cards, which can be used to launch or block an attack. Each turn, during the activity phase, the acting player may launch an attack using a single technique which has previously been brought into play, and the other player can respond by blocking with a technique or his or her own. Any and all techniques used in an attack are discarded afterwards, so players must weigh whether to expend a technique on defense, as it will then not be available for offense. Various modifiers are applied to attack values based on whether the combatants are moving, and as a result of any advantage cards played during the attack, with the final resolution possibly including the defender taking damage.

== History ==
Ultimate Combat! began its existence as a board game created by Dave Long in 1987 for play by members of the US Judo International Traveling team - judo players who were at the 'top of the heap' in US Judo and odds-on favorites to make the 1988 Olympic Team. The board game, which is unnamed, included about 20 different playable characters, each with different levels of physical strength, speed, stamina, and a variety of techniques. Attacks could be enhanced with the addition of strength and speed points, and were more effective when moving in each technique's favorite direction.

That game languished in obscurity until 1994 when Long was introduced to Magic: the Gathering, a brand new collectible card game (CCG). He was impressed by the M:tG gaming system and felt that it would fit very well with his six-year-old judo board game and after 6 months of working with fledgling game designers, rules "lawyers", and a lot of playtesters, Ultimate Combat! was ready to go into production. At that point, Long raised a quarter of a million dollars from 22 investors in less than 24 hours, traveled to a number of card manufacturers looking at production and card mixing systems, and ended up signing a deal with Upper Deck of San Diego, who put Ultimate Combat! on the shelves of card stores in the spring of 1995.

Scrye magazine named Ultimate Combat! as the best new CCG of 1995, but unfortunately for UC! fans, it was introduced alongside 58 other new CCGs in 1995. This resulted in difficulties achieving a sustainable income producing fan base. After the single Ancient Fighting Arts of China expansion (also published in 1995), Ultimate Games, makers of Ultimate Combat! closed its doors.

For those who have said that the UC! play system, with its use of Foundation cards replacing Magic's Land cards, and the Draining of Foundation Cards replacing the Tapping of Magic's Land Cards was essentially a "knockoff" of Magic: The Gathering, Long responds, "Yep, it sure was. But it was fun and a lot of folks enjoyed playing it."

According to Allen Varney of The Duelist, the game was considered a "worse clone" of Magic: the Gathering.

== Card types ==
- Foundations - Cards which represent physical conditioning and training. These cards are "drained" to pay the cost for playing other cards. There are four different types of foundations: Conditioning, Experience, Fighting Spirit, and Knowledge.
- Techniques - Cards which symbolize different types of kicks, throws, and strikes. Technique cards feature both an attack and a defense value.
- Weapons - Relatively rare cards which depict a weapon of some type. Weapons confer a bonus on both offense and defense, and are reusable, but limit the type and number of other techniques which can be used. They can also break through use, requiring the player to win a game of rock paper scissors in order to continue to use it after each attack involving the weapon.
- Talismans - A mystical or lucky item which provides a minor bonus. Each player may have only one of a given type of talisman in play at a time.
- Armor - Cards which represent some form of protection or armor worn on the body, providing protection. As with talismans, each player may have only one of a given type of armor in play at a time.
- Advantages - Cards which are played on a technique during an attack in order to modify it. They apply only to that attack and are discarded after use.
- Actions - Cards which cause some immediate effect, such as forcing an opponent to discard or inflicting direct harm. They are played during the activity phase, but cannot be played during an actual attack.
- Movement - Represent the fighter moving in a given direction (e.g. forwards towards the opponent or away from the opponent). The direction of movement (of both the attacker and defender) influences the effectiveness of various attacks.
- Environments - Cards which change the nature of the fighting environment to something non-standard (e.g. in darkness or heavy rain). Only one can be in effect at once, and they automatically leave play after three turns.

== Card distribution ==
Cards in Ultimate Combat! are divided up into one of four levels of rarity, although the game refers to these as different levels of martial arts mastery, ranking them by "belt". Traditionally in the martial arts, a black belt is the highest rank, but Ultimate Combat! instead defines the gold belt as the maximum level. The relative rarity distribution in starter packs and booster packs is as follows:

Ultimate Combat! card distribution
| Belt ranking | Rarity | Cards in starter | Cards in booster |
|---|---|---|---|
| Gold Belt | Very rare | 2 | 1 |
| Black Belt | Rare | 4 | 2 |
| Brown Belt | Uncommon | 10 | 3 |
| White Belt | Common | 44 | 9 |

In addition to the base card set, Ultimate Combat! features a single expansion card set, the Ancient Fighting Arts of China. The number of unique cards in each set breaks down by rarity as follows:

Card count and rarity by set
| Card set | Gold Belt | Black Belt | Brown Belt | White Belt | Total cards |
|---|---|---|---|---|---|
| Ultimate Combat! base set | 72 | 72 | 60 | 62 | 266 |
| Ancient Fighting Arts of China | 45 | 30 | 27 | 36 | 138 |

== Deck construction ==
Each player in Ultimate Combat! must have his or her own play deck. Each deck must have a minimum of 50 cards, although there is no maximum limit. No more than four of any given card are allowed in a deck, with the exception of basic foundation and basic movement cards (for which there is no limit). Any card which is marked with a "skull & crossbones" symbol is considered restricted and is limited to one of each such card per deck.

In an effort to keep gameplay competitive between a player who owns few cards and a player who owns a large number of rare cards, Ultimate Combat! defines the concept of a deck classification system. This classification system limits the number of rare cards in lower-ranked decks, as cards generally increase in strength as they increase in rarity. The system again uses the martial arts "belt" system for its nomenclature, with the gold "Master's Deck" having no rarity restrictions. The deck ranks are defined as follows:

| Card type | White Belt deck | Brown Belt deck | Black Belt deck | Master's deck |
|---|---|---|---|---|
| Gold Belt | 2 | 4 | 8 | unlimited |
| Black Belt | 4 | 8 | 16 | unlimited |
| Brown Belt | 10 | 20 | unlimited | unlimited |
| White Belt | unlimited | unlimited | unlimited | unlimited |
