= Flights of Fantasy =

Collectible card game

- Front and back of a Flights of Fantasy card: Vial of Blood promo card.
- Publishers: Destini Productions
- Players: 2 or more
- Setup time: < 5 minutes
- Playing time: < 60 minutes

Flights of Fantasy is a collectible card game. It was published by Destini Productions and was released in 1994.

== Publication history ==
Flights of Fantasy is an out-of-print fantasy trading card art set that was turned into a collectible card game near the end of its development and marketed as a "Collectors Card Set & Game". The game is technically the second CCG ever released, however it's not considered a serious contender. It was published by Destini Productions and was released in September 1994.

== Description ==
The set had 118 cards and was sold only in booster packs. The game is generally not considered the second CCG released after Magic: the Gathering because of its gimmicky nature. The game mechanics appear to be "grafted on" and merely an afterthought, and it lacks a uniform card back. All card back art was created by Ed Beard Jr. According to Beard, as a "first collector card/game" it began production in May 1992.

The card art was designed specifically to match a storyline, featuring "novel-like" card backs. The game claimed to feature "quick and fierce" battles based on the story, and could be played a variety of ways. According to Scrye magazine from 1995, the game was to be released mid-December of 1995 in boxes consisting of 36 booster packs with 10 cards.

== Reception ==
Scrye noted that the gameplay element was a "very minor" part to what was essentially a "card art set" and appeared to be "grafted on" and was about to fun to play as "doing your taxes".
