= Star Quest (disambiguation) =

Star Quest is a 1968 novel by Dean R. Koontz.

Star Quest, Starquest, or StarQuest may also refer to:

== Films ==
- Terminal Voyage, a 1994 science fiction film sometimes released under the tile "Star Quest"
- Starquest II, a 1997 science fiction thriller film by Fred Gallo
- Star Quest: The Odyssey, a 2009 American science fiction film

== Books ==
- Star Quest: An Incredible Journey into the Unknown, a book in Stewart Cowley's Terran Trade Authority / Galactic Encounters series

== Tabletop games ==
- Star Quest (board game)
- Star Quest (card game)

== Videogames ==
- Star Quest 1 in the 27th century, a 1995 video game
- StarQuest Online, a 2007 video game
- Star Cruiser, a 1988 Japanese video game, the North American release of which was planned to be called Star Quest but was cancelled
