= Flesh and Blood (card game) =

Trading card game by Legend Story Studios

- Designer: James White
- Publisher: Legend Story Studios
- Release date: 11 October 2019
- Type: Collectible card game
- Players: 2 or more
- Age range: 16+
- Playing time: < 50 minutes
- Chance: Low
- Website: fabtcg.com

Flesh and Blood is a trading card game published by Legend Story Studios (LSS), an independent design studio based in Auckland, New Zealand. Gameplay focuses on two players who each control a single hero who battle one versus one to the death. It was designed by James White, who had previously played Magic: The Gathering professionally. The game is based on elements of fantasy and, to some extent, science fiction. The name of the game is meant to imply that the game was designed to be played in person instead of as an online game.

== Organized play ==
James White and Legend Story Studios based their game design on an organized play framework supporting play across four competitive tiers with a diversity of prize pools. The Flesh and Blood World Tour draws players from all over the globe to compete for cash prizes and prestige. The prize pool for the 2026 World Tour is US$2,000,000.

Learn to Play events, which are Tier 0, and Armory Events, which are Tier 1, are usually weekly events organized by local game stores. They are run at a Casual rules enforcement level (REL). Skirmish Seasons, also in Tier 1, are held throughout the year, with competitive play but run at a Casual REL. Tier 2 events are Competitive REL tournaments. These include Showdowns, Road to Nationals and Pro Quest/Pro Quest+ tournaments. National Championships are invitation-only Tier 3 tournaments run by LSS yearly in official Flesh and Blood territories while Callings are a series of open-entry Tier 3 tournaments. The Tier 4 events, Pro Tours and the World Championship, are held over a weekend, with the World Championship being the highest level. All Tier 3 and Tier 4 events (except day one of a Calling) are run with Professional REL.

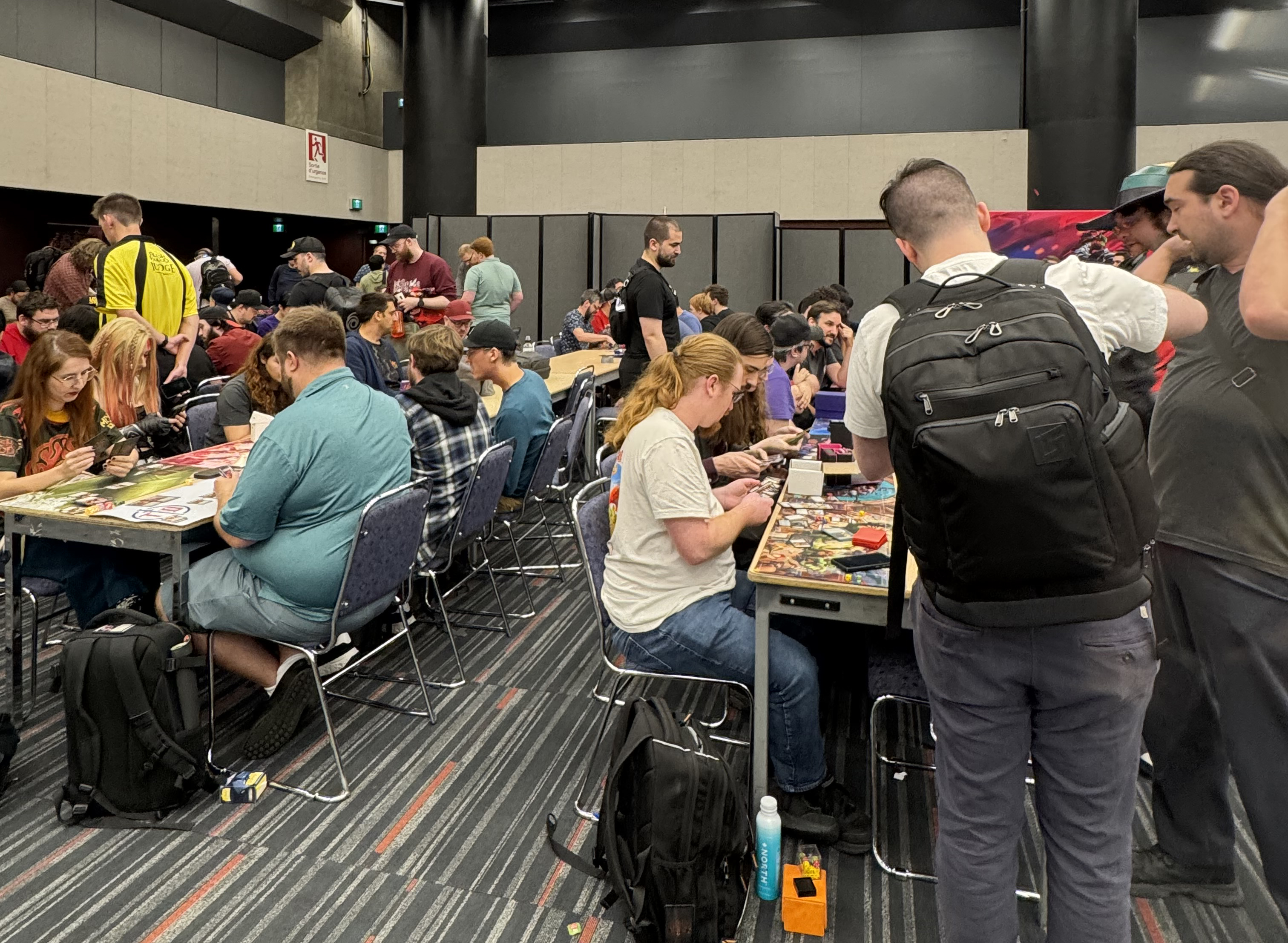
Flesh and Blood Super Slam World Premiere at the Palais des Congrès de Montréal on 14 September 2025.

Booster sets tend to have a World Premiere event (with organized play events present). These World Premiere events allow the Flesh and Blood community to discover which cards the new set has, explore a new competitive environment together, compete in community events (such as cosplay) and see friends from around the world.

In 2021, Flesh and Blood was officially sold in local game stores in more than 30 countries, with decks manufactured in Belgium, Japan and the United States. In 2023, the number of countries had risen to 42. In 2025 there were National Championships in 47 countries. James White and LSS made an open commitment to the game's players to keep events international and diverse, allowing players to find events near them when possible.

== Gameplay ==
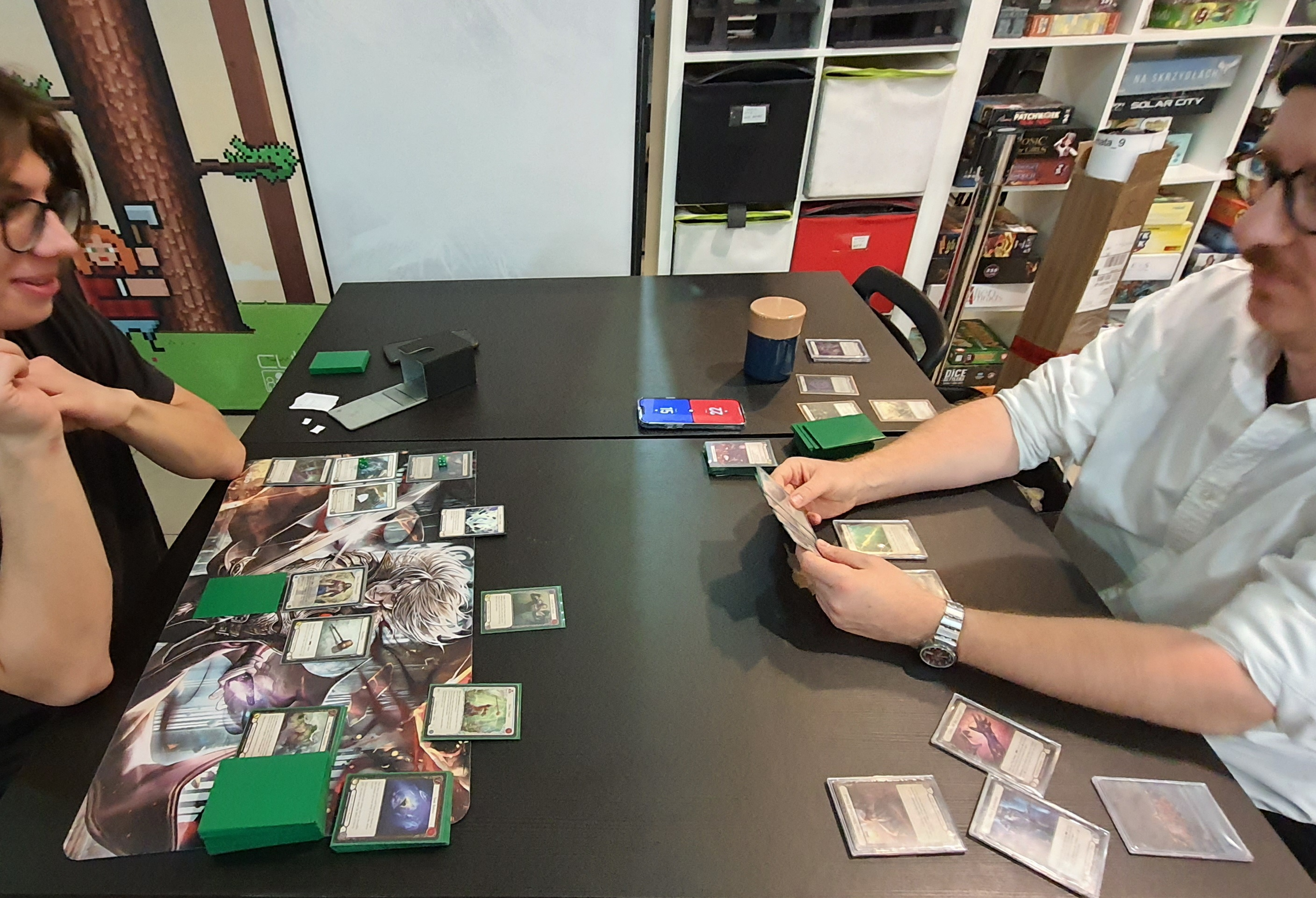
People playing Flesh and Blood

The game involves two or more players who assume the control of a hero, a character with equipment, abilities and set of cards. There are thirteen different card types, such as hero, equipment, weapon, action, reaction (attack and defense), instant or block. Hero, weapon and equipment cards are in play at the start of the game. Most cards are discarded into a "graveyard" after play. Each hero has intellect and life points, and is in one of fourteen classes. The most common are: Assassin, Brute, Guardian, Illusionist, Mechanologist, Ninja, Ranger, Runeblade, Warrior, or Wizard. Players draw cards equal to the hero's intellect. If a hero's life points reaches zero, the player controlling the hero loses the game.

Players build a deck of 60 to 80 cards, with no more than three copies of cards having the same name in one deck. The two constructed game formats, Blitz and Classic Constructed, have a different version of each Hero card. The young version of each card is used in the Blitz format, which has a faster pace of play.

== Tournaments ==
In October 2019, Legend Story Studios established an organised play programme dubbed "The Calling" for competitive sealed-deck play, with a prize pool of $10,000 per tournament. Temporarily suspended as a result of the COVID-19 pandemic, the programme resumed in 2021. By November 2023, over 2000 game stores worldwide hosted such events. In October 2023, the company established Social Play game store events for casual players.

In November 2022, the company organised the first Flesh and Blood World Championships in San Jose, California, with a prize pool of $300,000.

In 2024, the company organized a "Pro Play 2024" circuit, with a prize pool of $1,500,000.

A Hero that wins a tournament accrues "Living Legend" points, which, upon reaching a certain amount, results in that hero's card being retired from official tournament play.

== Sets ==
Each Flesh and Blood set used to be published in two editions. The initial set release was the collector-focused First Edition published using cold foil printing in a limited print run. This was followed by the Unlimited Edition, which was published based on market demand. This technique is common in the early stages of many trading card games as it allows collectors to secure value in First Edition cards while players still have accesses to affordable versions of important cards.

After the "FAB 2.0" update LSS did away with the 1st/Unlimited model and replaced it with a single box model.

#	Set	Set code	Release date	Size								Ref.
#	Set	Set code	Release date	Total Cards	Token/Basic	Common	Rare	Super Rare	Majestic	Legendary	Fabled	Ref.
1	Welcome to Rathe	WTR	11 October 2019	226	15	132	48	15	10	5	1	
2	Arcane Rising	ARC	27 March 2020	219	14	126	48	15	10	5	1	
3	Crucible of War	CRU	28 August 2020	198	0	103	56	0	36	2	1	
4	Monarch	MON	7 May 2021	307	18	172	79	0	31	6	1	
5	Tales of Aria	ELE	24 September 2021	238	14	136	54	0	27	6	1	
6	Everfest	EVR	4 February 2022	198	0	88	61	0	45	3	1	
N/A	History Pack 1	1HP	6 May 2022	427	0	238	118	0	62	9	0	
7	Uprising	UPR	24 June 2022	226	16	125	51	0	27	6	1	
8	Dynasty	DYN	11 November 2022	247	0	109	81	0	51	5	1	
N/A	History Pack 2	2HP	24 February 2023	536	0	301	140	0	78	14	3	
9	Outsiders	OUT	24 March 2023	236	20	128	51	0	31	5	1	
10	Dusk till Dawn	DTD	14 July 2023	236	0	94	77	0	56	8	1	
11	Bright Lights	EVO	6 October 2023	251	12	129	56	0	46	7	1	
12	Heavy Hitters	HVY	2 February 2024	256	15	128	67	0	40	5	1	
13	Part the Mistveil	MST	31 May 2024	239	12	123	54	0	43	6	1	
14	Rosetta	ROS	20 September 2024	254	14	128	57	0	49	5	1	
15	The Hunted	HNT	31 January 2025	265	16	130	66	0	42	6	1	
16	High Seas	SEA	6 June 2025	265	18	127	64	0	46	6	1	
N/A	Mastery Pack Guardian	MPG	8 August 2025	130	3	76	30	0	16	3	0	
17	Super Slam	SUP	26 September 2025	276	14	134	40	40	42	5	1	
18	Compendium of Rathe	PEN	13 February 2026	348	0	142	124	0	59	8	0	
19	Omens of the Third Age	OMN	5 June 2026	251	14	134	60	0	37	5	1	
N/A	Mastery Pack Warrior	MPW	7 August 2026	156	10	80	40	0	20	4	0	
20	Usurp the Shadow Throne	IAR	25 September 2026	263	16	133	66	0	40	5	2	
N/A	Mastery Pack Assassin	MPA	13 November 2026	157	8	82	40	0	20	3	0	
21	Outbreak	OBK	12 February 2027	274	18	141	69	0	40	5	0	

== Reception ==
Drew Cordell of SUPERJUMP magazine wrote favorably of the game. Andrew Smith from the website Board Game Quest compared it to Magic: The Gathering, but noted that Flesh and Blood was easier to learn.

In 2021, ICv2 rated it as a "top collectible game". In 2022, Legend Story Studio was awarded the first place on the Deloitte Fast 50. In November 2023, Legend Story Studios won the Excellence in Brand Storytelling Award at the New Zealand International Business Awards for their work on Flesh and Blood.

== See also ==
- List of collectible card games
