= Providence: Main World Book =

Providence: Main World Book is a 1997 role-playing game supplement published by XID Creative for Providence.

== Contents ==
Providence: Main World Book is a supplement that details the world of Providence.

== Reviews ==
- InQuest Gamer #36
- Backstab #10
