= Marvel Super Dice =

Board Game

Marvel Super Dice is a board game published by TSR in 1997.

== Gameplay ==
Marvel Super Dice is a collectible superhero dice game.

== Reviews ==
- InQuest Gamer #36
- Backstab #10
