= Havic: The Bothering =

Collectible trading card game

- Havic: The Bothering's card back design
- Designers: Peter Gray and Frank Martell
- Publishers: PGI Limited
- Players: 2 or more
- Setup time: < 2 minutes
- Playing time: ~ 25 minutes or longer.
- Chance: Some
- Skills: Card playing Arithmetic; Reading; Logic; Strategy

Havic: The Bothering (colloquially "Havic" or "HTB") is a parody of the collectible card game Magic: The Gathering. Havic was created by Peter Gray and Frank Martell and introduced in 1998 by PGI Limited.

== History ==
Only the first card set of Havic named Skool Daze was printed and distributed in randomly inserted 60 card shrink-wrapped starter decks which also included 1 rule card. A second set called Spring Break was in the works and would have been sold in booster packs, but was never released to the public.

Wizards of the Coast, which owned the rights to Magic: The Gathering, took active steps to hinder the distribution of the game and successfully shut out PGI Limited from attending GenCon in July 1998. Havic: The Bothering was a highly questionable product from a legal point of view because of its many similarities to Magic. In an unsuccessful attempt to circumvent copyright issues and the infringement of Richard Garfield’s patented trading card game foundations, two steps were taken. First of all each starter deck of Havic had printed on the back side, “This is a Parody.” The second step taken was to include on the bottom of the rule card, “*DO NOT HAVE EACH PLAYER: construct their own library of predetermined number of game components by examining and selecting [the] game components from [a] reservoir of game components or you may infringe on U.S. Patent No.5,662,332 to Garfield.”

A promotional card named Vegan was not included in the Skool Daze starter decks. It was instead to be inserted with InQuest Gamer Magazine as a free card for readers. Its distribution was rejected by InQuest due to the questionable legal status of the game and the card was never printed.

== Game play ==
Unlike the setting of Magic: The Gathering, where players are powerful planeswalkers battling to control a plane of existence, players of Havic are in the real world. The players of Havic are trying to take control of their local college campus. A player starts the game with twenty-one “points of sanity” and loses when they are reduced to zero or less. The most common method of reducing an opponent’s sanity is to attack with recruited peons.

Players begin the game with eight cards in hand from a deck that must contain exactly sixty cards. Players then roll a die and the person that rolled the highest takes the first turn. Each turn players draw one card and can play one property card. The four basic card types are Peons, effects, articles, and property cards. Unlike Magic which has five types of land cards to produce mana to cast spells, Havic only has two resources. These resources are beer and cigarettes which can be produced by the two different property cards which are Brewery and Convenience Store.

=== Deck construction ===
Each player needs a deck of exactly 60 cards to play a game of Havic. Players are warned against constructing their own deck out of a pool of cards on the Starter Deck rule card so that they do not infringe on Richard Garfield's US patent. Since players are not allowed to construct decks, they have to play with the randomly distributed 60-card starter decks. If the Spring Break expansion set had been released in booster packs it would have violated the warning on the rule card by encouraging players to buy cards in a quantity of fewer than 60 cards at a time.

== See also ==
- Unglued, an official parody expansion set for Magic: The Gathering released around the same time.
