= Red Zone (card game) =

Collectible card game

- Publishers: Donruss/NXT Games
- Players: 2 or more
- Setup time: < 5 minutes
- Playing time: < 60 minutes

Red Zone is an out-of-print collectible card game by Donruss and NXT Games. It was first released in October 1995. The game's base set consists of 336 cards sold in 80-card starter decks and 12-card booster packs. An expansion called 1995 Expansion Teams was released in December 1995 and contained 98 cards and focused on the Carolina Panthers and the Jacksonville Jaguars. In early 1996, Donruss sold its sports card and card-game properties to Pinnacle. NXT Games also had to renegotiate their licenses for Red Zone and Top of the Order with the NFL and MLB, but new iterations of the game never materialized.

Gameplay involved a player draft (not to be confused with the drafting format of CCGs) and chose one of eight offensive or defensive plays. Each player would then draw a card and the color denoted on that card would determine the final result of the play. The game was criticized for being "tedious and repetitive, and the actual players you used only rarely made a difference." Once you had players with high ratings there was no reason to use players with lower ratings, except in your play deck.
