= Super Deck! =

Collectible card game

- Card back of the Super Deck! CCG
- Publishers: Card Sharks
- Players: 2
- Playing time: Approx 20 min
- Chance: Some
- Age range: 8+
- Skills: Card playing Arithmetic; Basic Reading Ability

Super Deck! is an out-of-print super hero collectible card game designed by Marc Miller and produced by Card Sharks in 1994.

== Publication history ==
It was the fourth CCG ever made, preceded by Magic: the Gathering, Spellfire, and Jyhad. Gameplay involved two players, each playing on one side of hero vs. villain. Artwork was colored pencil/inkwork, and the characters were not properties of any major comic book company. Some of the artists included Brian Michael Bendis, Dean Haspiel, Phil Hester, Frances Mao, and Josh Neufeld.

It had one expansion called Slim Decks that was released in June 1995. This expansion had 160 cards sold in packs of 30. Ten percent of packs had one of two bonus cards, each redeemable for one of four more powerful cards that could not be obtained any other way.

== Description ==
The original set was 160 cards in size, sold in starter decks with 60 cards and a rulebook, and in 10-card booster packs.

In a product release article in InQuest, the game was described as suitable for those who "need an easy introduction to card games".

== Reception ==
Rich Warren reviewed Super Deck! in White Wolf Inphobia #53 (March, 1995), rating it a 1.5 out of 5 and stated that "There are only 160 cards in the Super Deck! series, so each pack includes several repeats. I doubt these cards will ever become valuable."
