= Star Trek: The Card Game =

Collectible card game

- Card back to the Star Trek: The Card Game
- Designers: Jeff Grubb, Don Perrin, Margaret Weis, Mag Force 7
- Publishers: Fleer/Skybox
- Players: 2 or more
- Setup time: < 5 minutes
- Playing time: < 60 minutes

Star Trek: The Card Game is an out-of-print collectible card game by Fleer and Skybox based on the original Star Trek series. The game was designed by Mag Force 7. The original set had 306 cards and was first released in June 1996.

One expansion was released in January 1997 called Starfleet Maneuvers. The 160-card set was designed by Ron Perazza and Steve Domzalski. This focused on the events of the first half of the second season of the show. Promotional cards were distributed in various magazines, including Combo and InQuest, and a Pavel Chekov promotional card was distributed at Gen Con '96.

A second expansion called Alien Encounters was planned for a summer 1997 release but never materialized. It would have focused on the events of the second half of the second season of the show and introduced the new card type Ally. An unnamed third expansion was planned for November 1997.

The game was not compatible with Decipher's iterations of the Star Trek Customizable Card Game.

The gameplay involved acting out an episode using the crew of the U.S.S. Enterprise.

== Reception ==
Andy Butcher reviewed Star Trek: The Card Game for Arcane magazine, rating it a 7 out of 10 overall, and stated that "this is a fun game that works well. It may not have quite enough depth to maintain your interest for extended play, but it's a great way to pass an hour or two when you don't feel up to anything too competitive, and as such you'll probably find yourself coming back to it again and again."

In a review published in the December 1996 issue of The Duelist, Allen Varney states that the game has a "retro, 1960s look" whose style "does not fit a series set in the 23rd century". He also stated that the rulebook is extensive but the game "works better when someone teaches you the rules".
