= Ani-Mayhem =

Anime-themed trading card game

Trading Card Game
- Ani-Mayhem card back
- Manufacturers: Geneon
- Designers: Jon Healy, Keith Pinster, and Josh Ritter
- Publishers: Upper Deck Company
- Publication: 1996; 30 years ago
- Players: 1-4
- Playing time: 45'
- Age range: 12 and up (OCG), 6 and up (TCG)
- Skills: Card playing Arithmetic; Basic reading ability

Ani-Mayhem is an out-of-print anime-based collectible card game first released in 1996 in the wake of the CCG boom created by the popularity of Magic: The Gathering. Produced by the merchandising arm of Pioneer Animation (now known as Geneon) and published by Upper Deck Company, Ani-Mayhem's cards featured images from a variety of anime series and movies. The first two sets were composed of multiple productions and the third and final set, published in 1997, was based entirely on the long-running Dragon Ball Z.

== History ==
John Healy, Josh Ritter, and Keith Pinster created Ani-Mayhem.

Ani-Mayhem was created in the post-Magic boom. When the first set, commonly known as Set 0, was published, its rulebook was considered uninformative and incomplete. Later printings of the game attempted to fix this by including a more detailed rulebook that fundamentally altered the way the game played. The Dragon Ball Z expansion, which came in starter decks just as the original set did, included a rule set that rewrote the game for a second time. That set was released in 1997 and it was the last set in the game.

The idea of the game was to allow an open-ended system that would allow all characters from all anime to interact with one another in the same card game. The result was a game that did not manage its terminology well. If you were to print out all the card errata, it would be at least three-to-four times as long as the game's rulebook. Another problem that hurt the game came in the wake of the Dragon Ball Z expansion. The cards in this set were typically much more powerful than the average cards present in Sets 0 and 1, leading to serious imbalance that was further compounded by the vast number of rules changes that the expansion introduced. Critics say the Ani-Mayhem card stock is relatively high quality.

Upper Deck Company tried this multi-property approach again five years later, creating the VS System, which proved to be more successful. Other multi-property games include Sabertooth Games' Universal Fighting System and Score Entertainment's Epic Battles. Decipher, Inc. similarly reused the game engine from the Star Wars CCG in its WARS Trading Card Game.

== Card Sets ==
- Set 0: Bubblegum Crisis, El-Hazard, Ranma ½, Tenchi Muyo!
- Set 1: Armitage III, Dominion: Tank Police, Oh My Goddess!, Phantom Quest Corp., Project A-ko
- Set 2: Dragon Ball Z

== Reception ==
Reviews:

- Świat Gier Komputerowych #64 (Polish)

== See also ==
- Dragon Ball Z Collectible Card Game
- Lycée Trading Card Game
- BESM A similar Game concept, but for RPGs instead.
- Weiß Schwarz Another multi-property anime-based card game
