= Ophidian =

Ophidian may refer to:

- Ophidian, a reptile of the suborder Ophidia (or Serpentes); a snake; snake-like
- Ophidian (wrestler), a professional wrestler
- Ophidian (Dungeons & Dragons), a Dungeons & Dragons monster
- Ophidian 2350, a collectible card game
- Ophidian, a fictional hotel from the American TV show Supernatural
- Ophidian, a DC Comics character in stories featuring the Orange Lantern Corps
