= Providence: Main Rule Book =

Providence: Main Rule Book is a 1997 role-playing game supplement published by XID Creative for Providence.

== Contents ==
Providence: Main Rule Book is a supplement presenting a role-playing character creation system.

== Reviews ==
- InQuest Gamer #36
- Backstab #10
