= Starship Troopers: Prepare for Battle! =

1997 board game by Avalon Hill

Starship Troopers: Prepare for Battle! is a board game published by Avalon Hill in 1997.

== Gameplay ==
Starship Troopers: Prepare for Battle! is a science fiction wargame.

== Reviews ==
- InQuest #34
- Backstab #7
- Games #145 (Vol 22, #3), 1998 June
