= Towers in Time =

Collectible card game

- Card back to Towers in Time CCG
- Publishers: Thunder Castle Games
- Players: 2 or more
- Setup time: < 5 minutes
- Playing time: < 60 minutes

Towers in Time is an out-of-print collectible card game by Thunder Castle Games that was released in April 1995. The base set had 150 cards with 56-card starter decks and 8-card booster packs. In 1996, the game was repackaged as a dedicated deck card game to be sold in a box set of 150 cards. Thunder Castle Games announced at least four expansions for the game but none of them ever materialized: Greek, Zodiac, Amazon, and Norse.

The game was chastised for having starter decks that contained no rules, and instead players would have to call a non-toll-free number to obtain the rules. The rules were eventually printed in Scrye magazine issue #3. An "icon explanation" card, however, was included in the starter decks, but the limited-edition version of the icon card did not explain all the icons found on the cards due to a printing error.

Gameplay depicted the two players as wizards battling between dimensions. Players won by destroying his opponent's Five Shields with creatures of specific status. There were 6 schools of magic broken down into 4 Elements: Fire, Water, Air, and Earth and 2 Colors: White and Black.
