= FOW =

FOW, FoW, or Fow may refer to:

- Forge welding
- Future of Wrestling, an American wrestling promotion
- John Robert Fow (1869–1943), New Zealand politician

== Gaming ==
- Flames of War, a miniatures wargame

== See also ==
- Faces of War, a video game
- Force of Will, a trading card game
- Fog of war, the concept of uncertainty in warfare
