= Dark Age (card game) =

Collectible card game

- Card back of the Dark Age card game
- Designers: Dave Gentzler, Luke Peterschmidt
- Publishers: Friedlander Publishing Group
- Players: 2 or more
- Setup time: < 5 minutes
- Playing time: < 60 minutes

Dark Age is an out-of-print collectible card game by Friedlander Publishing Group (FPG), originally released in July 1996. The game shared themes with the Mad Max franchise and featured work from artists such as Gerald Brom and Tim Bradstreet.

FPG intended for Dark Age to be released as three compatible stand-alone games. The first stand-alone set, titled Feudal Lords, contained 231 cards and was sold in 65-card starter decks and 10-card booster packs. Two promo cards were also available. The second stand-alone set, called The Brood, was planned to be released in October 1996 with 225 cards, but never entered production. The Brood had artists returning from Feudal Lords, and was focused on growth numbers used to increase a Brooder's size (a Brooder was a genetically engineered creature run amok).

A third expansion was scheduled for a 1997 release but also never made it to production.

== Reception ==
In a review published in the December 1996 issue of The Duelist, Allen Varney states that the Feudal Lords expansion set "relies on amazing artwork", albeit that "every woman is...a lightly clad supermodel" He also states that the rulebook is "attractive and well-written".

== Reviews ==
- Backstab (Issue 1 - Jan/Feb 1997)
