= Monster Magic =

Collectible card game

- Publishers: Trio Toys
- Players: 2 or more
- Setup time: < 5 minutes
- Playing time: < 60 minutes

Monster Magic is an out-of-print collectible card game by Trio Toys. It was released in 1995. The first and only set was called Alpha Series and had 104 cards. The packaging for the game suggested that four more expansions may have been released, which would bring the total to 520 cards — however it is unlikely that they were ever released.

The game was reviewed by Scrye and gameplay was described as little more than a set of playing cards. Each card had a horror motif, with glossy cards using rock star puns for the card names, such as "Axel Rhodes" that depicted a skeleton with a microphone.
