= Allegiance: War of Factions =

2004 collectible card game

- Designers: Andrew Grierson
- Publishers: Lucid Raven Productions
- Players: 2–6
- Playing time: Approximately 1 hour
- Chance: Some
- Skills: Card playing Arithmetic; Basic Reading Ability

Allegiance: War of Factions is an out-of-print social and political collectible card game set in a medieval city-state undergoing political turmoil due to the death of its king. It was created by Andrew Grierson and published by Lucid Raven Productions in 2004.

== Game summary ==
Two or more players attempt to gain the support of influential individuals within the city in order to assume the throne. Players can alternatively mount armies and eliminate opponents militarily. Defenses are also necessary due to a card type called Wanderers, randomly controlled elements (usually in the guise of monsters) that occasionally attack players. If at any point during the game the wanderers equal more than three times the number of players, all players immediately lose the game. In order to win the game through influence, a player must start a round with Victory Influence equal to or greater than an agreed amount - normally 25.

== Play sequence ==
Allegiance uses rounds instead of turns, meaning that all players perform the same phase before moving on to the next. A full round consist of five phases:

1. City Maintenance Phase – Immediately upon beginning this phase, a check for victory is performed to see if any players have reached the target amount of Victory Influence. Next, the player with the most influence tokens is declared the Lead Player for that round. Finally, players draw until they hold seven cards in their hand, ready all cards and can move cards around between certain areas of the game.
2. Action and Development Phase – Beginning with the Lead Player, players take turns performing a single action. Actions include playing one card from the player's hand, or using one ability of one card in play. When all players have passed consecutively, the phase ends.
3. Military Phase – Beginning with the Lead Player, each player may declare one military attack, either against another player or against any or all Wanderers in one player's play area.
4. Wanderer Phase – Beginning with the Lead Player, an Aggression Check must be made for all wanderers. This is done by rolling a die for each and comparing it to the Agronssion printed on the card, with a die roll that is equal to or higher causing the wanderer to attack a random player. Once this is done, a new wanderer is brought into play by the active player. The next player clockwise then performs this phase, and the phase ends when all players have done so.
5. Discard Phase – Players may optionally discard up to three cards of their choice.

== Card types ==
- Personalities – Personalities are troops and citizens that ultimately lead a player to victory. They can be unique, named personalities (e.g. Feronant Domar) or generic unnamed personalities (e.g. Footman). There can only be one instance of any unique personality in play at any given time; this limitation does not affect generic personalities.
- Events – One-time events which have an immediate effect on the game.
- Items – Items such as swords, shields, and potions that can be given to any personality that a player controls.
- Invocations – Divine miracles that take the place of magic, invocations give a religious-based personality additional powers.
- Structures – Structures generally fall into two types: defensive structures such as walls and production structures that help players gather resources to play cards. A special type of structure exists called a Stronghold, which the player begins play with. If a Stronghold is destroyed through any means, that player is removed from the game.
- Wanderers – Wanderers are a rogue element that players must automatically put into play each turn. Wanderers have an aggression rating, and occasionally will attack. It is not uncommon to have a wanderer attack the player who put it into play.

== Products ==
Cards were available both in a one-player starter set and in booster packs. The starter set includes 55 cards (4 rares, 10 uncommons, 30 commons, and 11 fixed commons), 20 gems, 1 die, and a rule sheet. Booster packs include 12 cards including 1 rare, 2 uncommons, and 9 commons, including 10 which are exclusive to the starter. An expansion set titled The Undercity, was originally scheduled for release in 2005 in a booster-only format but was never released.

== Factions ==
There were three playable factions:

- The Glory of Kalim (religious faction)
- House Mosfin (political faction)
- The Veteran's Guild (economic/military faction)

Guild Darkmoor, which was to be released in the expansion set, was featured on one promo card released by Lucid Raven. Two additional unidentified factions have been seen on promo cards.

== Award nominations ==
Allegiance was nominated for Best Collectible Card Game or Expansion, as well as the People's Choice Award in the Origins Awards in 2005.
