= Gridiron Fantasy Football =

Collectible trading card game

- Designers: David Hewitt, John Myler, Paul Brown
- Publishers: Upper Deck
- Players: 2
- Playing time: Approx. 45 minutes
- Chance: Some
- Age range: 13+
- Skills: Card playing Arithmetic; Basic Reading Ability

Gridiron Fantasy Football is a discontinued football-themed collectible card game (CCG) first published in August 1995 by Upper Deck.

== Game overview ==
Gridiron simulates a football game that takes place in a dystopian "near-future", and features a violent and over-the-top backstory comparing the new style of the game to Roman gladiator combat. Each player uses a 60-card deck, primarily composed of Plays and Actions, which are further divided into Offense and Defense, along with Team cards, which encompass Star Players at various positions, Coaches, Franchises, Traditions and Formations that provide additional benefits. The goal is to be the player with the most points at the end of the game, which consists of a predetermined number of "drives", and opponents take turns playing offense and defense while attempting to score touchdowns and field goals without losing possession of the ball.

The actual gameplay closely follows traditional football, requiring the offensive player to progress 10 yards within 4 downs, and tracks the field position on a special playmat included in the starter decks. Cards feature icons corresponding to four traits (Power, Speed, Skill, and Mental) which are used to determine the success or failure of various plays. Plays which complete for higher yardage require more symbols to succeed, and defensive plays can reduce the yardage gained on a play. Players can punt, score safeties, or go for a 2-point conversion following a touchdown, and certain questionable tactics also include a "Referee Alert", used to try to give the offending player a penalty. The rules include options for both single games and fully organized leagues and seasons.

== Releases ==
The first and only set of Gridiron was released to both the hobby market and in general retail channels. As was standard for most CCGs of the era, the game came in 60-card starter decks, featuring a rulebook and a football field playmat with quick-start rules, and 12-card booster packs. To further enhance the collectible aspect of the game, there were 10 rare insert cards that were found in roughly 1 in every 10 packs or decks, and the inserts found in hobby boxes were different from the ones found in retail boxes.

Three expansions were originally planned for 1996, but were never released: Championship, Traditions, and Blacklist.
