= Codename: Kids Next Door Trading Card Game =

Collectible card game

Kids Next Door Trading Card Game
- The trading card logotype.
- Designers: Brian Tinsman, Brandon Bozzi, and Tyler Bielman
- Publishers: Wizards of the Coast
- Players: 2
- Skills: Card playing Arithmetic

The Codename: Kids Next Door Trading Card Game is an introductory-level collectible card game based on the Cartoon Network Codename: Kids Next Door cartoon. The game was launched in July 2005 by Wizards of the Coast.

== Gameplay ==
In an effort to allow players to play immediately without wading through detailed rules, gameplay is divided up into a simple Basic Game, and a slightly more complex Advanced Game. Neither has a complexity level on par with standard games in the genre, since the game is intended primarily for younger players.

=== Basic game ===
In the basic game, the two players flip a card over from the top of their deck and compare the battle number in the corner. Similar to the classic card game War, the player with the higher number wins the battle. The winning card is placed in the "WINS" area, while the losing card (or both cards in the case of a tie) is returned to the bottom of its owner's deck. The first player with 5 cards in his or her "WINS" area wins the game. The only complication here comes about if both cards are of the same color; in this case, the numbers are irrelevant, and players must instead be the first to slap a panic button located on the game mat.

=== Advanced game ===
The advanced game introduces the concepts of turn taking and the treehouse. In addition to a battle number in the top corner, each card contains a small snack icon in the lower right corner. This snack icon represents a resource which can be used to power-up other cards when the card is in the treehouse. Each player begins with a single card in their treehouse, and hence this card supplies a single full snack.

On each player's turn, he or she reveals the top card of his or her deck and decides whether to battle with the card, or to add it to the treehouse (where it stays for the remainder of the game). If a battle is selected, the battle is performed against the (face down) top card of the opponent's deck, so the outcome is not known in advance. During the battle, if either player is able to match the empty snack icons on their battling card to full icons being provided by cards in their treehouse, the card battles at the effective strength of its much higher power-up number, instead of using the battle number as it normally would. Note that the panic button rule from the basic game is also in effect, so players must be ready to react to a matched color at any time.

The victory conditions are the same, with the first player to win 5 battles winning the game. Players can score regardless of who initiated a battle, so it is possible to win at the end of the other player's turn.

== Creating cards ==
The product packages for Codename: Kids Next Door Trading Card Game contain a limited number of scene cards and sticker sheets, which are paired up to form custom cards. The scene cards are essentially just cards with a blank power-up area, waiting for one to be attached from a sticker sheet. Sticker sheets also include an equal number of small art stickers, but these are purely decorative, meant to be placed on top of the artwork of the scene card.

The game refers to the stickers as S.T.I.C.K.A.H.S., although it is unclear if this is a valid acronym.

== Products and product contents ==
The Codename: Kids Next Door Trading Card Game "Two-Player Starter Set" consists of two 20-card decks, 2 sticker sheets, 2 scene cards, a playmat, advanced rules sheet, panic button, and a booster pack.

Additional booster packs are available, containing 6 standard cards, 1 scene card, and 1 sticker sheet. Of the 6 normal cards, one is always a rare card, and there is a one-third chance that 1 of the other 5 common cards is instead an ultra-rare card.
