= Beholder Kft. =

Video game developer company

- Type: Limited company
- Industry: Book publishing Multiplayer games
- Founded: 1992
- Headquarters: Budapest, Hungary
- Key people: Miklós Tihor
- Website: www.beholder.hu

Beholder Kft. is a Hungarian book publisher and video game developer company. It was established in 1992 by Miklós Tihor and Zsolt Mazán. The name was chosen after the famous Dungeons & Dragons monster, the Beholder, to reflect their devotion to fantasy.

== History ==
The company's first project was a Hungarian language play-by-mail game, Land of Survivors (Túlélők Földje) programmed by Miklós Tihor in Borland C. Land of Survivors is a fantasy role-playing game, players develop their heroes by adventuring in a large playing area. The game is divided into turns. Each turn, a players sends his commands for his hero on a postcard to Beholder. They input the commands, and as a result, a laser-printed description of his adventures are sent back to him in mail. As of 2010, the game is still running, although most players send and get their turns in email instead of normal mail. There are players who are playing Land of Survivors for more than 10 years.

Beholder Kft. also began publishing fantasy and sci-fi books in Hungarian. Most of these were translations of English books (from Raymond E. Feist, Robert Jordan and other fantasy authors; or the Shadowrun and Battletech series from FASA Corporation). They also published some books from Hungarian authors.

In 1995, Beholder Kft. published its own Hungarian language trading card game, Cards of Power (Hatalom Kártyái), based on Land of Survivors. As of 2010, Cards of Power has published 9 editions of starter packs, 25 different booster packs, and a large number of mini-expansions. Currently, there are approx. 6000 different cards in existence. Cards of Power and the first three expansions were also published in Czech, by the name Wastelands.

In 1996, Beholder Kft. started a monthly fantasy magazine by the name Alanor Chronicles (Alanori Krónikák). The last, 149. issue of the magazine was published in 2008. December.

In addition to the above, Beholder published two more pbm games, Chaos Galactica (Káosz Galaktika), and City of Ancients (Ősök Városa). Chaos Galactica was a sci-fi game, City of Ancients a dark fantasy, played in the future of Land of Survivors. They also published two other trading card games, Chaos Galactica and Dreamcatcher (Álomfogó). The later was based on Dreamcatcher, the fantasy world of the Hungarian writer, Böszörményi Gyula. Beholder also organizes a large game fair in Budapest, Hungary twice every year, once in June, and once in November.

In 2002, Beholder launched its first Internet browser-based game, Land of Adventures (Kalandok Földje), programmed by Zsolt Mazán. Their next browser-based game was Dragonslayer (Sárkányölő), a completely free fantasy game. Its main purpose was to attract players to their other games.

In September 2008, Beholder published another browser game, Doomlord (Végzetúr). In Doomlord, you develop a fantasy character, and fight and compete with other players. Like with all Beholder games, new features are added to the game continually since its release. The game's unique feature is a built-in quiz game, with a database of approx. 200,000 quiz questions. As of March 2010, the game has approx. 50,000 registered characters from Hungary. In July 2009, the game's English language version was released, by the name Doomlord.

== Games ==
- Túlélők Földje (Land of Survivors), play-by-mail game (1992)
- Hatalom Kártyái (Cards of Power), trading card game (1995)
- Káosz Galaktika (Chaos Galactica), play-by-mail game (1997)
- Ősök Városa (City of Ancients), play-by-mail game (1999)
- Káosz Galaktika (Chaos Galactica), trading card game (1999)
- Kalandok Földje (Land of Adventures), browser-based game (2002)
- Sárkányölő (Dragonslayer), browser-based game (2004)
- Álomfogó (Dreamcatcher), trading card game (2007)
- Végzetúr (Doomlord), browser-based game (2008)
