= Arcadia (card game) =

1996 collectible card game

- Card back to the Arcadia CCG
- Publishers: White Wolf
- Players: 1–5
- Playing time: approx 30 min.
- Chance: Some
- Skills: Card playing Arithmetic; Basic Reading Ability

Arcadia is an out-of-print collectible card game involving combat and terrain, released in August 1996 by White Wolf, Inc. It is based on Changeling: The Dreaming, a tabletop role-playing game published by White Wolf and part of the World of Darkness series. It focuses on the world of the fae, who are changelings that draw on the dreams of humans. Quests, delineated and represented by cards, are completed by cards similarly representing Characters moving from one Terrain card to an adjacent one until the Quest is completed. The base set was called The Wyld Hunt and was sold only in booster packs. There were two types of booster packs, each with 15 cards: character boosters, which contained character and related cards; and story boosters, which contained cards about game settings, quests, requirements, and effects.

A single expansion set was released and called King Ironheart's Madness. The 405-card set was designed by Tim Byrd and included artwork by artists Tony DiTerlizzi, William O'Connor, and Robert Spencer.

An expansion called The Lion's Den was scheduled for a June 1997 release but never materialized. The three sets were to form a three-part story arc.

== Card types and gameplay ==
Each player chooses objectives, or quests, and plays upon the table Character cards that, together with modifying cards, move from one Terrain card to the next. Each player may play Waylay cards to thwart their opponents or opponents' progress through the terrain.
Arcadia has no starter packs; playing requires only one character booster pack and one story booster pack for each player, and two dice. Each booster pack includes a rulebook; dice were sold alongside the game.

=== Character packs ===
Character packs include Character cards, played on the table, and Merit cards, played on the character. Characters are defined by numerical traits called might, resolve, savvy and combat. Various types of Merit cards are used to modify these attributes: Advantages are special skills, Allies are additional Character cards placed on the table that add their skills to the main Character, Arts are special abilities of a magical nature, and Treasures are items of varied type and ability that can be retrieved from locations and carried by the Characters. Five points can typically be added to these attributes, although this number can be modified by taking Flaws, negative attributes which allow additional Merit points. Flaws are divided into three categories: Curses, special liabilities of your character; Enemies, a negative modifier when facing an opponent's Character or Allies of a particular name or faction; and Weaknesses, usually affecting the four defining stats.

=== Story packs ===
Story packs include League cards; when placed adjacent to each other on the table, they create a map. Each league has a terrain type or types, requirements to enter or leave, special effects, and what attribute you may recover if resting there. Quest cards give objectives; when the four requirements, or Attributes, for the objective are achieved, Experience points are awarded. The Experience total is modified by additional cards that were played on the League cards: Waylays and Treasures. Waylays and Treasures, within the limits of their terrain type restrictions and the total number allowed for each quest, can be played upon the League map. If the character and allies meet the conditions presented by the Waylay, the character may proceed.

== Reception ==
Lucya Szachnowski reviewed Arcadia: The Wyld Hunt for Arcane magazine, rating it a 6 out of 10 overall, and stated that "Arcadia's designers have come close to accomplishing the quest for the elusive RPG/card or board game hybrid. It manages to get across the right high fantasy feel, introduces a world that invites exploration, has a sense of ongoing plot and even gets across the idea that roleplaying isn't just about killing things."

The Wyld Hunt set was hampered by the scarcity of Terrain cards relative to the availability of Quest cards requiring those specific Terrain cards, although proxy cards could be used. This was remedied in the later King Ironheart's Madness version that was released in November.

Lucya Szachnowski reviewed Arcadia: King Ironheart's Madness for Arcane magazine, rating it a 6 out of 10 overall, and stated that "King Ironheart's Madness does contain my personal choice for Card of the Month: Mr Briefcase, human Magician - Mr Briefcase has all the cards!"
