= Banemaster: The Adventure =

Collectible card game

- Cardbacks to Banemaster:The Adventure CCG
- Designers: Alexander Duncan
- Publishers: Chessex/Tiger Ltd.
- Players: 2 or more
- Setup time: < 5 minutes
- Playing time: < 60 minutes

Banemaster: The Adventure is an out-of-print collectible card game by Tiger Ltd. and Chessex. The goal was to tell a story with your cards.

== Publication ==
It was released in August 1995. The original set had at least 305 cards, though the exact number is not officially known.

== Reception ==
Steve Faragher reviewed Banemaster for Arcane magazine, rating it a 3 out of 10 overall. Faragher comments that "it's an introduction to RPGs written by somebody who's never played one, that could only be found interesting by someone not yet into puberty."

According to John Jackson Miller of Scrye, the game is considered a failure, therefore the only remaining game element is determining the exact card list for the set. The company announced the set had 234 cards, but to date 305 have been documented. The goal was to tell a story with your cards.

Designed by Alexander Duncan, the game attempted to bring more role-playing game elements to the gameplay, but suffered from poor art choices, some of which were too gruesome for kids. Allen Varney of The Duelist reviewed the game as for "people with wood-burning stoves" suggesting the game was terrible.
