= The Doctor Who Collectible Card Game =

Collectible card game

- Card back for The Doctor Who Collectible Card Game.
- Publishers: MMG Ltd.
- Players: 2
- Setup time: Less than a minute
- Playing time: Approx. 10 minutes
- Skills: Card playing Arithmetic; Basic Reading Ability

The Doctor Who Collectible Card Game is an out-of-print collectible card game published in 1996 by MMG Ltd and is based on the British television series Doctor Who. A total of 301 cards were released in the main set, plus 1 additional promotional card.

== Gameplay ==
The Doctor Who Collectible Card Game is a game in which two players compete against each other as Time Lords, and each plays creatures and resources from the past, present, and future to battle the creatures of their opponents and destroy their Time cards, which represent a player's life energy. When all the Time cards are destroyed, that player loses. The game was described as playing three Magic: the Gathering games simultaneously.

== Reception ==
Andy Butcher reviewed The Doctor Who Collectible Card Game for Arcane magazine, rating it a 4 out of 10 overall. Butcher comments that "The rules and mechanics of the game are derivative, borrowing heavily from Magic: The Gathering and a few other combat-based games. The card design is poor, with a tacky 70s style font, garish colours and some low-quality computer graphics. The idea of three battlefields is a good one, but other than that, Doctor Who has little to recommend it." According to Jane Frank, InQuest magazine reviewed it as the worst CCG ever, at that time.

== Reviews ==
- Syfy
