= Star Quest (card game) =

Collectible card game

- Card back of the Star Quest CCG
- Publishers: Comic Images
- Players: 2 or more
- Setup time: < 5 minutes
- Playing time: < 60 minutes

Star Quest, also called Star Quest: The Regency Wars is an out-of-print collectible card game.

== Publication history ==
It was published by Comic Images and was released in August 1995. The first set, titled The Regency Wars, had 325 cards sold in 53-card starter decks and 15-card booster packs. Cards signed by the artist were also randomly inserted into some booster packs, and all starter decks included a random foil Homeworld card. It featured art from Frank Frazetta, Luis Royo, and Ken Barr among others. An expansion called Origins was planned for a January 1996 release but never materialized.

== Reception ==
Allen Varney of The Duelist said it was a "worse clone" of Magic: the Gathering.
