= Imajica (card game) =

Collectible card game

Imajica is a collectible card game based on the Imajica novel, and was published by Harper Prism in 1997.

== Gameplay ==
Imajica is a customizable collectible card game.

== Publication history ==
Inspired by the book, the Imajica Customizable Card Game (CCG) was released by Harper Prism in August 1997. The game was designed by Sean Curren and Hans Rueffert as a customizable card game for two or more players. Barker planned on writing Imajica: The Forgotten Gospels inspired by the game, and Curren and Rueffert would use this book as the source for a 120-card expansion set In Ovo planned for release in March 1998.

The game was released with a starter package that included two 60-card decks, and 15-card booster packs.

== Reviews ==
- Games #148 (Vol 22, #6), 1998 December
- Realms of Fantasy
