= SpongeBob SquarePants Trading Card Game =

Collectible card game

SpongeBob SquarePants: Trading Card Game
- Cardback to the SpongeBob Squarepants CCG
- Publishers: Upper Deck Entertainment
- Players: 2
- Setup time: < 5 minutes
- Playing time: < 30 minutes

SpongeBob SquarePants: Trading Card Game is an out-of-print collectible card game by Upper Deck based on the cartoon series of the same name. The game was first released in 2003.

Only two SpongeBob SquarePants TCG products were produced: one starter set, the Deep Sea Duel Starter Deck, which contained 27 unique cards and the Aquatic Amigos booster pack set, which contained 101 cards.

== Gameplay ==
Two players are opponents who each assemble a team that will try to convince the most denizens to eat a Krusty Krab Krabby Patty. The player that catches 4 customers from the game's locations wins.

Players shuffle their decks and draw 5 cards and drawing a card from the separate Location deck and placing it in one of four slots on the board. The active player then plays up to two Katchers from their hand under a Location in an effort to catch the location. The opponent may attempt to stop their effort by playing a Strategy card from their hand, or by playing a Katcher of their own. When players have no more cards to play, the final Katchers are compared and the one with the highest Patty Pouch wins. If the active player wins, they take the Location card. If the opponent won, they have thwarted their attempt and the Location card remains on the board.
