= Eve: The Second Genesis =

Collectible trading card game

- Designers: Pétur Örn Þórarinsson
- Publishers: CCP Games, White Wolf, Inc.
- Players: 2 or more
- Setup time: < 3 minutes (Note: Excluding deck construction)
- Playing time: ~ 30 minutes (Note: Games may take much longer or shorter depending on a deck's play style and the number of players)
- Chance: Some (order of cards drawn)
- Skills: Card playing Arithmetic; Reading; Logic; Strategy

Eve: The Second Genesis is an out-of-print collectible card game set in the universe created for the online game Eve Online. Each player represents the CEO of a corporation, aligned with a particular race, and through exploration, mining, and military strength, their goal is to defeat their opponent CEOs.

== History ==
In August 2006, the card game was previewed at Gen Con with a tournament.

Current status of the game is unknown.

== Play summary ==
Each player begins play with a starbase, located in their home region. Initially, this home region is the only source of ISK, which is the currency in the Eve universe. By playing cards from their hand, each card usually costing a certain amount of ISK, the player can do the following:

- build up their home region, strengthening their starbase or increasing its ISK generation capacity
- build ships
- explore outer regions
- cause events to occur using "news" cards

The player can also deploy their ships to defend outer regions, thus gaining ISK or other benefits from the region. Of course, a player can also deploy their ships into their opponent's home region, in an attempt to destroy their starbase. Victory is normally decided when only one starbase remains, or if a player runs out of cards in their draw deck.

== Card series ==
=== Core Set ===
The Core Set consists of 240 different cards and four Starter Kits. The Starter Kits are split into two different packs each containing two starter decks. The Day of Darkness Starter Kit consists of the Minmatar and Amarr. The Great War Starter Kit consists of the Caldari and Gallente. Each Starter Kit contains a total of 110 cards.

=== Expansions ===
==== The Exiled ====
In 2007, CCP announced the first expansion, called The Exiled. Originally scheduled for a July 2007 release, The Exiled was delayed due to three printing attempts and launched at Gen Con Indy on August 29, 2007. In addition to expanding the current card types, The Exiled adds characters which can act as agents at a starbase, or as pilots for ships.

== Reception ==
The game was positively received by RPG.net, who wrote that the game "is a great, albeit not very original, game. It will be tough to sell to gamers who have never played EVE Online before and it will be just as difficult to get computer gamers to play this CCG, but if gamers give EVE: The Great War a chance and are willing to look past Magic: The Gathering and World of Warcraft, they are sure to discover an excellent card game."
