= Firestorm Tactical Card Game =

Collectible card game

- Card back to the Firestorm CCG
- Publishers: Third World Games
- Players: 2 or more
- Setup time: < 5 minutes
- Playing time: < 60 minutes

Firestorm Tactical Card Game is an out-of-print collectible card game by Third World Games.

== Description ==
The original set was called Prime and had 284 cards. The game was considered difficult to learn according to the Scrye Collectible Card Game Checklist & Price Guide as the rulebook contained 92 pages.

== Publication history ==
It was first released in June 2001. An expansion called Enemy of My Enemy was planned for November 2001 but never materialized. It would have introduced two new factions: the Corsairs of Nephalis and the Tristan Corporation.
