= Force of Will =

Trading Card Game

Force of Will CCG
- Card back to the Force of Will CCG
- Publishers: Eye Spy Productions Pte., Ltd.
- Players: 2 or more
- Setup time: < 5 minutes
- Playing time: < 90 minutes

Force of Will (フォースオブウィル) is a trading card game. It was originally released in Japan in December 2012 by Force of Will Co., Ltd. and later released to English speaking countries in 2013. Since 2019, the game has been developed by TCG Co., Ltd. and released by Eye Spy Productions. It has game mechanics similar to Magic: The Gathering. The game has a tournament circuit called Grand Prix.

== Game overview ==
Each player starts the game with a main deck of 40–60 cards, composed of resonators ("summon spell"), chants ("normal spell"), additions, and regalia. In addition to the main deck, each player has a "Magic Stone Deck," a deck of 10-20 Magic Stone cards, which are used to produce the game's titular resource, "Will." The game is designed around "Ruler" cards. A Ruler is a special card that remains in a player's Ruler Zone, and often has additional abilities that inform deck building. A player may "perform Judgment" of a Ruler they control by paying a cost, flipping the Ruler card to its "J-Ruler" side, and putting it into the field as a J-Ruler. J-Rulers are similar to Rulers, but most also have attack and defense stats, and may participate in battle as though they were resonators.

A player wins the game by reducing their opponents' life points to zero, or by the opponent attempting to draw from an empty deck during their draw phase.

== Story ==
The story of Force of Will is printed in the lore of its cards and also written on several sites in different languages. It is a high fantasy story with many references to myths, fairy tales, and history. For example a main protagonist of the story is Grimm, named after the Brothers Grimm and a main antagonist is Nyarlathotep, a reference to a being from H.P. Lovecraft's Cthulhu Mythos.

== Availability ==
As a collectible card game Force of Will is sold in booster boxes and pre-structured decks (called Starter deck or SD). Only the two newest clusters of booster boxes are legal in "New Frontiers Format". The older ones are legal for "Wanderer Format" and "Arcana Battle Colossus Format" (ABC Format). A booster box contains 36 packs with randomized cards in that pool set and sometimes with promotional cards, a special pack that contains all special Fixed version (dubbed "God pack" which have 1 out of 6 boxes rate) or special pack (Memoria Collection in Hero Cluster booster box), while the pre-structured decks and collections are set with a fixed amount of cards of a specific type. However on each release of a new Expansion players can get a Pre-order kits, which including 72 packs, a set of promo cards (coded Pre-release Party) and two playmat of that expansion. Cards come in different rarities and versions. The rarity can differ from "normal" to "marvel rare" and a special rarity for "Ruler Cards". The number of versions differs from cluster to cluster, and sometimes a reprint version is available with some "erratas". Versions of the same card can be full-art, foil or monochrome; some of them are printed in different languages. Some cards are also given away as promotions in various events (such as promotion event PR, local tournaments WL / RL short for Wanderer Leagues and Ruler Leagues and Grand Prix WGP), and they often have different artwork from the original card.

== Game Format ==
Currently there are 3 formats available:

- Wanderer format: the current format available on official tournaments. All cards are legal except for the Valhalla clusters and cards that currently in "Banlist" or "Combination banlist". Each new expansion will bring the new Comprehensive Rule update and/or a new Banlist, however there are cases where emergency banlist are published due to game-breaking or unwanted interactions. In some cases, an "errata" version is published on official and that cards must follow that errata version, mostly in case of clarification or misprinted. All Wanderer games are being played as one vs. one with best-of-three or best-of-five format with a total fixed amount of time; in case the main timer run out the game will force into a 10-minute extra time or 0-1-2-3 rule whichever comes first. The gameplay set consists of a Ruler, a main deck (ranging from 40 to 60 cards in main deck except Typhon which allow player can have up to 200 cards), a side deck consist of maximum 15 cards, a stone deck consist of 10 to 20 stone cards and also a few more Extra areas depending on conditions. A player wins if:
  1. Opponent life points reached 0 or lower.
  2. Opponent cannot draw card if compulsory.
  3. Meeting specific defeat conditions (such as Typhon's heart destroyed, Belial abilities being cancelled when opponent reached 0 life point, allowing resolve God's Art from Extension Rule Seven Kings Land: A chapter of Betrayal, etc,.)
- New Frontiers format: an old format, currently being replaced by Wanderer. All cards that's been published in most two recent Clusters are legal, except for "Banlist".
- Arcana Battle Colossus (ABC): the latest format introduced in May 2023. Unlike the Wanderer format, ABC games are played with two or more players and there is no maximum number of players allowed in an ABC game (however Force of Will recommended 4 players). An ABC deck consist of an Arcana ruler, a 60-card main deck which consist of cards that corresponding to that Arcana attribute (one copy of each card is allowed, which including non-arcana Ruler and Sub-ruler) and a stone deck. No side deck, extra deck is allowed. Similar to the Wanderer format, ABC use its own Banlist and Combination ban list, plus having its own Comprehensive Rule for ABC for deck construction and gameplay. The game end if:
  1. A player got 3 winning crystals. That player will be declared as the winner of the game regardless of life points remain.
  2. A player has reached 0 life point and the player who makes the opponent reach 0 life point win the game.

== Card types ==
There are 4 types of cards: Ruler / J-Ruler, Resonator, Chant and Additions

- Ruler: cards that act as the player's avatar, which mostly define gameplay style and strategies. Some rulers do have some specific ways to activate Judgement skill (paying cost, ordering a Resonator or using contract process). Some rulers have specific activate abilities which can be used when necessary.
- J-Ruler: cards that can take form from a certain Ruler, bestowing it with powerful abilities. J-Rulers are placed on the field after being flipped over from its Ruler side and may participate in battles.
- Resonators are cards you summon to help you in battle, this type of card is the main unit that help player dealing damage. Some resonators come with special skills or abilities that may assisting player with various effects or hindering opponents. This type of card can be referred as Resonator spell or Summon spell.
- Additions are cards put onto the field that the player uses to affect their field or augment their Resonators or weaken opposing Resonators, as well as Ruler/J-Rulers.
- Chants come in a variety of types and effects. They are the magic cards cast in this game, allowing a player to support their Resonators with various effects, or hinder their opponent's Resonators. This type of card can be referred as Normal spell or Chant spell.

In the game there are two types of summon: non quickcast and quickcast

- A non quickcast is a type of condition which only allow player to summon during their main phase and cannot be cast during opponent's main phase.
- A quickcast is a type of condition which allow player who having priority to cast. Quickcast cards can be played during player main phase and opponent main phase if that player has priority.

== Cluster and expansions ==
The following series have already been published:

- Grimm-Cluster
  - CMF: Crimson Moon's Fairy Tale
  - TAT: The Castle of Heaven and the Two Towers
  - MPR: The Moon Priestess Returns
  - MOA: The Millennia of Ages
- Alice-Cluster
  - SKL: The Seven Kings of the Lands
  - TTW: The Twilight Wanderer
  - TMS: The Moonlit Savior
  - BFA: Battle for Attoractia
- Lapis-Cluster
  - CFC: Curse of the Frozen Casket
  - LEL: Legacy Lost
  - RDE: Return of the Dragon Emperor
  - ENW: Echoes of the New World
- Reiya-Cluster
  - ACN: Ancient Nights
  - ADK: Advent of the Demon King
  - TSW: The Time Spinning Witch
  - WOM: Winds of the Ominous Moon
- New-Valhalla-Cluster
  - NDR: New Dawn Rises
  - SNV: The Strangers of New Valhalla
  - AOA: Awakening of the Ancients
  - DBV: The Decisive Battle of Valhalla
- Alice-Origin-Cluster
  - AO1: Alice Origin 1
  - AO2: Alice Origin 2
  - AO3: Alice Origin 3
  - PofA: Prologue of Attoractia
- Saga-Cluster
  - EDL: The Epic of the Dragon Lord
  - MSW: The Magic Stone War - Zero
  - ROL: Rebirth Of Legend
  - ADW: Assault into the Demonic World
  - TST: The Seventh
- Duel-Cluster
  - GOG: Game of Gods
  - GRL: Game of Gods Reloaded
  - GRV: Game of Gods Revolution
- Hero-Cluster
  - NWE: A New World Emerges
  - TUS: The Underworld of Secrets
  - TWS: The War of the Sun
  - CMB: Crimson Moon Battleground
  - CST: Clash of the Star Trees
  - JRP: Judgement of the Rogue Planet
- Collaborations (each collaboration released do not related to any of the Clusters although still being considered as a part of that cluster)
  - SAC_2045: Ghost in the Shell SAC_2045 Netflix series (introduced in Alice Origins Cluster)
  - VIN1: Vingolf: Engage Knights (introduced in Grimm Cluster)
  - VIN2: Vingolf 2: Valkyria Chronicles (introduced in Alice Origin Cluster, however it considered to be a part of Grimm Cluster)
  - VIN3: Vingolf 3: Ruler All Stars (introduced in Lapis Cluster)
- Trinity-Cluster
  - TTT: Thoth of the Trinity
  - TSR: The Battle at the Sacred Ruins
  - TEU: Timeless Eclipse of the Underworld
  - TOPW: Ten Oaths of Protopaterpolis' War
- Master Piece Collection-Cluster
  - MP01: Masterpiece "Pilgrim-Memories"
  - MP02: Masterpiece Collection 02 "Fates Reunited!"
  - MP03: Masterpiece Collection 03 "Dimensional Hope"
- Evil-Cluster
  - DRC: Decent into the Raven's Catacombs
  - JRV: Journey to Ravidra
  - AVL: Attack on Velmardia
  - QSK: The Quest of the Seven Keys
