= The Dragon's Wrath =

Collectible card game

- Cardback to The Dragon's Wrath CCG
- Publishers: Fournier Naipes
- Players: 2 or more
- Setup time: < 5 minutes
- Playing time: < 60 minutes

The Dragon's Wrath is an out-of-print collectible card game by Fournier Naipes based on the science fantasy comic series El Mercenario by Vicente Segrelles. It was released in 1995 in France but had a small English print run. The base set had 134 cards. It had one other English expansion, also released in 1995, called Mercedarian and it contained 90 cards. A final expansion, titled El Enigma del la Ira was published in Spanish, and as Enigma in German.

The game story was nearly identical to Magic: the Gathering because it was a battle between two dueling wizards that used mana of four different colors. The game also had a unique effect where creatures could carry "Objects" if they had the "Hand" symbol. If one of your creatures killed a creature carrying an Object, they could begin carrying the Object so long as they had a Hand symbol too.
