= PowerCardz =

Collectible card game

- Publishers: Medallion Simulations
- Players: 2 or more
- Setup time: < 5 minutes
- Playing time: < 60 minutes

PowerCardz is an out-of-print collectible card game by Caliber Game Systems. It was released in July 1995. The first set was called First Strike and had 300 cards. The game was the first CCG to adapt an existing comic universe. It had one expansion titled Spawn and was released in September 1995 with 190 cards. It was based on the Spawn comic.

The game was described as "good, but not terribly exciting." Gameplay involved each player playing a character and then declaring an attack against an opponent's characters. Each character has several attacks and a few defenses. The character with the highest speed stat starts by attacking an opponent's character followed by characters with slower speed stats. As characters are knocked out, they lose their ability to act. A player without any characters loses.
