= Marvel Superstars =

Collectible card game

Marvel Superstars TCG
- Marvel Superstars card back
- Designers: Dave Humpherys, John Fiorillo, Jeff Liu, Justin Reilly, Dan Scheidegger, Ben Seck
- Publishers: Upper Deck
- Players: 2+
- Playing time: ~ 15 minutes
- Chance: Moderate (only in purchasing new cards)
- Age range: 12+
- Skills: Card playing Simple math Deck optimization Planning

Marvel Superstars is an out-of-print collectible card game published by Upper Deck that released in North America in March 2010. The latest cards in the Marvel series were the Uncanny X-Men series, which were on sale from July 5, 2022. The cards and game play were inspired by films based on Marvel Comics characters. It was the first collectible card game to use characters from Marvel films produced by different studios. The card art features scenes from the films.

== Gameplay ==
Marvel Superstars emulates battles between superhero and supervillain characters from the films. Each player selects a leader, which has 50 health. When a player's leader has accumulated damage greater than its health, that player loses the game.

In addition to the leader, each player uses three bases and his or her own deck of 50 or more cards.

== Card types and teams ==
There are four card types: Leader Characters, Supporter Characters, Actions, and Resources.

All cards except resources belong to a team. The teams are: Avengers, Fantastic Four, Marvel Knights, X-Men, and Villains.

== Featured films ==
- Iron Man
- Iron Man 2
- The Incredible Hulk
- Blade
- Blade II
- Blade: Trinity
- Ghost Rider
- Daredevil
- Elektra
- Punisher: War Zone
- Fantastic Four
- Fantastic Four: Rise of the Silver Surfer
- X-Men
- X2: X-Men United
- X-Men: The Last Stand
- X-Men Origins: Wolverine

== Product releases ==
Marvel Superstars booster packs contain 20 cards each. Cards have four possible rarities: common, uncommon, rare, or super rare. Super rare cards are foil. Each booster has 15 commons, including one leader and one resource, 4 uncommons and 1 rare or super rare.

Set Code	Set Name	Date	Featured Leaders
PE	Premier Edition	March 2010	Iron Man; Hulk; Mister Fantastic; Invisible Woman; Thing; Human Torch; Blade; Elektra; Ghost Rider; Doctor Doom; Magneto; Abomination; Professor X Storm; Wolverine
PS	Premier Starter	March 2010	Iron Man; Wolverine

== Organized play ==
Upper Deck planned on running an organized play program for Marvel Superstars, including weekly local tournaments called Marvel Fight Nights, and an annual World Championship event. With the cancellation of the product however, there has been no news of such play being formally organised.
