= Adrenalyn XL =

Football trading card game

Adrenalyn XL is a football trading card game produced by Panini.

== Overview ==
In 2010, it featured 22 of the 32 FIFA World Cup 2010 teams. The England players show only the player's heads and say England Superstar on them. There are 18 England Cards and they have 3 Champions Cards. There are 350 Cards: 250 Base Cards, 25 Star Players, 25 Goal Stoppers, 25 Fan's Favourites, and 25 Champions. Each card has a rating in attack and defence and an overall rating out of 100. They bear only a few differences from the Super Strikes collection, one of which is that the font on the cards are different and that they sport a FIFA World Cup 2010 logo at the top right hand corner of the card and at the back of the card.

In 2010, Panini also released a UEFA Champions League-edition, containing 350 cards from 22 of the competing clubs, including Barcelona, Arsenal and Lyon.

== Odds ==
The odds for each of the inserts was as per 2010/2011:

- Star player - 1 in 4 packets
- Goal Stopper - 1 in 5 packets
- Fan's Favourite - 1 in 8 packets
- Champion - 1 in 24 packets

The odds for each of the inserts is today (Nordic Edition in Denmark):

- Rising star - 1 in 6 packets
- Star player - 1 in 6 packets
- Fan's Favourite - 1 in 8 packets
- Goal Stopper - 1 in 11,4 packets
- Master - 1 in 15 packets
- Top Master 1 in 60 packets
- Legend 1 in 80 packets
- Scandinavian Star 1 in 80 packets
- Dansk Mester 1 in 80 packets

== Card features ==
Each card features an attack, defence, and an overall rating. They feature the player in the middle of the card and the player's team at the top left hand corner of the card. They also show the player's position (goalkeeper, defender, midfielder or forward) at the back of the card. Star players and Goal Stoppers sport a glitter foil effect while Fan's Favourites sport a rainbow foil effect. Champions sport a black/gold foil effect. The fourth edition of Panini FIFA 365 Adrenalyn XL was released for 2019, featuring top clubs, teams and players.

In 2026, Adrenalyn XL made its trading card game for the FIFA World Cup 2026, making it the biggest Adrenalyn XL game ever, with over 630 cards excluding rare limited editions.
