= Elementeo =

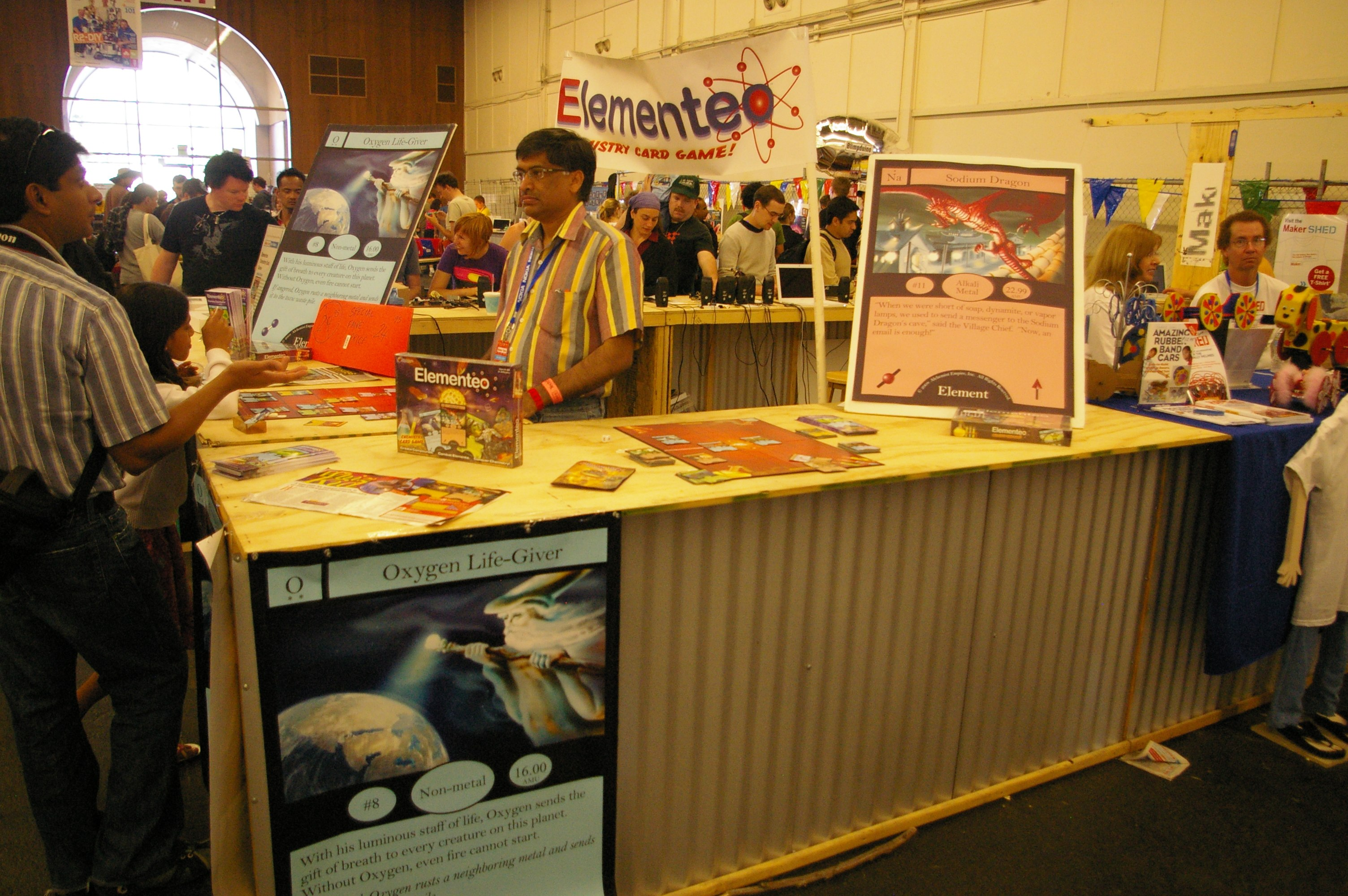
- Elementeo display at Maker Faire 2009
- Genres: Educational game
- Players: 2-6
- Setup time: <5 minutes

Elementeo is a chemistry-based card game in which elements have their own personalities—oxygen becomes Oxygen Life-Giver, sodium becomes Sodium Dragon, and iodine becomes Iodine Mermaid. Elements can be combined to form compounds and interact with properties and oxidation states. For example, Oxygen Life Giver rusts metals, Copper Cyclops shocks nearby element cards, and Helium Genie airlifts element cards. The goal of the game is to reduce an opponent to zero electrons by capturing them.

The Elementeo Chemistry Card Game includes elements, compounds, and alchemy cards (special cards that include black holes and nuclear fusion). The first version of the Elementeo Chemistry Card Game (v1) sold out in the summer of 2011 and an updated version with new cards was released in mid 2012. An Elementeo App was launched on the Apple App Store in April 2012.

== Overview ==
The game consists of a deck of 121 cards. Each card depicts a chemical as "monster-themed caricature". A card is one of three types:

Elements: Each element has a personality, illustration, and story. Each element card includes the element's symbol, atomic mass, atomic number, oxidation state, state of matter, and family or type. Elements move across the battlefield based on their state of matter—gases can move in all directions, whereas solids can only move one step at a time. The strength of the element in the game is based on one of its oxidation states. In The Elementeo Chemistry Card Game (v2), the Lewis dot structures are also included, as are new element cards including those for gallium (Gallium Gorilla) and vanadium (Vanadium Viking).

Compounds: Compounds are made from elements (i.e. sodium + chlorine = salt, NaCl) and range from salt and glucose to ammonia and carbon dioxide. Compounds have more strength and allow the player to advance to the objective more rapidly. Like elements, they have special properties. The Elementeo Chemistry Card Game (v2) includes new compounds such as citric acid and sodium hydroxide.

Alchemy: Alchemy cards in the game include "Black Hole", "Sizzling Supernova", and "Chemist Wizards". Alchemy cards take chemistry and physics concepts and bring them into the game. Black hole, for example, can use its gravity to take away an opponent's cards for a turn. The Elementeo Chemistry Card Game (v2) includes new alchemy cards such as Newton's Laws.

The "battlefield" of the game is a 5x5 array of card spaces, in which the player is free to move their elements on their turn. Elements move across the battlefield using their movement arrows, shown on the bottom-right of a card.

Goal: Each player's goal in The Elementeo Chemistry Card Game (v1 and v2) is to reduce an opponent's electrons (their IQ) to zero.

Turns: During each turn, a player execute three of the following actions:

- Place an element on the fortress row, and bring them to battle
- Move own elements and compounds on the battleground
- Attack the opponent's cards with own elements and compounds
- Create a compound by combining elements
- Use the properties (effects) of the player's elements to smash the opponent's cards
- Use Alchemy cards such as black hole or sizzling supernova

The Elementeo App: The Elementeo App includes 36 elements (first four rows of the periodic table) and allows users to create their own Elementeo cards.

== Development ==
Anshul Samar, the CEO of Alchemist Empire (and creator of Elementeo), developed a prototype of the game after receiving $500 from the California Association of the Gifted. He presented the game at TiECON 2007 while trying to raise capital to mass produce the game. Development occurred after he had finished his high school homework during weekdays, and for 5-6 hours each day on weekends. He declined venture capital investment as it would require "working 60 hours a week and going at a very fast pace", whereas he wanted to proceed at a slower pace while completing high school.

He officially released the game at the National Association of the Gifted Conference in Tampa, Florida on November 1, 2009. The app was launched at TEDx San Jose.

In 2007, the newly-established company had plans to develop similar games for biology, mathematics, and other fields.

== Reception ==
The cards have been described as "impressively illustrated".
