= Star Wars: Destiny =

Trading card game

- Designers: Lucas Litzsinger and Corey Konieczka
- Publishers: Fantasy Flight Games
- Years active: 2016–2020
- Players: 2 or more
- Setup time: < 5 minutes
- Playing time: < 60 minutes

Star Wars: Destiny is an out-of-print collectible card game by Fantasy Flight Games, first released in November 2016. Its final, 10th expansion was published in 2020.

The game also marked Fantasy Flight Games' return to making collectible card games, deviating from its focus on Living Card Games since 2008.

== Mechanics ==
Unlike many other card games, Star Wars: Destiny incorporated dice into its play.

== Sets ==
=== Awakenings ===
Released on December 4, 2016

The premiere set for the game included characters such as Darth Vader, Luke Skywalker, Han Solo, and Princess Leia Organa.

=== Spirit of the Rebellion ===
Released on May 14, 2017

The first expansion to the game provided many new options, including making discard, or mill, strategies viable, as well as boosting damage outputs. Important characters released included Obi-Wan Kenobi, Chewbacca, and several characters from Rogue One.

=== Empire at War ===
Released on September 14, 2017

Characters from Star Wars Rebels finally appeared in the game, including powerhouse Sabine Wren.

=== Legacies ===
Released on February 1, 2018

Legacies introduced the first new dice icon, Indirect Damage. Popular characters included Yoda, Battle Droids, Doctor Aphra, and highly demanded fan-favorite Jar Jar Binks.

=== Way of the Force ===
Released on July 5, 2018

=== Across the Galaxy ===
Released on November 8, 2018

=== Convergence ===
Released on March 28, 2019

New versions of Emperor Palpatine and Padmé Amidala were released. As the start of a new block of sets, Convergence introduced new themes and a new card type. Subtypes like Jedi, trooper, and leader, as well as an emphasis on new plots and powerful downgrades were included.

=== Spark of Hope ===
Released on July 5, 2019

Character versions of droids C-3PO, R2-D2, and Chopper were released, along with "tribal" characters such as Ewoks and Hoth Troopers, some without dice.

=== Covert Missions ===
Released on March 6, 2020.

Originally intended to be released in early October 2019, Covert Missions was delayed. In an August 30, 2019 Reddit AMA, FFG employee Andrew Navarro announced that Covert Missions would be delayed until Q1 of 2020.

Shortly after the announcement that Star Wars: Destiny had been cancelled, FFG announced that Covert Missions would be released January 17, 2020 as the final expansion. However, that never came to pass as FFG preferred to do a worldwide release for the first time ever. Before FFG had a chance to announce their updated release date, Alliance Distributing revealed March 6, 2020 to be the official date, later confirmed by an employee of FFG on Facebook.

=== Wild Horizons ===
After the announcement that Star Wars: Destiny was cancelled in January 2020, FFG did announce that a 10th and final set, Wild Horizons, was made and ready to go. However, due to the cancellation of the game, Wild Horizons would not be released in the traditional format. Instead, FFG decided that in summer of 2020, they would release it through an organized play kit under the title of Echoes of Destiny. Essentially, it would allow for players to earn 1 of each card and die for the set as prizes in tournament play.

Due to COVID-19 and the associated pandemic and worldwide quarantine rules which came shortly after this announcement, Echoes of Destiny never came to pass. In December 2020, FFG ultimately announced that Wild Horizons would never be released in any format, causing much speculation on the existence of this set to begin with, and leading to even more speculation on the truth of FFG's previous words.

Immediately after this announcement, an anonymous benefactor through various channels released a PDF file with all of the cards for Wild Horizons, albeit in an earlier, playtest version, and not what would be considered the final product. Regardless, fans were able to see the set that would have been, including the new mechanics, and an all new card color, Green, reserved for creatures and beasts within the Star Wars universe.

== Organized play ==
Star Wars: Destiny maintained a dedicated tournament circuit from its inception to its dissolution. Officially sanctioned prizes direct from FFG were a part of the game in every tournament format, from release parties, local store tournaments, and on up through large-scale events.

Keeping with traditional Fantasy Flight Games tournament structures, Star Wars: Destiny has held World, Continental, National, Regional, and local (store) Championships, with varying levels of prize support and exclusivity. For 2019, many of these were rebranded. Regionals are now Primes, for instance, and Nationals are Grands, allowing for more high-level tournaments in a single nation. Despite changing the names and dates of these types of tournaments, they have all remained a large part of the game, with many valuable prizes available at each.

Due to the COVID-19 pandemic in 2020, the world championship, originally scheduled for the beginning of May, was postponed indefinitely. In December 2020, FFG announced there would be no World's for that year, nor any future official organized play events.

World Champions
Year	Champion	Runner-up
2017	Daniel Weiser	Nick Obee
2018	Edwin Chen	Mads Utzon
2019	Andrew Rothermel	David Broberg

== Cancellation ==
Star Wars: Destiny was cancelled by its publisher on 14 January 2020.
