= Fantasy art cards =

A fantasy art card (also fantasy art trading card or fantasy card) is a small card, usually made out of paperboard or thick paper, which usually depicts fantasy, science-fiction, or horror artwork of a character, place or thing on the front side of the card. The back side of the card usually contains a short description of the picture, along with other text. Fantasy art cards are collected or traded, and are typically not playing cards though overlap between collectible card games is recognized because of the suite of artwork they often depict. Fantasy art cards generally showcase the artwork of a single contemporary artist, though a medley of artists, or a single intellectual property may be depicted too.
