= Top of the Order =

Collectible card game

- Cardback of Top of the Order card game.
- Designers: Duncan Macdonell
- Publishers: Donruss/NXT Games
- Players: 2 or more
- Setup time: < 5 minutes
- Playing time: < 60 minutes

Top of the Order is an out-of-print collectible card game by Donruss and NXT Games with a baseball theme using images of baseball players.

== Publication history ==
The game was first released in October 1995. The base set had 360 cards and came in 80-card starter decks and 12-card booster packs. An expansion was tentatively scheduled for a June 1996 release but never materialized.

== Gameplay ==
The game was said to resemble Strat-O-Matic in the amount of game detail.

Gameplay involved using only one type of card, the Player card. Each Player had 17 statistics. Offensive players would play a card representing the type of swing a batter is using, while the defensive manager would choose the pitch with a card play. To resolve the play, each player would draw the top card of their deck and compare them to one or more tables to determine the outcome.
