= The Game Crafter =

American board game publishing company

The Game Crafter, LLC
- Company type: Privately held company
- Industry: Board games, card games publishing
- Founded: 2001
- Founder: JT Smith, Jamie Vrbsky, Tavis Parker
- Headquarters: Madison, Wisconsin, U.S.
- Area served: Worldwide
- Products: Board games, card games, tabletop game components
- Parent: Plain Black Corporation
- Website: www.thegamecrafter.com

The Game Crafter, LLC (TGC) is a Madison, Wisconsin-based company that produces tabletop game components and custom print-on-demand card games and board games.

== History ==
The company was founded in 2001 by J.T. Smith, Jamie Vrbsky, and Tavis Parker. In July 2009 the company launched a web-based print-on-demand game publishing service that allows game designers to build and print custom card games and board games through a web-based system. In 2021, The Game Crafter was nominated for the Diana Jones Award.
