= Fantasy Adventures =

Card game

- Card back to the Fantasy Adventures CCG
- Designers: Bill Fawcett, Tom Smith
- Publishers: Mayfair Games
- Players: 2 or more
- Setup time: < 5 minutes
- Playing time: < 60 minutes

Fantasy Adventures is an out-of-print collectible card game by Mayfair Games. It was first released in June 1996.

== Publication ==
It was adapted from Mayfair's Encounters card game. The base set included 450 cards. It was sold in 100-card fixed starter decks and 15-card booster packs. The Wheel of Time expansion was pushed back to a late summer release to coincide with release of a Robert Jordan novel, but neither it nor the World of Aden expansion ever materialized. The game featured exceptional art for the time.

== Reception ==
Andy Butcher reviewed Fantasy Adventures for Arcane magazine, rating it a 6 out of 10 overall. Butcher comments that "Not outstanding, then, but simple to play and fun nonetheless. If you've got a younger sibling who's expressed an interest in these 'strange games' that you play, you could do worse than sit down and play this with them for a while..."
