= James Bond 007 (card game) =

Collectible card game

- Publishers: Target Games/Heartbreaker Hobbies
- Players: 2 or more
- Setup time: < 5 minutes
- Playing time: < 60 minutes

James Bond 007 is an out-of-print collectible card game by Target Games and Heartbreaker Hobbies.

== Publication history ==
It was released in November 1995 and was one of many CCGs released during that time that were based on a movie or TV franchise. The first set was called Goldeneye and had 207 cards and featured material from every film up to that time, even Thunderball. Some sources claimed the set had as many as 217 or 231 cards. An expansion called Villains and Women was scheduled for a 1996 release but never materialized.

== Gameplay ==
Gameplay involved each player assuming the role as the Directors of the British Secret Service and both played James Bond characters. Players deployed Missions, Villains, Obstacles, Locations, and Henchmen for opponents to fight, and if able, would also play a Plot stack each turn. Each Plot stack would make the mission more difficult. If you had the right cards to complete the mission, you scored points to win the game.

== Reception ==
Paul Pettengale reviewed James Bond 007: Golden Eye for Arcane magazine, rating it a 5 out of 10 overall. Pettengale comments that "It sounds great, but in practice very little gets done - it's too hard to get all of the necessary icons and scores together. Instead, each player builds up his own Plots until he has the required number, at which point he declares himself a winner. It's more of a race than a game of strategy."

The reviewer from Pyramid #20 said that "One thing separates Bond from 99% of the TCGs that have come out in the past year or two: Bond is a good game.

The game's combat system was said to be "pointless" as James Bond could not kill a henchmen unless he completed a mission the henchmen was attached to. James Bond would only be killed if he was wounded twice.
