= Universal Fighting System =

Collectible card game

Universus
- Designer: Ryan Miller
- Publisher: Sabertooth Games; (2006–2008); Fantasy Flight Games; (2008–2010); Jasco Games; (2010–2023); UVS Games; (2023–present)
- Release date: April 14, 2006; 20 years ago
- Type: Collectible
- Players: 2
- Age range: 13+
- Playing time: 10-30 minutes
- Chance: Some
- Website: uvsgames.com/universus

The Universal Fighting System (UFS), released in 2006 and rebranded as UniVersus in 2021, is a collectible card game published by UVS Games. Games of UFS represent a fight between two characters in hand-to-hand combat. Characters are drawn from original properties as well as a dozens of licensed ones, such as Attack on Titan, Solo Leveling, My Hero Academia, Mortal Kombat, Mega Man, Street Fighter, The King of Fighters XIII and Darkstalkers.

The game's sets and decks, released over a period of nearly twenty years, maintain full cross-compatibility. This allows players to combine cards from various licensed properties within a single deck and facilitates matches between characters from different fictional universes.

In 2021, Jasco Games, the longtime publisher of UFS/Universus, was acquired by POW! Interactive Holdings, after a $20 million funding round. In 2023, the company was rebranded as UVS Games, and the current card back image and orange color scheme was chosen.

== Gameplay ==
Players begin a game of UFS with the character they are fighting as in play. The character determines a player's hand size, starting vitality, and each has unique abilities for a deck to make use of. The main object of the game is to reduce the opponent's vitality to 0.

Unlike most CCGs, UFS does not have monsters, creatures or similar. Damage is dealt by playing attack cards, which the opponent may try to block with using a card from their hand. Each attack has stats for speed (how hard it is to block), the damage it will deal, and a zone (high, mid or low) that the opponent's block must match to avoid taking damage. Attacks often have abilities on them, and may be enhanced by abilities on other cards.

Also unlike other CCGs, the cost to play a card in UFS is not a set number of some resource. To play a card in UFS, players must pass a "control check". A player discards the top card of their deck, and compares its control value (in the lower right) to the difficulty of the card he or she is trying to play. If the control is equal to or above the difficulty needed, the card is played at no cost. If the control is lower, the player must "commit" (turn sideways) foundation cards equal to the difference, or else the attempt to play a card fails and the card is discarded.

Attempted cards get +1 difficulty for each card before it, and the turn player may continue trying to play cards until one of them fails, ending the turn. So the effective "cost" of a card can vary from zero to several resources, depending on its base difficulty, when it is played, and the value of the control check (which is not known until the card is attempted).

Players draw up to their character's hand size at the start of each turn, and with most cards being low in effective cost early in a turn, a typical turn of UFS involves around 3 to 5 cards played by the turn player, plus any blocks or other defensive cards played by the opponent if they are attacked.

The Universal Fighting System (UFS) features gameplay mechanics centered on high card turnover, multiple card abilities, and a "control check" risk-reward system. Strategic elements involve hand reading and defensive play, contributing to the game's reputation among CCGs for its technical complexity.

=== Deck construction ===
UFS has multiple formats, but most events are standard. Draft and sealed is used for release events, side events, or local change of pace, and there is also a now-unsupported smaller constructed format called Turbo. Additionally, there is Retro, the most popular eternal format of the game, allowing use of any cards printed from the first Red Horizon set in 2010 onwards, and Legacy, another eternal format which allows use of any cards printed.

A standard UFS deck consists of a minimum of 60 cards (including the character), and no more than four copies of a given card may be in a deck. Due to the large number of cards drawn during a typical game, it is common for decks to exceed the 60 card minimum in order to increase the variety of cards available. For turbo, a deck consists of exactly 41 cards (including the character) with the same restrictions of no more than four copies of a given card. In draft and sealed, players build decks out of random booster packs they either draft, or are given respectively. Draft and sealed decks are also a minimum of 41 cards, but any number of copies of cards may be used.

Deck building in UFS is driven by the resource symbol system. Each card has 3 symbols on it, representing various elements or concepts. Originally, cards can only be played if they share a symbol with the character, and only if that symbol is on all prior cards played that turn, referred to as "Symbol Chaining." The symbol chaining rule was removed from the standard format in 2021, but remained in the Retro format until 2026, when it was removed there to allow cards with the "Attuned" mechanic to be played as intended in Retro. Therefore, it is normal when building a deck to choose one symbol on the character, and include in the deck only cards that have that symbol.

=== Card types ===
There are six different card types in UFS, indicated by the color of their border and other traits:

- Characters – A card representing the combatant a player is fighting as. This is the centerpiece of a deck.
- Attacks – Attacks have an orange border. They represent punches, kicks, weapon strikes, and other moves used to deal damage to the opponent.
- Foundations – Foundations have a grey border. They represent a character's training and background, and are the primary resource used to help pass control checks to play cards.
- Assets – Assets have a green border. They represent locations or objects, and provide abilities more powerful than those on foundations, but cannot be committed to pass control checks.
- Actions – Actions have a blue border. They represent various maneuvers and have immediate effects when played, allowing a player to use abilities that were kept secret in their hand.
- Backups – Backups have a pink border. They represent allies and team members, and provide static & response abilities, and your opponent can attack them to destroy them.

== Reception ==
In 2008, Scott Jon Siegel reviewed the game for Engadget, noting that his "play experience with the game was not the most positive one", but stressing the subjectivity of his opinion.

The release of the Street Fighter-themed expansion was covered by the British gaming website Tabletop Gaming, in 2017 and the next year, the website also reviewed the game's Cowboy Bebop-themed expansion. The reviewer of the latter noted that "Once you slog your way through the rules, UFS can offer highly strategic and intriguing gameplay."

In 2024 the Attack On Titan-themed expansion was reviewed for the Comic Book Resources by Jenny Melzer, who gave the game 8/10, praising its artwork and multi-franchise nature, but criticizing the complexity of the rules. Same year, TheGamer covered the release of several of the UniVersus releases related to the Suicide Squad, Godzilla and My Hero Academia franchises; the website covered the release of the Critical Role-themed expansion in the prior year.

== Upcoming Releases ==
The following are listed on the UniVersus 2026 Roadmap alongside improved organized play and 20th anniversary events.

- King of Fighters XV Challenger Series.
- Godzilla Booster Set.
- My Hero Academia Challenger Series.
- TEKKEN 8 Booster Set.
- Street Fighter 6: Part Deux Challenger Series.
- Fairy Tail Booster Set.
