= Ophidian 2350 =

Collectible card game

- Lothar from Ophidian 2350
- Designers: Shaun Mahar, Gregg Schwartz, Raffi Tasci, Jason Robinette, Carl Van Ostrand, and Ed Lasso
- Publishers: Ophidian Games and Fleer
- Players: 2
- Playing time: Approx 30 min
- Chance: Some
- Age range: 10+
- Skills: Card playing Arithmetic; Basic Reading Ability

Released in 2003, Ophidian: 2350 is a collectible card game (CCG) created by Ophidian Games and Fleer. It uses a play structure called the Flow rather than the normal turn-based system typically used in the genre.

== Game Lore ==
Ophidian 2350 takes place in the year 2350, where a strange reptilian race known as Ophidians run gladatorial arenas for humans, aliens and demons alike. Combat consists of one team pitted against another, and though competitors often die, the gladiators' DNA is often taken before the match to resurrect the fallen warrior.

== Gameplay ==
Each player's team is made up of up to four gladiators, usually one of each victory point (VP) level (ranging from 1 to 4), but a team can technically be made up of any combination that adds up to exactly 10. A player can win either by defeating an opponent's gladiators, by defeating gladiators worth a greater number of victory points after four Waves (rounds) or by amassing 15 points worth of cheer from the audience.

Each side of the table is divided up into an action field, where powerful gladiators can attack and protect others from attacks, and a support field, where less powerful gladiators and supporting minions usually reside. Between waves, cards can move between the two fields as needed.

Some of the game mechanics are recognizable from previous games such as Magic: The Gathering - cards are "set" when activated, being rotated ninety degrees to show that they have been used, which is identical to "tapping" in Magic. However, the turns of previous CCGs are not present in Ophidian, instead replaced by the Flow.

=== The Flow ===
The Flow is the momentum-based system that replaces turns in Ophidian, and allows both players to be active at one time, one "with the Flow" and the other without it. All actions are either positive (denoted by a plus), or negative (denoted by a minus). Players can play only when they have the Flow, and whilst positive actions allow one to keep the Flow and play additional actions, a negative Flow action gives Flow to the opponent. It is also possible to expend cheer to change an opponent's positive action into a negative action, and thus force a change in control of the Flow. Certain actions (responses) can be played even without the Flow.

When both players have no further actions to take, the Wave (round) ends, with both sides taking a breather. When the next Wave starts, the Flow begins with the player who has the most damage on his or her gladiators (both alive and dead).

== Development history ==
In the late 1990s three college students (Shaun Mahar, Gregg Schwartz, and Raffi Tasci) created Ophidian 2350. The team spent 5 years developing the game before bringing it to market. The team signed with Fleer Entertainment to print and publish their game. They worked with some local playtesters and game designers to refine the game, adding mechanics like "Cheer" and "Reinforcement Gladiators." They built a “Lore” around the game and Fleer hired a professional writer to develop story content around that lore. Fleer created a tournament structure and developed special rules and prize support for the game. Fleer showcased the game at game conventions such as “Origins” and "Gen Con" and incorporated fan support into their web presence.

The game initially garnered positive reviews, including a five star rating from Scrye. However, after only three months on the market, Fleer pulled the product because of general financial difficulties arising from the faltering sales of sports cards, Fleer's primary product.

In 2013, the unsold inventory of Ophidian 2350 game cards was rediscovered. It was purchased to form the basis of Hack and Slash Games. In 2015 Hack and Slash Games acquired licensing rights from Ophidian Games with a plan to bring the game back to market with a convention tour and Kickstarter event.

In 2016, Hack and Slash Games released Ophidian 2360: Survival of the Fittest, a non-collectible version of the game. It features updated icons, templates, and artwork, but is completely backwards compatible with the Ophidian 2350 release. Hack and Slash Games plans to continue to release expansions for Ophidian 2360, updating most of the Ophidian 2350 cards over time with the updated icons and templates, and sometimes with new artwork as well.

In 2022, Hugo Ferreira under the banner of Ophidian Universe (Justich Fan Productions group) was granted permission to make and sell Ophidian 2350 CCG products based on the first 5 digital releases originally published on the Ophidian Games website as digital exclusives in 2004-2006.
