= The Duelist (magazine) =

Magazine covering collectible card games

- The cover of issue 20 of The Duelist
- Categories: Trading card games
- Frequency: One-Time (#0); Quarterly (#1-3); Bi-monthly (#4-20); Monthly (#21-)
- First issue: Winter 1993/1994
- Final issue Number: September 1999; 41
- Company: Wizards of the Coast
- Country: United States
- Based in: Renton, Washington
- Language: English
- ISSN: 1082-8621

The Duelist (or simply Duelist as it was renamed) was a trading card game magazine published by Wizards of the Coast.

== History ==
The first full issue was distributed in Fall 1993 as a quarterly magazine to accompany the increasingly popular Magic: The Gathering trading card game. Prior the 1st issue, a special one-time Duelist Issue #0 was released and given away at Gen Con 1993. This issue was eight pages that included a couple of news articles and a deck construction guide. It later became a monthly gaming magazine in March 1995 with simply a focus on the collectible card game and trading card game industry before publication ceased in September 1999. The magazine was based in Renton, Washington.

As Magic grew, a companion newsletter (The Duelist Companion) was sent out to The Duelist subscribers in between magazine releases; eventually this was dropped in favor of bimonthly magazine circulation, and still later a monthly magazine.

The Duelist ran for 41 issues (42 if Duelist #0 is counted). The magazine was replaced with Topdeck, which was canceled in February 2001 after 15 issues, partially due to cutting costs as a result of Hasbro's purchase of Wizards of the Coast, but also due to competition from Internet resources. Wizards was already publishing The Sideboard, which was dedicated solely to Magic tournament play that eventually was reborn as an online publication, and in The Duelist's wake, some of the content from the magazine merged with The Sideboard to create magicthegathering.com.

== Contents ==
What initially separated The Duelist from other card magazines of its time, such as InQuest or Scrye, was its detailed pages. Each issue featured a key artist who created a unique cover (often based on an existing Magic card) and whose art was showcased inside the issue; however in later issues, these art features were discontinued.

In addition to its artwork, the magazine also included articles on various strategies, game design articles, fiction from Magic storylines, product checklists, rules questions, Magic tournament coverage; even Magic puzzles were eventually introduced. Price-lists would be included as well.

Phil Foglio and his wife Kaja resurrected Phil's former Dragon strip "What's New?", which ran for almost the entire life of The Duelist, and a deck-construction column called Excuse Me, Mr. Suitcase? ("Mr. Suitcase" being a reference to the large collections of cards that some players would carry with them) was among the other regular features. Magic: The Gathering creator Richard Garfield often wrote the quizzical back column of the magazine.

The Duelist was known to occasionally give out promotional cards from upcoming Magic: The Gathering releases. In addition to Magic, it also served as a way for Wizards to introduce players to other products it owned, including the moderately obscure Vampire: The Eternal Struggle and the more popular Legend of the Five Rings. Other card games were profiled, such as Star Trek, Star Wars, and the Pokémon Trading Card Game. Magic gradually lost the magazine's focus as it put more emphasis on up-and-coming card games; with Pokémon's immediate North American success, The Duelist was converted into a dual-format publication, with general separate sections for Magic and Pokémon. By this time, it had already expanded to covering video games and others.

== Reception ==
The Duelist won the Origins Award for Best Professional Gaming Magazine of 1994.
