= Scrye =

American gaming magazine

SCRYE
- The final issue of Scrye: Issue # 131
- Former editors: JM White, John Jackson Miller; Joyce Greenholdt
- Categories: Collectible card games
- Frequency: Monthly
- Founded: 1994
- Final issue Number: April 2009; 131
- Company: SCRYE, Inc.
- Country: United States
- Language: English
- ISSN: 1540-0565

SCRYE (Scrye Collectible Card Game Checklist and Price Guide) was a gaming magazine published from 1994 to April 2009 by Scrye, Inc. It was the longest-running periodical to have reported on the collectible card game hobby. It was also the leading print resource for secondary-market prices on Magic: The Gathering. The name, a registered trademark, is adapted from the Middle English word scry meaning "to foretell the future through a suitable medium".

== History ==
Joanne M. White, publisher of the role-playing game magazine Cryptych, launched the magazine in mid-1994 after being introduced to Magic by its publisher, Wizards of the Coast's Peter Adkison, in July 1993. Issue #4, dated February 1995, was the first issue to carry a publication date, leaving the magazine's exact launch date difficult to determine.

In 1996 SCRYE published a second magazine as a market test. The magazine Mastyr, covered tournament Magic. Sales were not strong enough to support a separate publication and the features of Mastyr were rolled into SCRYE after a single issue.

White sold the magazine on November 15, 1999, to Krause Publications, which was later acquired by F+W Publications Inc. John Jackson Miller became the editor and added collectible miniatures game coverage to the magazine in 2000 prior to the release of Mage Knight. Under later editor Joyce Greenholdt, the magazine's frequency increased to monthly. Miller and Greenholdt also produced two volumes in 2001 and 2003 covering all collectible card and miniature games to date, the Scrye Collectible Card Game Checklist and Price Guide.

On Nov. 15, 2006, the magazine's publisher purchased gamingreport.com, an independent game news site, to serve as the official website for the magazine.

On January 29, 2009, the magazine's publisher sent an email to staff and contributors of SCRYE announcing their intent to cease publication of the magazine after the April 2009 edition, the magazine's 131st regular issue. In that issue, the magazine's editors suggested that the decision to cease publication was due, at least in part, to financial problems resulting from the 2008 financial crisis: "The reason behind this decision should come as no surprise to anyone who's been paying attention to recent events, both within our hobby and in the world in general...as things stand, we cannot continue to publish the magazine profitably while still providing the level of quality entertainment and information that you, our readers, need and deserve in exchange for your money."

== Contents and influence ==
White would send copies of Magic: The Gathering card lists to retailers before each issue, and they would mark the prices at which each card was sold. She collected this information into a spreadsheet in order to create a printable price guide with low, median, and high prices received from responding retailers, who were paid for their input.

Initially created as a price guide for Magic: The Gathering cards, SCRYE also provided prices and strategy tips for the many other collectible and trading card games that followed. In the mid-1990s, SCRYE and InQuest were, by far, the two CCG magazines with the largest circulation.

When collectible card games underwent a second surge of popularity in the United States with the 1999 release of Pokémon, White added translations of Japanese cards to the magazine.

The magazine has produced a number of affiliated one-shot publications, including ones devoted to Pokémon, Magic, and The Lord of the Rings collectible card games. The "Scrye counter", one of the earliest pewter miniature scorekeeping devices specifically designed for collectible card games, was produced in the mid-1990s by Reaper Miniatures through a licensing agreement with the magazine.

== Reviews ==
- Dragon #212 (December 1994) p94

== See also ==
- The Duelist
