= InQuest Gamer =

US magazine for game reviews

- Categories: Games
- Frequency: Monthly
- First issue: April 1995
- Final issue Number: September 2007; 150
- Company: Wizard Entertainment
- Country: United States
- Based in: Congers, NY
- Language: English
- ISSN: 1081-924X

InQuest Gamer was a monthly magazine for game reviews and news that was published from 1995 to 2007. The magazine was published by Wizard Entertainment (not to be confused with Wizards of the Coast, which produced its own CCG magazine, The Duelist).

Originally, the magazine was named InQuest and focused solely on collectible card games (CCGs); InQuest, along with its competitor Scrye, were the two major CCG magazines. Later, the magazine changed its focus to cover a wider range of games, including role-playing games, computer and video games, collectible miniature games, board games, and others.

== History ==
InQuest #0, the first issue, was published in April 1995. Because it was first published about two years after the release of Magic: The Gathering, the trading card game was one of InQuest's main topics. InQuest was frequently home to fictional cards, including "purple" cards featured in issue #22 (February 1997). These hypothetical cards, which used a new "Portal" land to create purple mana, led some to think that the then-upcoming Portal set would introduce a sixth color.

For issue #46 (February 1999), InQuest changed its name to InQuest Gamer (with Gamer in large text on the cover), clearly announcing that it was a magazine about games. Issue #53 made the InQuest title more prominent on the cover again and it was not changed after that, although the cover's format was revamped with issue #122.

== Content ==
Typical content included news, strategy articles, a price guide for collectible card and miniature games, reference lists, and game-related entertainment and humor. Issues with special cards were mailed in plastic bags, issues without special cards were typically sold at retail stores and game shows without any special covering.

== Editors ==
The magazine's editorial staff included Mike Searle, Tom Slizewski, Jeff Hannes, Brent Fishbaugh, Steve Frohnhoefer, Paul Sudlow, Jeremy Smith, Thorin McGee, Kyle Ackerman, Alex Shvartsman, and Rick Swan. Martin A. Stever was responsible for the magazine's sales and marketing.

The magazine ceased publication in September 2007.

== See also ==
- Games Unplugged
- The Space Gamer
