= Booster pack =

Sealed package of cards or figurines

Various foil booster packs from different collectible card games, each containing a small number of playing cards.

In collectible card games, digital collectible card games and collectible miniature wargames, a booster pack is a sealed package of cards or figurines, designed to add to a player's collection. A box of multiple booster packs is referred to as a booster box.

Booster packs contain a small number of randomly assorted items (8–15 for cards; 3–8 for figurines). Booster packs are the smaller, cheaper counterparts of starter decks, though many expansion sets are sold only as booster packs. While booster packs are cheaper than starter packs, the price per item is typically higher. Booster packs are generally priced to serve as good impulse purchases, with prices comparable to a comic book and somewhat lower than those of most magazines, paperback books, and similar items.

In many games, there is a fixed distribution based on rarity, while others use truly random assortments. When the distribution is based on rarity, booster packs usually contain one or two rares, depending on the game, while the remainder are of lesser rarity.

== Examples of sizes ==
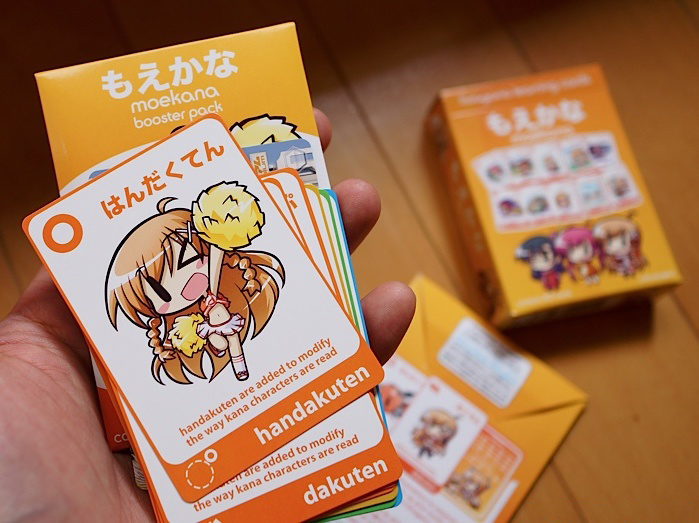
An open cardboard booster pack for the Moekana educational card game, revealing nine additional cards for the game.

In the Magic: The Gathering expansions Legends, The Dark, Arabian Nights, Fallen Empires, and Antiquities, cards were sold in 8 card booster packs. In Limited Edition Alpha and Limited Edition Beta, as well as from Unlimited Edition onward, the cards were sold in 15 cards per booster: 11 commons, 1 rare, and 3 uncommons; Core Set boosters contain a basic land as one of the commons. Starting with the Alara block, booster packs for both Core Sets and expansions began to contain 1 land, 10 commons, 3 uncommons, either 1 rare (7/8 chance) or 1 mythic rare (1/8 chance), and either a tip card (which explains the new rules in the set, such as exalted in the Alara Block or Infect in the Scars of Mirrodin Block) or a token (which is of a type produced by a card in the set). Roughly one in every four booster packs contain a foil card, which can be of any rarity, including basic land.

The Pokémon Trading Card Game originally had 11 cards per booster pack – 1 rare card, 3 uncommons, and 7 commons. With the release of the E-Series, it became 9 cards per booster – 5 commons, 2 uncommons, 1 reverse holo, and 1 rare. This became 10 cards after the release of Diamond and Pearl, with 3 uncommons instead of 2. Starting in the Sun & Moon expansion, there is also a basic Energy card in every booster pack. As of the Scarlet & Violet expansion, there are up to 2 reverse holo cards.

HeroClix uses 5 figure boosters. A booster contains 2 or 3 commons, 1 or 2 uncommons, and 1 rare, but super-rare or chase figures may replace one of the other figures in the box (which is replaced varies based on the set). Prior to the Avengers set, HeroClix typically used 4 figure boosters with a much more complicated six-tier rarity scheme, with a few exceptions such as the Fantastic Forces set, which had three figures boosters because of the larger size of many of the pieces, and the 1 or 2 figure boosters formerly marketed at retail stores.

== Starter deck ==
A starter deck (also known as an intro deck, battle box, and other terms) is a box of cards or figurines designed as an entry point into a CCG or collectible miniature game for beginners. Starter decks are typically pre-constructed though they can also be random. Non-random cards may sometimes be referred to as "fixed" cards. Typically they are intended as a launching point, with an encouragement for further purchases to modify and improve these decks or sets.

Starter decks may contain any number of items, including rulebooks, playmats, counters, dice, storage boxes, and common cards such as "basic land" in Magic: The Gathering, and other items. Some starter decks are meant for two players, so that a single set can be used instead of each player buying one separately.
