= Jedi Knights Trading Card Game =

2002 Star Wars trading card game

- Jedi Knights TCG 1st print booster pack
- Publishers: Decipher, Inc.
- Players: 2 or 4
- Setup time: < 2 minutes
- Playing time: ~ 30 minutes
- Chance: Medium to high
- Skills: Card playing; Arithmetic; Reading

Jedi Knights Trading Card Game is an out-of-print collectible card game set in the Star Wars Universe and published by Decipher, Inc. on April 25, 2001. Two expansion packs, titled Scum and Villainy and Masters of the Force, were produced before the end of 2001. Shortly after their release, Decipher lost the license to utilize material from the Star Wars franchise and was forced to discontinue the game.

== Overview ==
Jedi Knights is centred on the classic trilogy (A New Hope, The Empire Strikes Back, and Return of the Jedi). Unlike its predecessor, the Star Wars CCG, expansions for Jedi Knights are connected with specific aspects of all three films rather than particular settings from each film taken separately. From the very release of the game its collectible nature was underlined by the existence of silver and gold foil cards, whose rarity was clearly specified by the publisher, and cards with "1st time in print" icon.

=== Card design ===
An example of the stereoscopic effect on a Jedi Knights card. The card art is also computer generated.

Jedi Knights cards do not contain images taken from the original movies, as it was for the Star Wars CCG. Instead, art is computer generated. One particular quality of the visuals in the game is that card arts often portray events and characters from the films from a perspective or angle that were absent in the film or depict situations mentioned but not shown in any of the three films. Additional value has been added to the cards by adding stereoscopic effect to certain designated cards. Another addition to classic card design were 'flip movie' cards, which contained arts taken from a continuity of images that, when viewed in a specific sequence, form an animated series. There were two of those 'movie' sequences: the opening scene from A New Hope—the Tantive IV being chased by the Imperial cruiser Devastator and starfighter flight in the Death Star trench.

== Basic gameplay concepts ==
Gameplay mechanics of Jedi Knights differ greatly from those present in previous Star Wars card games by Decipher, Inc., those being Star Wars CCG and Young Jedi TCG. The goal of the game is to gain control over as many locations as possible while characters and starships battle one another on sites and planetary orbits. Unlike its predecessors, Jedi Knights does not have a clear-cut differentiation between "light side" and "dark side" decks, although certain cards can only be used by a particular side.

=== Card features ===
Each card has a Destiny number from 0 through 7 printed over allegiance icon: Light Side, Dark Side and Independent, the latter usable by either side of the conflict. Character and starship cards in Jedi Knights are distinguished by Power and Defense attributes, the first defining combat prowess and the second defining the ability to withstand weapon attacks. Each starship and character card (along with some of the weapon cards) has a deploy cost and some of them have leadership icons designating the ability to be supported in combat. Also, character, starship and weapon cards may have a certain theme colour that influences deck design, although grey ('themeless') cards are also present.

=== Theme ===
Each deck needs a 'theme': a theme card and theme hero; those provided in the premiere release are: Han Solo (green theme colour), Luke Skywalker (yellow), Grand Moff Tarkin (blue) and Darth Vader (red). The theme influences gameplay and deck construction by settling who goes first in the game and by favouring characters and items compatible with it, yet cards with different theme colour are still usable.

=== Force deck ===
The force deck specifies the number of cards drawn by a player and serves as resource necessary to deploy characters, weapons and starships. The force deck includes eight force cards with numbers 1 through 8 which must be of one colour (basic colour released in premiere is green), although black wild cards are also available.

=== Combat ===
Combat is resolved on the basis of character and starship battles. The principle of drawing Destiny (drawing a card from deck and using the Destiny number printed on it) has been retained from Star Wars CCG, although the Destiny number applies solely to weapon targeting.

=== Goal ===
The game is played with the use of four double-sided cards presenting system/site locations (Tatooine, Bespin, Hoth and Endor) revealed one after the other, each turn taking place on different location. The main purpose of the game is control as many locations as possible. Control over a location is checked by tallying up total power of characters. The player with the greater total is considered 'in control' of a location. The game is won when one of the players controls the majority of locations of the game.

== Expansions ==
Jedi Knights TCG booster pack

=== Scum and Villainy additions ===
The first expansion pack (released in July 2001) contained new themes of Leia Organa (purple), Obi-Wan Kenobi (blue), Boba Fett (yellow) and Jabba the Hutt (orange). A new force card colour (orange) was also added. This expansion pack was focused on Independent characters, mainly bounty hunters, and added the possibility of creating an Independent-themed deck.

=== Masters of the Force additions ===
In the second expansion (released in October 2001) force power cards debuted. New themes of Yoda (red) and Emperor Palpatine (purple) were also added, along with blue-colored force card set. The main aspect of this expansion is the use of the Force.

== Past world champions ==
Year	Champion
2001	Brian Muller - Freedom Con (1st Official Decipher World's Championship
2002	Bertrand Mayer - French Convention (2nd Official Decipher World's Championship)

== Reviews ==
- Pyramid
- Syfy
