= Frank K. Berry =

American magician and chess organizer

Berry, photographed c. 2012

Frank Kimball Berry (June 15, 1945 – June 6, 2016) was an American chess administrator with the rank of International Arbiter and Organizer. He was also a magician, historian, and banker from Stillwater, Oklahoma. He was best known for sponsoring two U.S. Chess Championships (2007-8) and as one of just a few American FIDE International Arbiters. He organized and directed chess tournaments of all sizes for more than 55 years. His diverse career included military service as a paratrooper from 1966 through 1968 with the 101st Airborne Division. He was involved in banking as a credit manager with 3M Financial and was a major stockholder in Southwest Bancorp. He was a performing member at the Magic Castle in Los Angeles and Arbiter at the GM Eduard Gufeld Chess Club in Hollywood when he lived in California from 1977 to 2002.

== Early life and family ==
Berry was born on June 15, 1945, in Washington, D.C., to George M. Berry and Monica (Bishop) Berry and grew up in Stillwater, Oklahoma. He graduated from Oklahoma State University in 1970. He was the twin brother of former U.S. Chess Federation president and fellow tournament organizer Jim Berry.

== Chess organizer and tournament director ==
Berry was an active chess organizer who organized, hosted, and directed hundreds of chess events of all sizes from 1961 to 2016. Some of the most notable of these were the original North American Open, several U.S. Women's Championships, the first U.S. Girl's Invitational Championship held in 2015 in Tulsa, a U.S. Senior Open, a U.S. Junior Invitational Championship, two U.S. Championships, the Dream Team Challenge (supporting the women's 36th Chess Olympiad team), several international norm events, and even an eight-game match between Grandmasters Yury Shulman and Aleksander Wojtkiewicz in 2005.

== Historian and “chess conservationist” ==
Berry was an avid historian who served as editor for the Payne County Historical Society. He compiled a history of Oklahoma chess, which included a list of state champions going back more than 100 years. He published the Oklahoma Chess Quarterly from 2002 until his death in 2016.

He also hunted for regional chess games in newspapers and magazines dating back over 100 years and preserved them in a ChessBase database. Dating back to 1914, the Okie Database contains over 16,000 games played in Oklahoma or by Oklahoma players out of state. It includes little-known games by Samuel Reshevsky, Reuben Fine, Herman Steiner, Israel Albert Horowitz, and even the young Bobby Fischer (who played in the 1956 U.S. Open Chess Championship in Oklahoma City).

Describing Berry's work to preserve Oklahoma's chess history and his prolific legacy as a tournament director and mentor, Berry's friend and fellow tournament organizer Tom Braunlich called him a "chess conservationist who endeavors to preserve and protect the past, present, and future [of chess] in the heartland of the country."

== Chess player ==
Berry was also a competitive chess player for over 50 years, with a "Class A" rating, and played more than 1,600 USCF-rated games. He once defeated 9-year-old Fabiano Caruana, who would later become a world championship candidate in 2018. Years later, Berry jokingly stated that "I rolled him up like a burrito!"

Berry was noted for a droll sense of humor, such as saying at the start of each tournament, "Remember, not all trappers wear fur hats!"

== Death and legacy ==
Berry died of a heart attack, aged 70, on June 6, 2016, at his home in Stillwater, Oklahoma. The Frank K. Berry Memorial Open chess tournament is held annually in May in his honor.

== Awards and recognition ==
Berry was a two-time recipient of the Gold Koltanowski Award, the highest member award given by the U.S. Chess Federation each year. He won the award in 2007 and 2015. He was named the U.S. Chess Federation "Tournament Director of the Year" in 2008.
