= The Lord of the Rings Trading Card Game =

Collectible card game

Lord of the Rings: Trading Card Game
- Card back
- Designers: Mike Reynolds, Chuck Kallenbach II, Tom Lischke, and Joe Alread
- Publishers: Decipher, Inc.
- Years active: 2001–2007
- Players: 2 or more
- Setup time: < 5 minutes
- Playing time: < 60 minutes
- Chance: Some
- Skills: Card playing Arithmetic

The Lord of the Rings Trading Card Game (a.k.a. LOTR TCG) is an out-of-print collectible card game produced by Decipher, Inc. Released November 2001, it is based on Peter Jackson's The Lord of the Rings film trilogy and the J. R. R. Tolkien novel on which the films were based. Decipher also had the rights to The Hobbit novel but did not release any cards based on it. In addition to images taken from the films, in 2004 Weta Workshop produced artwork depicting characters and items from the novel absent from the films for use on cards. In 2002, LOTR TCG won the Origins Awards for Best Trading Card Game of 2001 and Best Graphic Presentation of a Card Game 2001. Decipher's license to The Lord of the Rings expired on July 30, 2007, after which all official promotion and distribution of the game stopped.

The game also had an online version that maintained identical gameplay as well as a market economy. However, since the game's print run has ended, sales for online cards have been stopped and the servers closed in June 2010.

== Game concept ==
The Lord of the Rings Trading Card Game is a game for two or more players, each of who uses his or her own deck consisting of equal numbers of Free Peoples and Shadow cards, with a minimum of 30 of each. On a player's turn they are considered to be the Free Peoples player and their Fellowship and Free Peoples cards both in their Support Area and on their characters are active. A player uses his Free Peoples cards to attempt to traverse the site-path and destroy the One Ring by reaching the ninth site. Each of his or her opponents, the Shadow Players, use their Shadow cards to prevent this by attempting to kill or corrupt the ring-bearer, or by forcing the Fellowship to slow down long enough for their Fellowship to race to victory. At the end of each turn the position of Free Peoples player rotates to the next player in turn. The game is won by the first Free Peoples player to survive to the ninth, and final, site or the last player whose Fellowship is left alive or when you corrupt the opposing fellowships ring-bearer.

An innovative mechanic called the twilight pool is used as a costing mechanism for cards. Each card has a numerical cost (which can be zero). When the Free Peoples player plays a card, tokens are added to the twilight pool equal to the cost of that card. The Shadow players, however, remove twilight tokens equal to the twilight cost of their cards in order to play their cards. Thus the more powerful cards the Fellowship the Free Peoples player plays, the greater the threat from the Shadow players. Each Free People and Shadow card belonged to a specific culture such as Gondor, Gollum or Isengard with cards within a culture complementing or even requiring one another, but players were free to construct their decks with a mix of cards from any culture.

Throughout a game, a player will play companions (or Free People characters) to help defend the ring-bearer. When it is his turn to play as the Shadow player, he then can play minions (or Shadow characters) to attack the opponent's companions. The Free People's player (the defender) has the opportunity to choose which of his companions will fight in one-to-one duels, called skirmishes, with the opponent's minions. This is called assignment. Since the Free Peoples player wants to defend his ring-bearer, the only way a Shadow player can attack the Free Peoples player is by playing more minions than the Free Peoples player has companions, thus allowing the Shadow player to assign extra minions to any companion he chooses, including the ring-bearer, or by using minions whose game text allows the Shadow player to assign them to the ring-bearer. The character in a skirmish with less strength takes a wound, but if the total difference in strength is double or higher, the losing character is killed immediately instead. Other types of cards are possessions that character can bear to gain additional bonuses, conditions that retain their effect until they are discarded and events, which are discarded immediately after being used.

However, the Ring-bearer does not only face minions on his journey to destroy the Ring. The Ring-bearer has to resist the temptation of the Ring. In the trading card game, when the ring-bearer succumbs to the temptation of the Ring, burdens are added and most versions of the One Ring enable the Ring-bearer to take burdens instead of impending wounds. Each companion has a given resistance stat, and whenever a burden is added, each companion's resistance is lowered by one. Once the ring-bearer's resistance reaches zero, he is corrupted by the power of the ring and the player is eliminated from the game.

== Game sets and distribution ==
When the game's run had ended in mid-2007, nineteen sets in total had been released. Three of expansions (Expanded Middle-earth Deluxe Draft Box, The Wraith Collection, and Age's End) were not available in booster packs.

=== The movie years ===
For the first three years the game's releases followed the movies. A 365 "base set" was released each November containing material from the upcoming movie. These were followed by two 122 card expansions at four-month intervals. Each base set and the following two expansions formed a "block" named for that base set.

Cards were sold in eleven card booster packs consisting of one rare, three uncommon and seven common cards. In approximately one in six packs a common was replaced by a foiled version of a random card from that set. Each set also had two sixty-three card starter decks containing two copies of a promotional face card, three random rares and sixty fixed commons/uncommons (sets 5 and 6 had sixty card starters with three alternate image rares in place of the random rares).

Between the second and third expansions of The Return of the King block an extra set, Reflections, was released. This consisted of 52 new cards, all foiled, half of which were designated rare plus and half rare. The new cards took material from all three films and material produced by Weta specifically for the game and did not belong to any block. Reflections boosters contained two of the new cards (with one R+ every 2.4 packs) and sixteen repackaged random cards from the first six sets. One of these old cards was always non-English.

=== Shadows and beyond ===
In November 2004 the new base set, Shadows, marked an overhaul to the game. All sets would contain sixty rare, uncommon, and common cards each, in addition to a varying amount of fixed cards, only available in Starter Decks. Instead of foiling every card, each expansion would only have eighteen pre-selected rare foil cards that would be randomly inserted into one out of every seven booster packs. Shadows also had four, rather than two, different starter decks. The material used for the cards would also cover the entire trilogy instead of being tied to the films' releases.

Additionally, a system of rotation was announced to be introduced to the game. Starting in March 2005, the entire Fellowship block ceased to be legal for use in the Standard tournament format. Then, each November, the oldest block remaining would also be "rotated out". Decipher claimed this helped keep the card pool down to a manageable size and would keep established players buying new cards. Detractors claimed it was a money grab and did not like being forced to purchase what they felt were inferior cards.

=== Set list ===
Where two dates are listed, the first date refers to starter decks and the second to booster packs:

1. The Fellowship of the Ring (November 6, 2001) - The first base set that introduced the core mechanics of the game. The cards were divided between [Dwarves], [Elves], [Gandalf], [Gondor] and [Shire] cultures on the Free People sides and [Isengard], [Moria], [Ringwraith] and [Sauron] cultures on the Shadow side. The set is notable for having the largest number of Ally type of cards, characters who did not travel with the Fellowship and only provided aid through special abilities. Each subsequent set would see increasingly fewer Ally cards released, until they were completely phased out. It was sold in 50-card starter decks and 11-card booster packs.
2. Mines of Moria (March 6 & 13, 2002) - The first game expansion introduces the Artifact type of cards, which functioned similarly to possessions, but did not suffer penalties from cards directly targeting them. This expansion significantly boosted the [Dwarves] and [Moria] faction, most notably featuring the Balrog, which posed a significant danger to the Free People at the unavoidable "The Bridge of Khazad-dûm" site.
3. Realms of the Elf-lords (June 19 & July 3, 2002) - This set significantly boosted the [Elves] and [Isengard] cultures by adding a large number of Elven allies, introducing Isengard orcs in addition to the Uruk-hai and featuring the first playable versions of Saruman.
4. The Two Towers (November 6, 2002) - The second base set brought the first significant overhaul of the game scene. The set contained no cards of [Moria], [Ringwraith] and [Sauron] cultures; instead new Shadow cultures of [Dunland] and [Raiders] (which combined the Southrons and the Easterlings) were added along with the [Rohan] Free People culture, and each culture now contained cards which could contain a number of that culture's tokens. The site path from The Fellowship of the Ring was completely replaced with the new sites from The Two Towers, and sites could now be controlled by Shadow Players and liberated by the Free Peoples.
5. Battle of Helm's Deep (March 12, 2003) - This set brought back the [Sauron] culture and also introduced the new [Gollum] culture, which reflecting the character's duality consisted of both Free People and Shadow cards, which could alternatively reinforce or combat one another.
6. Ents of Fangorn (July 2, 2003) - This set brought back the [Ringwraith] culture and introduced new versions of the Ents which were more pro-active in combat than the previous versions, which had specific requirements to be allowed to skirmish. It also contained new cards of the [Moria] culture, including a version of the Balrog who could be played on sites other than Underground.
7. The Return of the King (November 5, 2003) - In addition to completely replacing the site path once again, the third base set added the new mechanics of threats (tokens that had to be assigned as wounds when a companion or ally was killed) and initiative, which either Free Peoples or Shadow player had based on the number of cards in their hands. This set contained no cards of [Dunland], [Isengard] and [Moria] cultures, but added Minas Morgul orcs to the previously Nazgûl-only [Ringwraith] culture.
8. Siege of Gondor (March 10, 2004) - This set significantly boosted the [Raiders] culture by enhancing it with the Corsairs of Umbar and added the Dead Men of Dunharrow to the [Gondor] culture. It also introduces Shelob as the only other minion for the [Gollum] culture and featured characters with the powerful keyword enduring, who increased in strength after gaining each subsequent wound.
9. Reflections (May 12, 2004) - Released in between two expansions of The Return of the King block, this special set was the most innovative at the time. Characters from the Prologue of The Fellowship of the Ring such as Elendil and Gil-Galad were introduced for the first time and characters from the books that were absent from the movies such as Glorfindel and Tom Bombadil were added through the designs created by Weta Workshop specifically for the game. Most importantly, characters other than Frodo were allowed to be the Ringbearer for the first time, featuring versions of Galadriel, Boromir, Smeagol and others who could bear the One Ring instead. More alternative Ringbearers would be added in later sets.
10. Mount Doom (July 14, 2004) - The final set of the "movie" release era introduced new powerful versions of several characters such as Éowyn, Arwen and Sam that would remain the preferred choices for many of the deck strategies.
11. Shadows (November 3, 2004) - The release of the new "base set" saw the most significant overhaul of the game, which would remain to be seen unfavorably by many players. Existing faction-based Shadow cultures of [Dunland], [Isengard], [Moria], [Raiders] and [Sauron] were replaced with more generic [Orcs], [Uruk-Hai] and [Evil Men], leaving only [Ringwraith] and [Gollum] unchanged and making the majority of the old cards incompatible with the new cultures. Companions other than the Ring-Bearer now also had Resistance, which was affected by both Free People and Shadow cards. Most importantly, instead of a numbered site path based on an individual movie, the nine sites from all three films could now be played in any order and replaced continuously by both Free People and Shadow cards. While this allowed for new gameplay strategies, many felt that the core aspect of the game no longer made sense story-wise.
12. Black Rider (March 18, 2005) - The first post-"Shadows" expansion was notable for reprinting many prominent cards from The Fellowship of the Ring block, which because of the recently introduced block rotation were no longer legal in the Standard tournament format.
13. Bloodlines (August 12, 2005) - This set introduced the new Follower card type - minor characters who could provide their Aid to the Fellowship for a cost that must be paid each turn. It also included the only cards that could change their card type in the form of conditions that could turn into minions and back.
14. Expanded Middle-earth Deluxe Draft Box (February 17, 2006) - Similar to "Reflections", this 15-card set used artwork by Weta Workshop to represent characters from the books not included in the films, such as Halbarad, Grimbeorn and Dáin Ironfoot.
15. The Hunters (June 9, 2006) - Released after a significant delay due to the financial problems experienced by Decipher, Inc., this new base set introduced a new powerful keyword Hunter and doubled the amount of available Followers.
16. The Wraith Collection (August 26, 2006) - This Deluxe set had only six cards and consisted entirely of Minions of the [Ringwraith] culture, half of whom used artwork by Weta Workshop to represent the Barrow-wights.
17. Rise of Saruman (March 1, 2007) - Released after another long delay, this set featured the only Free People character to be represented by more than one culture by introducing the [Rohan] version of Aragorn. It also contained no less than five different versions of Saruman, one for each culture, including the only Shadow follower in the game.
18. Treachery and Deceit (May 2007) - Rushed to release before the impending expiration of the license, this set suffered from a lack of playtesting and contained the largest number of overpowered or "broken" cards, for which official errata had to be released almost immediately. This set also received the smallest printing of all and remains incredibly hard to find in circulation.
19. Age's End (June 2007) - Released mere weeks before Decipher's license expired, this final "farewell" set consisted of 40 Promo-rarity cards available in a single Deluxe box. It featured the final versions of many prominent characters, some of which have been noted to be more powerful than any of those that came before.

In addition, a number of boutique products have been released:

- Oversized Cards (August 2001 - Summer 2003)
- Promotional Cards (Spring 2002 - Summer 2007)
- The Fellowship of the Ring Anthology (July 23, 2003)
- The Two Towers Anthology (February 25, 2004)
- The Return of the King Anthology (September 2004)
- The War of the Ring Anthology (September 2005)

The seven-month delay of The Hunters expansion release (from November 2005 to June 2006) made the game suffer a significant drop in popularity amongst its players as well as eventually force Decipher Inc. to remove the expansions The Great Eye and Shelob's Lair from its intended expansion since Decipher's license for Lord of the Rings related material was scheduled to expire on June 30, 2007. Following the release of the final expansion Age's End in June 2007 the game was discontinued and Decipher was forced to stop all production, distribution, and advertising.

== Deck strategies ==
As the game expanded beyond the first base set, several basic deck strategies were identified and developed. As decks are separated into Shadow and Free People sides, the two sides are to some extent interchangeable, but the best decks usually contain some synergy between both types of cards. Later sets have introduced multiple additional keywords and mechanics and greatly increased the pool of available cards, massively expanding the possibilities for unique strategies, often depending on a specific card.

For the Free Peoples side, the common basic strategies are tank, choke, minion wounding and mass healing.

Tank
Tank decks try to play as many companions as possible to combat the opponent's Shadow side with force.
Choke
Choke decks, the opposite of tank decks, try to put out as little twilight as possible, denying the opponent resources to play their minions, and clogging their hand with unplayable Shadow cards, thus hampering the set up of their Fellowship.
Archery/Wounding
Minion wounding decks try to use "archery fire" and direct wounding to destroy the minions before they even have a chance to attack.
Mass Healing
Mass healing decks rely on the cards that heal companions, with the expectation that if the Free People's removal of wounds can out-pace the Shadow player's placement of wounds, the Fellowship will be unkillable.

For the Shadow side, the common basic strategies are beat-down, swarm, bomb, companion wounding and corruption.

Beat-down
Beat down decks focus on making one or two minions very powerful with big damage bonuses, with the intention of killing all of the companions one by one; eventually killing the ring-bearer.
Swarm
Swarm decks have an opposite strategy of a beat-down: their goal is to play as many minions as possible as cheaply as possible. While one swarm minion might not be very powerful by itself, each minion is very cheap which allows many to be played, easily outnumbering the companions and assigning themselves to the Ring-bearer.
Bomb
A bomb deck combines the strategies of both beat-down decks and swarm decks. Instead of focusing on one or two powerful minions, they play several minions of medium strength. The goal of a bomb deck is to destroy the weaker companions, and then swarm the Free Peoples player.
Archery/Wounding
Archery and wounding decks rely on wounding companions outside of the skirmish so much that they die from their wounds. A variation of this strategy focuses on wounding the ring-bearer and killing him.
Corruption
Corruption decks focus on adding enough burdens to corrupt the ring-bearer, or playing cards that require certain conditions to be met to corrupt the ring-bearer outright.

Discard
Used by both Free People and Shadow sides, discard decks focus on discarding cards from either your opponent's hand or their draw deck, disrupting their strategy and eventually leaving them with no cards to oppose you in later turns.

== Lord of the Rings Online TCG ==
In 2003 Worlds Apart partnered with Decipher to produce an online version of the Lord of the Rings TCG. The online game's rules matched the physical game's rules, but utilized tradeable virtual cards that could be purchased through the system via starter decks, booster packs, or in draft. In addition to casual play, the online LOTR TCG system supported tournament play, league play, and sealed play including draft. The online system introduced a number of cards and formats that were online-only (for example, King-block draft packs), and offered players exclusive physical promotional cards and online avatars and movement tokens for participating in online events. The LOTR Online TCG software included collection management and robust deckbuilding features. For this reason alone many players have used the software to construct decks and print decklists.

In 2005 Sony Online Entertainment (SOE) bought Worlds Apart, but continued to support LOTR Online TCG. On May 22, 2007 SOE-Decipher announced the closure of all support for the Online gaming system. The LOTR Online TCG software was available and the SOE servers ran until June 30, 2010 when they were shut down for good, though no new cards could be purchased after May 2007.

Though not sanctioned or approved by Decipher, various alternate ways to play the game online have at various points been developed by players.

== Pro tour events ==
In July 2002, the first pro tour event was held at Origins Game Fair in Columbus, Ohio and it was won by John Lolli. 212 players participated in the event, and first place was $2,500. Christopher Schaut finished in 2nd place winning $1,000. Lolli used a unique deck designed to pass the ring from Frodo to Sam, and deny twilight to its opponent. Almost all of the top players were using later banned card called The Mirror of Galadriel, and Lolli used that strategy against his opponents designing a Minion half of the deck to counteract it.

== Organized play ==
Former World Champions include:
Year	Champion	Runner up
2002	Mathieu Brochu	Alex Tennet
2003	Michael Dalton	Robert Schiermeyer
2004	Emir Delic	Josh Cornwell-Mott
2005	Kyle George	Lee Clarke
2006	Christian Kriesel	Seth Maser
2007	Vince Accetturo & Chris Thompson	
2010	Brian Fred	Casey Anis
2023	basmelis	thefaker

=== 2007 World Championship controversy ===
There has been much debate as to the legitimacy of the 2007 World Champions (Vince Accetturo & Chris Thompson). Since the rights to produce the Lord of the Rings TCG was not renewed by Decipher, there was no legal way for the company to promote a World Championship, but they did still hold an unofficial event where the 2007 World Champions were crowned. The event was still held in Indianapolis, IN at GenCon on Friday, August 17, 2007 at 11:00 AM. The field was bested by Vince Accetturo and Chris Thompson, both members of the player group Team Bison Bucks. They decided to split the championship in the finals.

=== 2010 World Championship ===
With no official governing body for the game existing for years after 2007, no official World Championships could be held. No group stepped up to attempt an unofficial World Championship event until 2010 when the Star Wars CCG Players Committee decided to run a de facto World Championship for Lord of the Rings at their annual Worlds Weekend event. Brian Fred was crowned champion as the only undefeated player at the event, in which close to 20 players participated.

=== 2023 World Championship ===
With the establishment of the Player's Council in 2020 (see below), an organization finally existed that could claim the right to once again crown a World Champion. In 2023 the first all-digital World Championship was held on the Gemp platform over weekends in October of that year. 30 players competed worldwide, ultimately leading to basmelis being declared the World Champion, with the runner-up thefaker being dubbed the World Challenger.

== The Player's Council ==
On May 22, 2007, Decipher announced that the game's official lifetime would be expiring later that year, with no further product to be produced or sold after the end of June 2007. Fans were eager to establish a "Players Committee" to continue managing the game (which would mirror the official group established for the Star Wars CCG or the unofficial one made by fans for the Star Trek CCG), but that conflict over whether to pursue an "official" or "unofficial" avenue stymied every attempt to organize for many years.

The mass quarantines during the COVID-19 pandemic resulted in a resurgence of interest in the game (as it did for many others during that time), and riding that wave a group in the "unofficial" camp finally overcame the historical friction and organized under the name of the "Player's Council" in 2020. The PC quickly subsumed the various scattered community websites dedicated to the LOTR-TCG, and took on the upkeep and maintenance of the card database, the dedicated wiki, and other tools and platforms.

In 2023, the PC ran the first World Championship in 13 years on the digital platform Gemp, crowning basmelis as the new World Champion.

== Reception ==
The Wargamer wrote: "The Lord of the Rings Trading Card Game manages to thread the very thin needle of staying true to the spirit of the story and offering an excellent game. Decipher's design team has made the right choices to make this both an enjoyable two-person match and an excellent multiplayer game."

== See also ==
- The Lord of the Rings: The Card Game (LCG)
