= Bastian Winkelhaus =

Bastian Winkelhaus is a German Star Wars Customizable Card Game player. He was the first 3-time world champion, and the first person to win the championship in consecutive years. He is best known for winning the 2001 SWCCG world championship at FreedomCon. The following year, he made the top eight at the world championships again. After a long hiatus from competitive play, Winkelhaus returned and won back-to-back world championships in 2018 and 2019. He is also a multiple SWCCG European champion and a Team Tournament champion alongside Justin Branch.

Winkelhaus has also won the European Continental Championships four times. He was one of the three SWCCG players elected to the Decipher, Inc. Hall of Fame in 2002.

He also received Jedi Training with the Death Squadron of Duisburg (Reiner Zetsche, Ingo S., Lars M., Oliver S.) in 1997.

== See also ==
- Star Wars Customizable Card Game
