= The Watersdown Affair =

How to Host a Murder: The Watersdown Affair is a murder mystery party game published by Decipher in 1985.

== Gameplay ==
The Watersdown Affair is a mystery game in the "How to Host a Murder" series. This mystery is set in England in 1936 at the country estate of Sir Roger Watersdown. Eight players take on roles of various socialites who were all invited to spend the weekend at Watersdown Mansion. The host for the party is given suggestions about what food to serve, special invitations for their guests, and suggestions for genre appropriate costumes.

After roles have been handed out or decided upon, each player receives a booklet of information about who they are, with private information that needs only to be revealed if directly questioned about it.

To start the game, players reveal who they are playing. Then a cassette tape is played where a Scotland Yard inspector announces that Sir Roger has been murdered. The inspector goes on to give many details, as well as the layout of the mansion. Players are able to look at a blueprint of the mansion and a detailed Scotland Yard report.

The game then takes the form of four rounds, where players question each other. In between rounds, players read further private information about their character, and various clues are revealed, such as Sir Roger's will.

At the end of the fourth round, players make a final guess as to which guest is the murderer before the solution is revealed.

== Contents ==
The boxed set contains an instruction booklet for the host, booklets for each of the guests, a cassette tape, 8 invitations and envelopes, 6 sealed clue packages, name tags, and a list of suggested dinner menu items and appropriate costumes.

== Publication history ==
In 1983, Warren Holand founded Decipher to produce jigsaw puzzles. Two years later Decipher came out with a new party game concept, How to Host a Murder, where a host invites eight guests to take on the roles of guests cum investigators as part of a dinner party. The first one was How to Host a Murder: The Watersdown Affair, designed by Robert and Anne Johnson, with artwork by Gary Kelley. Over the next 20 years, Decipher would publish 16 more of these murder mystery packages.

== Reception ==
In Issue 76 of Space Gamer, Creede Lambard was highly impressed, saying, "And the verdict? I cannot recommend this game highly enough. If your dinner parties are becoming a bit dull, or if you and seven or more of your friends want to have a great time one evening, buy The Watersdown Affair."

In Issue 71 of Games, Wayne Schmittberger questioned whether the players had a reasonable chance of solving the mystery, saying, "The mystery is cleverly constructed — perhaps too cleverly." But he concluded, "The Watersdown Affair will definitely provide a diverting and atmospheric evening, but players should not be surprised if they are unable to solve the puzzle."

In the book Romantic antics: Creative ideas for successful first dates, adventurous Saturday nights, and playful long weekends, Kevin Decker recommended The Watersdown Affair for a "fun and romantic evening." Decker related how the evening went and concluded, "Nobody guessed right, but it was still a lot of fun."

== Reviews ==
- Game News #10 (Dec., 1985)
