= Fight Klub =

Collectible card game

- Designers: Tim Ellington
- Publishers: Decipher, Inc.
- Players: 2+
- Setup time: < 2 min.
- Playing time: approx 15 min.
- Chance: Some
- Age range: 16/18+
- Skills: Card playing Arithmetic; Reading

Fight Klub is an out-of-print trading card game by Decipher, Inc. The first two sets were released February 16, 2009 and shipped to the players on February 26, 2009. The third set was released on January 11, 2010.

In May 2008, Decipher, Inc. selected individuals to become part of their Founding Member and Connector Program for Fight Klub. There were 2,900 Founding Mentors originally selected. On June 7, 2008, Founding Mentors received Fight Klub TCG rules version 0.9 to provide feedback on. Decipher Players Advocate Kendrick Summers, elected three Founding Members, Matt Lussier (MentalExodus), (MasterYodaaa), and (KankyWompous) to oversee the initial voting, discussion, and culling process of the gang names from 60 to 13. In September 2009, Warren Holland, Decipher, Inc. CEO, announced the first Fight Klub TCG Newsletter called "The Drop" which would be available on Decipher, Inc. website in PDF format. On January 6, 2010, Warren Holland, Decipher, Inc. CEO announced changes to the Founding Mentor program. Founding Mentors would only retain their active status if they (1) purchased at least one Kilo in the past six months, (2) selected a Gang affiliation, and (3) updated their personal greeting in "Your Account - Mentor settings." Secondly, a new class of member called a Player Advocate was created. Decipher, Inc. had released a Rare puzzle card for Fight Klub TCG and the player who solved the puzzle would be awarded 9 Kilo's of Fight Klub. On January 6, 2011, the puzzle card, Decipher This, was solved by Josh (Sogfrog).

Every set of the game features six playable characters and additional artwork from a variety of licensed properties, such as movies and TV shows. Sets One and Two contain Mr. Blonde of Reservoir Dogs, John Rambo, Ash from Evil Dead, Dr. Hannibal Lecter, Sil from Species and Tank Girl among other heroes and villains. Set Three features characters from the Terminator series, RoboCop, Platoon, Jeepers Creepers, and Fargo.

== Distribution ==
The distribution of Fight Klub differs from traditional trading card games in several ways. Fight Klub is sold directly to the players through the official Decipher website, or alternatively through retailer who have purchased bulk retail packs to offer to players. Furthermore, Fight Klub is not sold in the usual booster and starter set packaging but in 121 card boxes called Kilos. The price of a Kilo is $29.95 plus $4.95 for worldwide shipping, payable with credit cards and – in the future – via PayPal as well.

The premier set One builds the foundation of the game a will be available throughout the game's lifecycle. Additionally it is the only set which comes with a fixed card distribution and also includes approx. 21 →glass bead tokens to count energy. The simultaneously released set Two and any following set are randomized. Also every set, starting with Two features a Black Beauty bonus—a gift to those who purchase at least three Kilos of that set. Black Beauty 2 contains three rare gameplay cards, and eight "viral marketing cards."

There is some concern that this distribution model will alienate game stores, which currently serve as focal points for local tournaments and play groups for TCGs. However, there is the option for retailers to become "connectors", allowing them to earn a percentage of profits from the players signed up through their location. Also, game stores have the option to purchase bulk retail packs of kilos at about a 50% cost reduction to sell in their game stores.

== Marketing ==
Decipher is working to market Fight Klub by encouraging grassroots and viral marketing activity. New players are associated with an existing mentor or player advocate to introduce them to the game. Invitations are no longer needed to join. The website was opened to the public on February 20, 2009.

== Gameplay ==
The full rules and a demo deck are available on the official Fight Klub website. In Fight Klub every player controls a single character, either a hero or a villain, selected from a variety of licensed films and television shows. The goal of the game is to incur damage points to the opposing character equal to his life points. Every character has access to three energy colors—Green, Blue, and Yellow. Although the colors have different meanings for each character, they represent similar concepts and are meant get players to use cards that fit the general feel of their chosen character. This energy is used to play additional cards or activate effects. Cards require the player to Burn (spend) or Spot (just have) a certain amount and color of energy. – New gameplay mechanics introduced in THREE include Partners, Destiny (reveal the top card of your fight stack and take an action based on its Destiny number), and Dom1nate (you win a skirmish if you have the same skirmish type as your opponent).

=== Deck building and card types ===
Every deck consists of exactly 40 cards: One Character card, 12 Fight Cards, 24–26 Draw Deck cards and The Drop. The fight cards and the support cards each form separate piles. The character and the drop start in play (along with other potential Universal cards and Partner cards). A deck may contain one copy of any rare card and three copies of any uncommon or common card. Additionally some cards have a gold icon. A deck may contain only three such cards in total.

- Character – Each character card has a specific number of Life points, restrictions to hand size (marked as Hold and Hand), and energy tokens, as well as unique game text of some sort.
- Fight Card – Most fight cards possess three Skirmish tabs along the top and a damage marker at the bottom. Skirmishes are resolved by comparing the skirmish value of the tab with the value of the opposing tab. Some fight cards provide alternate game text to resolve the fight. Skirmishes also have a certain type and various cards can give bonuses to specific skirmish types.
- Support Cards
  - Condition – These cards represent persistent changes to the fight like allied characters and provide effects that can be used in the appropriate steps.
  - Gear – Tools, weapons and armor offer persistent enhancements to a character until they are destroyed in a fight.
  - Effect – These cards provide additional power to fight cards but are destroyed after use.
  - Instant – Immediate one time effects playable during various steps.
- The Drop – Mainly indicates who controls the order of actions but has other gameplay implications as well.
- Partner – A Partner card starts the game in play and are associated with a specific character card. They may step in to fight for the main character, use their Hand and Hold values instead of the main character, and use their gametext through the game.

=== Turn phases and steps ===
Unlike games such as Magic: The Gathering or Star Wars Customizable Card Game where players alternate taking full turns, in Fight Klub, players alternate play during each phase of a turn. The player in possession of the special card called The Drop determines in every step which player can execute his actions first. The possession of The Drop also alternates after every turn.

1. Setup Phase
  1. Players receive energy tokens according to their character.
  2. Players may play two setup actions such as playing gear or weapon cards
  3. Players take three cards from the top of their fight stack and place them face down in front of them, aligning them to the cards of their opponents
2. Fight Phase – Players flip the fight cards face up and the player with the drop decided in which order the fights are resolved. The following explains the resolution of one fight.
  1. Players may play one Enhance action which usually improves the power of the current fight card.
  2. The player with the drop then decides in which order the three skirmishes of that fight are resolved.
  3. Players may then play on Score action. After this the winning fight card is scored, incurring damage on the losing character.
3. Cooldown Phase
  1. Players may play one Cooldown action
  2. Players discard hand cards down to equal or less their Hold value and draw up to their Hand value.
  3. Possession of the drop alternates between the players and the next turn starts.

== Gangs ==
Fight Klub players will be able to join one of 13 Gangs representing different ethos. The Gang Names were selected by votes of the Founding Mentors from a list of 60 semifinalists. Each Gang would have a Leader represented by a player. That player had additional admin capabilities including a Gang specific blog to communicate news and match results related to that specific Gang's players.

The Gangs are:

- Gunslingers
- The Brotherhood
- The Forgotten
- Zero Order
- Society of Shadows
- Wild Cards
- The Faceless
- Dark Lotus
- Schrödinger's Cats
- The Enlightened
- Dead Man's Hand
- Dark Carnival
- The Hidden
