= Star Trek Customizable Card Game =

Collectible card game

Star Trek Customizable Card Game (1st Edition)
- Card back for Star Trek Customizable Card Game
- Designers: Tom Braunlich, Rollie Tesh, Evan Lorentz, and Bill Martinson
- Publishers: Decipher, Inc.
- Players: 2
- Setup time: 15 minutes
- Playing time: 1 hour
- Chance: Low
- Skills: Deck optimization, Planning, Strategy
- World Champion (2023): Peter Ludwig

Star Trek Customizable Card Game (2nd Edition)
- Designers: Evan Lorentz and Brad Defruiter
- Publishers: Decipher, Inc.
- Players: 2+
- Setup time: < 1 minute
- Playing time: 1 hour
- Chance: Medium
- Skills: Deck optimization, Planning, Strategy

The Star Trek Customizable Card Game is an out-of-print collectible card game based on the Star Trek universe. The name is commonly abbreviated as STCCG or ST:CCG. It was first introduced in 1994 by Decipher, Inc., under the name Star Trek: The Next Generation Customizable Card Game. The game now has two distinct editions, though both forms of the game have many common elements.

== Standard elements ==
The standard central goal for a player of STCCG is to obtain 100 points, primarily by completing missions or objectives. This is done by bringing personnel, ships and equipment into play, then moving an attempting team to a mission. Once a mission attempt starts, the personnel will create away teams to encounter dilemmas which will challenge them in some way. Often if the personnel have the required skills or attributes they can overcome certain dilemmas' effects. Once the required dilemmas are passed, the personnel still active in the attempt must have the skills and/or attribute totals required by the mission to solve it. If the mission is solved, the player earns the printed points.

Other aspects of the game increase player interactions: ships and personnel can battle, or otherwise affect each other; cards like events and interrupts can alter the environment for one or more players; and points can be scored using methods other than mission solving.

One of the most attractive themes of the game is affiliations. These are groupings of ships and personnel based on the major interstellar powers of the Star Trek universe, and decks will be based around one, or perhaps more, of these groups.

== First Edition ==
What is now known as First Edition (commonly abbreviated "1E" among players) is the original conception of the game, through various designers and iterations. It was first licensed only to cover Star Trek: The Next Generation, and the first three card sets were limited to that show's universe. As such, the only affiliations created were the Federation, Klingons, and Romulans, plus a group for other cards that didn't fit into the three main affiliations called Non-Aligned. This narrow scope had little attraction for players, and it was felt that only five more sets could be released before running the full course of available material.

In 1997, Decipher announced that a wider scope had now been licensed for the game: Deep Space Nine, Voyager and The Next Generation movies would soon be depicted in new cards, thus the game's name was shortened to the existing title. The First Contact set arrived late that year, based on the film Star Trek: First Contact; that set introduced the Borg affiliation, among other new concepts.

This was soon followed by several sets based on situations in Deep Space Nine; these introduced affiliations for the Bajorans, Cardassians, Dominion, and Ferengi, along with enhanced systems for battling and capturing. The era of these expansions is considered by many players to be the 'golden age' of First Edition.

Two more sets featuring Original Series cards came next (when that property was added to the license), followed by sets drawing heavily on Voyager which introduced the new, but smaller Kazon, Vidiian, and Hirogen affiliations. It was after this that the game began a serious decline in popularity and sales.

Sales faltered during the release of the last two sets, based on the films and on holodeck scenarios. This dip in sales resulted in Decipher taking a serious look at the game's future.

=== Releases ===
Full expansions are listed in regular type, boutique/special cards in italics

1E Premiere (release: November, 1994) The first edition premiere set contained 363 cards (121 each of rare, uncommon, and common) and introduced the affiliations of the Federation, the Klingons, and the Romulans, along with Non-Aligned cards. It was available in randomized 60-card starter boxes (generally not playable right out of the box, with 2 rares, 13 uncommons, and 45 commons) and 15-card expansion packs (1 rare, 3 uncommons, and 11 commons). The initial 'limited edition' print run had a black border and the following 'unlimited edition' runs (December 1994 and 1995) had a white border, making the black-bordered cards rarer, even though that color would become the staple of all later sets. In fact, all printings after the first were planned to be white-bordered, but no more printings were made. The Limited Edition print run of 45.9 million cards consisted of 19,339 of each rare card, 78,843 of each uncommon card, and 281,157 of each common card. The white-bordered edition print run was 162 million cards. Both were printed by Carta Mundi in Belgium.

Data Laughing (release: 1995) A promotional card that had ties to the first three sets. It was originally available as a mail-in redemption included in the Official Player's Guide published by Brady Games. The card was later included in the Introductory 2-Player Game.

Warp Pack (release: August, 1995) The Warp Pack was a selection of 12 white-bordered common cards to help make decks playable out of the box. Two of the cards that had not been seen before would be released in the next set, Alternate Universe. The packs were available for free from the Decipher website.

Alternate Universe (release: December, 1995) Alternate Universe was a collection of 122 cards that focused on cards from the past, future, and alternate timelines. It also contained the first ultra-rare card, the Future Enterprise. It sold in 15-card expansion packs. The expansion marked the point where tournament play was sponsored by Decipher, Inc.

Collector's Tin (release: November, 1995) This collector's item had a limited run of 30000 units and contained one of each of the premiere set's 363 cards with a silver border.

Q Continuum (release: October, 1996) The next expansion, Q Continuum was another standard set of 121 cards and introduced the Q Continuum and the "Q-Flash" side deck to the game. An important mechanic introduced in this expansion was the "Q's Tent" sideboard.

Introductory 2-Player Game (release: January, 1997) This set contained two separate pre-constructed 60-card decks, one Federation and one Klingon, both of which are white bordered. Each edition included the same three premium cards (a black-bordered Admiral McCoy and Data Laughing and a white-bordered Spock) and 11 new white-bordered mission cards. Edition #1 (in a blue box) contained a set of three new black-bordered premium Federation cards and Edition #2 (in a red box) contained a set of three new black-bordered premium Klingon cards.

First Anthology (release: June, 1997) The First Anthology (a concept that would return twice more) included six premium cards that would all later be featured in upcoming sets and was the first to feature cards that were not exclusive to The Next Generation. The box also contained two white bordered Premiere 60-card starter sets, two 15-card packs of white-bordered Premiere, two 15-card packs each of Alternate Universe and Q Continuum, and the Warp Pack.

The Fajo Collection (release: December, 1997) This special collection contained 18 super-rare cards and had a print run of 40,000. Each set contains a presentation binder, a signed certificate of authenticity, a Fajo Collection rules document, a collectible art poster showcasing the entire Star Trek CCG universe at that time, a business card featured on one of the cards, and a stick of gum associated with another. The cards were available from a Decipher subsidiary, the Eccentric Order, and were promised not to be reprinted in order to retain their value. The collection introduced the concept of a "set icon" printed on every card in that set that would continue until the end of 1E. Because of the low print runs, Decipher was able to include some special features on the cards, including metallic ink, UV-light sensitive ink, better color saturation, artwork bleeding onto the card border, and even a card (Qapla'!) printed entirely in Klingon (the design for which is markedly different from every other card in the game).

First Contact (release: December, 1997) This set of 130 cards focused entirely on the movie Star Trek: First Contact, greatly changed gameplay and added the first new affiliation in the Borg. It was available in 9-card booster packs, greatly reducing the number of repeat common cards.

Away Team Pack (release: May, 1998) This pack contains two cards featuring The Traveler (from the episode "Where No One Has Gone Before" and The Emissary (Benjamin Sisko's role in the Bajoran religion). The cards were designed to honor Decipher's Star Trek CCG product managers Marcus Certa (The Emissary) and Kyle Heuer (The Traveler), who functioned as traveling game evangelists using those pseudonyms. The packs were made available as an insert in an issue of Scrye magazine and were also handed out by the traveling evangelists themselves.

Official Tournament Sealed Deck (OTSD) (release: May, 1998) The Official Tournament Sealed Decks contain the same fixed deck of twenty new cards, designed to allow any other cards to be able to work together in a sealed format. Also included in each set were four white-bordered Premiere expansion packs and one Alternate Universe expansion pack. There were six different box designs (each representing an affiliation: Bajoran, Borg, Cardassian, Federation, Klingon, and Romulan).

Deep Space Nine (release: July, 1998) This set of 276 cards introduced the characters, aliens, and more from Deep Space Nine as well as two new affiliations: the Bajorans and the Cardassians. The USS Defiant was a special "twice as rare" white-bordered preview card. The set was available in 60-card starter decks and 9-card expansion packs.

Starter Deck II (release: December, 1998) This set attempted to solve again the problems of playing the game straight from the box by including a 60-card Premiere starter deck along with eight new cards designed to allow the cards in the starter to work together. A collaboration with Activision included a giveaway of a Starter Deck II with the pre-order of Star Trek: Hidden Evil.

Enhanced First Contact (release: January, 1999) The Enhanced First Contact boxes consisted of four packs of the First Contact expansion packaged with three new cards and one transparent Borg assimilation overlay. There were four different assortments of the new cards, and each group of three would always occur together in the same package, along with the same transparent Borg overlay. A cutout on the back of the box allowed buyers to know which new cards they were buying.

The Dominion (release: January, 1999) This set of 130 cards introduced the Dominion affiliation. It also included four special white-bordered preview cards that would all be reprinted in subsequent expansions. It was sold in 9-card expansion packs.

Blaze of Glory (release: August, 1999) Blaze of Glory was a 130-card expansion that enhanced the battling mechanic that had remained unchanged since the beginning of the game. It also featured an 18-card foil subset - the first in any Star Trek CCG expansion. It was sold in 9-card expansion packs. Many players point to this expansion as the high point of the game.

Rules of Acquisition (release: December, 1999) This 130-card set introduced the Ferengi and their rules. It was sold in 9-card expansion packs.

U.S.S. Jupiter (release: 2000) This card was inserted into the PC game Star Trek: Armada by Activision as a promotional tie-in.

Second Anthology (release: March, 2000) The Second Anthology included six premium cards that would not be featured in upcoming sets. The box also contained two Starter Deck IIs, two First Contact expansion packs, two Deep Space Nine expansion packs, and two Dominion expansion packs.

The Trouble with Tribbles (release: July, 2000) This 141-card set introduces the Original Series and the "tribbles" side deck. The Original Series became a property of Decipher when SkyBox International lost its license and was premiered in this set. Special features include preconstructed starter decks with premium cards in each and the return of ultra-rare cards inserted into packs (there would be an ultra-rare in each expansion from that point forward). This expansion featured Dr. McCoy as its ultra-rare as a tribute to DeForest Kelley, who had died the previous year. Cards also began to list collector's information (card number and rarity) in the lower right corner. The expansion was sold in two preconstructed 60-card starter decks (one Federation, one Klingon) and 11-card expansion packs.

Tribbles customizable card game box

Tribbles (release: October, 2000) is non-collectible customizable card game. It is a subgame of the Trouble with Tribbles expansion and was a customizable card game. While this game is not playable with most cards from the customizable card game, this pre-constructed game could be expanded by collecting the tribbles cards from The Troubles with Tribbles expansion of the Star Trek CCG.

Reflections: The First Five Year Mission (release: November, 2000) This set consisted of 18-card packs that contained 17 random cards (from Premiere, Alternative Universe, Q Continuum, First Contact, The Dominion, and Deep Space Nine) and a special foil card. 105 of the best rare cards available were reproduced as foil versions; 100 were presented in the packs. Reflections also introduced "topper" cards. Four of these premium foil cards appeared randomly, one per display, on top of the packs inside the 30-pack display box. In addition, a case of display boxes was topped with a final Seven of Nine foil.

Enhanced Premiere (release: November, 2000) Six different Enhanced Premiere packages were available. Each contained four packs of white bordered Premiere and five new premium cards. There were a total of twenty-one new premium cards: twelve were fixed and nine were randomized. Nine were the second versions of missions that had originally appeared in the Premiere set. The cards were upgraded with new gameplay and either images of space stations found in Activision's video game Star Trek: Armada (as another cross-promotional tie) or wormholes (to help make the "Wormhole" card easier to use in the sealed environment). This set also introduced the Warp Speed format for quicker games and drafting capabilities. As with Enhanced First Contact, the product boxes had a cutout on the back so buyers knew which set of fixed cards they had selected.

Mirror, Mirror (release: December, 2000) This 131-card set introduced the Mirror Universe. This expansion's ultra-rare was Mirror Universe First Officer Spock. It was sold in 11-card expansion packs.

Voyager (release: May 23, 2001) This 201-card set introduced the Delta Quadrant faction of Voyager and her crew as well as the Kazon and Vidiian affiliations. This expansion's ultra-rare was The Pendari Champion (a character played by Dwayne "The Rock" Johnson in a WWF Smackdown! (now WWE Smackdown!) cross-promotion). The expansion was sold in 40-card starter decks (some of which were drawn from a set of 20 starter-only cards) and 11-card expansion packs. This set also introduced the Voyager-only environment for sanctioned gameplay. Starting with this expansion, dual-affiliation cards were printed with both color borders (with equal rarity).

The Borg (release: September 19, 2001) The Borg continued the introduction of the Delta Quadrant with 131 cards that introduced the Borg again and added the Hirogen affiliation. The expansion's ultra-rare was a Voyager-era Reginald Barclay. The expansion was sold in 11-card expansion packs.

Holodeck Adventures (release: December 21, 2001) Holodeck Adventures was a 131-card set that expanded on the holographic characters that had been available since the Premiere set. The expansion's ultra-rare was Jean-Luc Picard as Dixon Hill. The expansion was sold in 11-card expansion packs. The name of the set was originally going to be given to the fourth full set before the original license was expanded, and the set was designed with that nostalgia in mind, as it had links to Q Continuum.

Tournament / Redemption Foils (release: January 2001 – August 2002) A set of 18 foils of popular common and uncommon cards were provided by Decipher as prizes for sanctioned tournaments. Each card was available for two months. There were also seven additional foils provided as prizes for special tournaments, as incentives for retailer promotions, or given to attendees of DecipherCon in October 2000.

The Motion Pictures (release: April 17, 2001) The 131 cards in The Motion Pictures featured all nine of the Star Trek movies available at the time and the Voyager episode "Flashback", which ties into Star Trek VI: the Undiscovered Country. The expansion's ultra-rare was a 24th-century James T. Kirk. The expansion was sold in 11-card expansion packs. This was also the last set released before the announcement of the end of the game and the move to 2E.

All Good Things (release: July 9, 2003) All Good Things featured 41 new cards that provided new gameplay and mended the so-called "broken links" in the first edition – cards that were referenced directly or indirectly on other cards but had not yet been released. The "anthology-style" collector's box included ten Reflections expansion packs, a Starter Deck II, the USS Jupiter premium card, and a comprehensive card list. The name of the set comes from the last episode of The Next Generation and had been the proposed name for the fifth and final expansion before the license was expanded.

Enterprise Collection (release: July 7, 2006) With the inclusion of Star Trek: Enterprise in 2E, it was felt that 1E players should be able to have the tools necessary to play as the Enterprise-era "Starfleet" affiliation as well. This set of 18 foiled cards (and a supply of First Edition compatible cards from 2E) was intended to make that possible. The cards were sold exclusively from Decipher's website.

Genesis (release: November 13, 2006) Genesis was a 27-card expansion that has the distinction of being the only completely First Edition compatible set in 2E. Each card was designed to work in both versions of the game, with varying degrees of success. The cards were sold exclusively from Decipher's website.

=== Critical reception to First Edition ===
In the June 1995 edition of Dragon (Issue 218), Rick Swan admired the high production quality of the cards, and the fact that "a typical starter deck provides a good mix of all categories." Swan not only admired the streamlined game system, but also "its remarkable simulation of the elements of a good SF adventure." He did question the internal logic of some of the scenarios; for example, "some of the Missions must be undertaken by specific affiliations – why can't the Federation assist with the fever outbreak on Nahmi IV and why can't the Romulans hunt for artifacts on Barradas III?" Swan also questioned the rule that opposing sides can use the same Personnel, leading to the potential situation where "Lt. Worf might have to battle himself." Swan also criticized combat, which was little more than "a comparison of weapons ratings and shield ratings, but not particularly dramatic." He also questioned why a ship is removed if it loses two battles in the same turn. But in the end, Swan felt these were minor quibbles, giving the game a top rating of 6 out of 6, while calling the game "ingenious, gorgeous and addictive."

A year later, in the June 1996 edition of Dragon (Issue 230), Swan revisited the game to review the Alternate Universe expansion, and found the game "remains a delight." He gave the expansion set a rating of 4 out of 6, saying, "Alternate Universe doesn't do much to expand the rules, but it serves as a good excuse to revisit a terrific product."

The reviewer from the online second volume of Pyramid stated that "I hoped Decipher would continue to find new and innovative ways to release and market cards for their games. The Fajo Collection for the Star Trek Game gave me my wish."

=== Reviews ===
- Syfy (The Borg Expansion)

=== First edition's problems ===
Some of Decipher's concerns included the complexity and bloat that the game had built over seven years; there was no balanced 'cost' system for cards, causing stopgap and complex systems to be added to the game over time. As well, the game had embraced many different and not fully compatible ideas over time; this made for long, corrective rules documents and a steep learning curve for beginners. In addition, the number of cards types went from nine to over seventeen in just a couple of years, which made the game much more difficult to learn.

=== Initial ideas ===
At first, the game designers sought to introduce an entire new game based on Star Trek; it would be simpler and be targeted to beginners, while the original game still produced expansions, but on a slower schedule. This concept was abandoned when the sales figures showed that the original game could not continue on its own merits.

== Second edition ==
The solution was to reinvent the original game along the basic lines, still allowing a depth of gameplay but avoiding complex rules and concepts. The standard card types and gameplay would remain, allowing some new cards to be used with the original cards, known as backward-compatible cards, or First Edition Compatible (abbreviated as 1EC) and attempting to satisfy longstanding fans of the original game. These cards are able to be used in First Edition gameplay, though some key words need to be changed to fit the First Edition's old rules and setup. Further information on how to use Second Edition cards in First Edition gameplay are listed in the First Edition Conversion Rules. Many cards central to the new form of the game can only conform to the new rules and setup. Second Edition, commonly abbreviated "2E", was launched in 2002, and came to a close with its final expansion in December, 2007.

Because the game was essentially starting from scratch with the hindsight of seven years' work, the initial Second Edition set was able to progress quickly. As a result, six affiliations debuted in that set compared to three for the original. It could be argued that the number was really seven, because of a unique new system that divided the Federation affiliation into groupings based on the shows' casts. The focus of the Second Edition sets has been on characters and situations in The Next Generation and Deep Space Nine, though 'supporting' cards have images and concepts drawn from every part of the canon Star Trek universe. Furthermore, the scope of each card type could be realized in the early planning and a permanent seven card types were created: "dilemmas", "equipment", "events", "interrupts", "missions", "personnel", and "ships". Decks would consist of five missions, at least twenty dilemmas in a dilemma pile (see below) and at least thirty-five cards made up of the other five card types.

=== Cost and resources ===
One major difference in Second Edition was the addition of a cost system to equipment, events, personnel, and ships. A card's cost is listed in the top left-hand corner of a card, directly preceding the card's title as a single digit number (currently anywhere from 0 to 9). A player receives seven 'counters' at the beginning of each turn; to play a card, the player must spend a number of counters equal to the cost of the card. Only interrupts (of the card types in a player's deck) do not have a cost and are treated as 0-cost.

=== Dilemma pile ===
Another major change in the gameplay of Second Edition was the new method of handling dilemmas. Instead of using First Edition's lengthy procedure of a 'seed phase', which could last upwards of 15 minutes, Second Edition employs an 'on-the-fly' method for constructing dilemma combinations. Whereas a First Edition player was constrained to using the same dilemmas in each game of a tournament, the Second Edition player has a side deck, or 'dilemma pile' from which to draw a random selection of dilemmas based on the number of personnel the opponent uses in a given mission attempt. This concept is similar to First Edition's Q-Flash side deck, and also to a rules variant of First Edition introduced by a group of players from the San Francisco area called 'Trek 1.5'. This more dynamic method of selecting dilemmas is dependent on a player's ability to remember which personnel his/her opponent has played and their ability to satisfy a dilemma's requirements.

=== Gameplay considerations ===
While First Edition attempted to sometimes literally represent instances from the Star Trek universe in the game, Second Edition has focused more on a consistency of gameplay as a priority over design consideration with regard to remaining faithful to the source material. Effects on cards sometimes lack the "Trek sense" that First Edition cards contained and can be purely conceptual, but are generally much more equitable when compared with other similarly costed effects.

=== Affiliation uniqueness ===
The affiliations found in Second Edition all follow rules that give them focus and distinguish them from one another, unlike most of the affiliations in First Edition. Playing an affiliation in Second Edition feels more like that affiliation than First Edition, given the themes.

Bajorans are religious and think about how the past affects their lives. This gives them strengths in one of the game's three attributes: Integrity. They can also manipulate the discard pile (conceptually, what has passed on).

Borg are half-mechanical lifeforms that use their superior numbers to overcome resistance and even make an enemy into one of their mindless number. This is represented by a number of abilities that manipulate decks and ignore or otherwise force through dilemmas. They also are very effective in taking over another player's resources, including their personnel. They do not work with any other affiliation.

Cardassians are wasteful in their pursuits of resources and can make great use of political prisoners. This is shown in a variety of drawing mechanisms, which allow players to find cards they want faster at a cost of discarding others. Also, they are the best at holding an opponent's personnel for gain.

The Dominion are a hierarchal society that, as the name implies, dominates other societies. They are conceived in the game as a kind of anti-Federation (see below) and often hurt all players to further their goals. Their personnel are usually Jem'Hadar, who act as shock-troopers and are treated as disposable, Vorta, who act as commanders and diplomats, and Changelings, who are the overall leaders of the Dominion, are protected at all costs, and often use their shape-shifting abilities to infiltrate an opponent's personnel, often meddling with their progress.

The Federation focuses on cooperation and mutual advancement and work to better themselves. In gameplay, their effects often help all players, but planning for this allows a player to take a larger advantage than his or her opponent who does not have advance warning. Their personnel are often the best individuals in the game, but most effects cost a little more to achieve. Each reporting icon (see below) has other themes unique to their show.

The Ferengi are the greedy capitalist of the future, but are mostly weak in each of the attributes. This is achieved in the game by giving them bonuses in almost all areas simply by having more of some resource than an opponent. Also, they will hoard their resources by stacking cards beneath their headquarters mission, using those resources to great effect later.

Non-Aligned personnel are a catch-all affiliation for personnel that do not fit in one of the other affiliations.

Klingons are brutal, but honorable warriors. They can achieve their goals by fighting an opponent either ship to ship or personnel to personnel. The average Klingon has a high Strength, which is one of the three attributes used by the game.

Romulans prefer espionage and sneaky tactics as opposed to direct confrontation. This is realized in the game by manipulating another player's deck, hand, and other resources. Rarely do they affect cards already in play, but they can mess with an opponent's ongoing attempts to score points.

Starfleet is based on the pre-Federation days as depicted in Star Trek: Enterprise. The humans in this era are eager to get out into space and get bonuses for completing a space mission first. As a result, they can be slow to start, but then can easily make up time.

=== Reporting icons ===
One aspect of affiliation uniqueness that Second Edition has continued is specialized reporting icons. While not a new idea (First Edition's Mirror, Mirror set first featured Empire and Alliance icons for affiliated personnel and ships), Second Edition's widespread utilization of the icon as a cultural identifier has allowed designers to introduce support cards that better represent the various Trek shows' themes. This is the primary tool to divide the Federation affiliation into separate groups (The Original Series, The Next Generation, Deep Space Nine, and Voyager each have an icon representing their personnel and ships). Other likeminded groups can have these icons as well; the Maquis incorporate members of four different affiliations into their arsenal, while the Terok Nor personnel and ships represent the brief period of Cardassian/Dominion command of Deep Space Nine.

=== Releases ===
1. Second Edition (release: December 12, 2002) The 2E premier was a 415-card introduction into the new mechanics of the restarted game. It introduced the affiliations of the Bajorans, Cardassians, Federation (with Deep Space Nine, The Next Generation, and Earth factions), Klingons, Non-Aligned, and Romulan. The cards were sold in Deep Space Nine, Klingon, Romulan, and The Next Generation starter decks, which were pre-constructed to allow a player to have a playable deck right away, and in 11-card expansion packs.

2. Energize (release: May 21, 2003) Energize consisted of 180 cards intended to jumpstart the game from the premier. It introduced the Federation faction of the Maquis and expanded the core play of the game. The cards were sold in 11-card expansion packs.

3. Call to Arms (release: September 10, 2003) Call to Arms was a double-sized set at 208 cards. It introduced the affiliations of the Borg, Dominion, and the Ferengi (although the Ferengi consisted only of two cards that played with the Terok Nor faction of both the Cardassians and the Dominion; the full Ferengi affiliation would be released two years later in Strange New Worlds). The cards were sold in Borg and Dominion starter decks, which were pre-constructed to allow a player to have a playable deck right away, and in 11-card expansion packs.

4. Necessary Evil (release: March 17, 2004) Necessary Evil finally established the standard expansion size as 120 cards. Gameplay included personnel crossing affiliation lines and paying larger costs (including losing points and hurting future chances at stopping an opponent with dilemmas with a new keyword (Consume)) for bigger effects. This set also began a tradition of foiling a select eighteen rares and inserting them into one of every seven packs. The foil cards were further made important as 2004 was the 10th anniversary of Star Trek CCG, so a special Tenth Anniversary icon was added to the corner of these foils. The cards were sold in 11-card expansion packs. The set unfortunately suffered from a small print run and became a rare commodity. Efforts were made in Reflections 2.0 to offset this problem of unavailability.

0. Tenth Anniversary Collection (release: May 3, 2004) This set was a foiled promotional collection of eighteen unique ships and commanders. It was labeled with a set number of 0, which is otherwise associated with reprints of various cards with alternate images, as foils, and/or labeled with the promotion in place of the cards' otherwise descriptive, but non-gameplay related lore. The cards themselves were numbered 6 through 23, as five promotional cards had already been printed, and continued the declaration that all foils printed in 2004 would carry the Tenth Anniversary logo. This set, however, does include the last of the cards with that icon, even though Reflections 2.0 also had foil cards in 2004. The collection itself was later reprinted without the Tenth Anniversary logo and numbered 54 through 71. The cards were originally given away with a recommended $3.00 purchase of other Star Trek CCG products, one pair at a time, over a period of nine weeks. The reprints were available for purchase on the Decipher website.

5. Fractured Time (release: October 13, 2004) Fractured Time was a 40-card boutique product that introduced events that had an effect over time by use of a new keyword (Decay) and concepts involving alternate timelines, which the Star Trek universe has often called upon, including the first cards from the "Mirror Universe" that would eventually be revisited in three years with In a "Mirror, Darkly". The cards were sold as a complete set in boxes, complete with the icons of six different affiliations, designed to carry decks. The boxes also included a starter deck and some expansion packs from previous releases with the expectation that the game could be played right out of the box in a sealed tournament format.

6. Reflections 2.0 (release: December 8, 2004) Reflections 2.0 introduced 61 new foil cards to the game and 60 foil reprinted cards from 2E Premier, Energize, Call to Arms, and most importantly, Necessary Evil. The set featured cards that attempted to entice affiliations to try different missions, as mission selection among top decks had become fairly static. The cards were sold in 20-card expansion packs, which included two of the foiled cards and eighteen random cards from past expansions, including Necessary Evil.

7. Strange New Worlds (release: May 13, 2005) Strange New Worlds continued the standard expansion size of 120 cards. It introduced the full affiliation of the Ferengi. Gameplay included a personnel for each affiliation that further took advantage of alternate mission selection, like the personnel in Reflections 2.0. This set's eighteen-card foiled subset was the first to be called an archive foil subset and was numbered separately. In addition, two archive portrait cards were put in one out of every eighteen packs, featuring a larger picture area and restricted gameplay for upcoming cards. The archive foils in this expansion featured two female characters that male fans had historically liked: Seven of Nine (previewing the upcoming Voyager faction of the Federation) and T'Pol (previewing the upcoming Starfleet affiliation). The cards were sold in 11-card expansion packs. The set unfortunately suffered a stalled release date.

'Adversaries Anthology' (release: ??, 2005) The Adversaries Anthology was a collection of eighteen of the most popular Star Trek problems, enemies, and their ships in the game reprinted as foils. The archive foils in this set featured two movie villains: the Borg Queen and Shinzon. The cards were sold in a large card storage box.

8. To Boldly Go (release: August 18, 2006) To Boldly Go was another full 120-card expansion. It introduced the affiliation of Starfleet, the pre-Federation crew from Enterprise as the last full affiliation to be introduced in the game. Gameplay included affiliation-specific dilemmas and reusable events utilizing a new keyword (Replicate). The archive foils in this set featured two show captains: James T. Kirk (previewing the upcoming Original Series faction of the Federation) and Kathryn Janeway (previewing the upcoming Voyager faction of the Federation) . The cards were sold in 11-card expansion packs.

9. Dangerous Missions (release: September 1, 2006) Dangerous Missions was another attempt at making the Star Trek CCG draftable. In other words, players could make decks within a small pool of sealed cards and play. New rules were developed to make the game slightly smaller in scope to adjust for limited resources, including the allowance of a secondary affiliation that would supplement the one sponsored by the product. This draft method remains a sanctioned format. The set consists of nineteen cards broken up into three different boxes, each focusing on an episode or movie for featured personnel, ships, and missions. They also included one unique dilemma and one shared by all three boxes. The boxes also contained Reflections 2.0 packs and three packs from expansions.

10. Captain's Log (release: October 27, 2006) Captain's Log was another full 120-card expansion. It introduced the Federation faction of Voyager, which began with a unique ability to have an all-space deck. Gameplay included strategies based on having the right commander aboard his or her ship and following the opponent around. The archive foils in this set harkened back to the original archive foils. The cards were sold in 11-card expansion packs.

11. Genesis (release: November 13, 2006) Genesis was a 27-card expansion that has the distinction of being the only completely First Edition compatible set in 2E. Each card was designed to work in both versions of the game, with varying degrees of success and introduced the first Original Series personnel and the ability to have an all-planet deck. The cards were sold exclusively from Decipher's website.

12. These Are The Voyages (release: March 13, 2007) These Are the Voyages was another full 120-card expansion. It introduced the Federation faction of The Original Series. Gameplay included the new faction's ability to upgrade by paying more for enhanced abilities, dilemmas based entirely on The Original Series (specifically the slide show images at the end of the classic episodes), and new strategies with The Original Series' main enemies: the Klingons and the Romulans. The cards were sold in 11-card expansion packs.

13. In A Mirror, Darkly (release: June 25, 2007) In a Mirror, Darkly was another full 120-card expansion. Gameplay included cards named after each of the previous releases, more Mirror Universe content, and alternate versions of other personnel who had not been featured in the Mirror Universe, including a battleship version of The Next Generation crew from Yesterday's Enterprise and a historically inaccurate Voyager crew from Living Witness. The cards were sold in 11-card expansion packs.

14. What You Leave Behind (release: December 14, 2007) What You Leave Behind was the last full 120-card expansion. Gameplay included finishing some incomplete themes in the game so far, bonuses for attempting harder missions, and multiple versions of ships telling the story of those ships being commandeered. The cards were sold in 11-card expansion packs. The name of the set itself comes from the last episode of Deep Space Nine. This set was sold exclusively through Hill's Wholesale Gaming.

== The Continuing Committee ==
On December 5, 2007, Decipher announced that it would no longer be releasing new sets or officially supporting the game. Decipher have also since removed all Star Trek-related content from their website. A group of players came together and began work on The Continuing Committee (TCC). The name itself comes from the Romulan Continuing Committee, introduced in Star Trek: Deep Space Nine, as the name was appropriate for the non-profit work being proposed. Since then, most of the game's faithful community has moved its activities to the new site and work has gone into producing "virtual sets" of cards to provide continuous new blood to the game. These activities are not unprecedented, as another Decipher game, the Star Wars Customizable Card Game had ended its run in January 2002 and had established its own players' committee to deal with the same type of issues. While the Star Wars Players' Committee was introduced by Decipher, the Continuing Committee was not. However, the CEO of Decipher endorsed the Star Trek game, saying "We think it's great that enthusiastic players continue to play the game".
