= Young Jedi Collectible Card Game =

- Card backs to the Young Jedi CCG
- Publishers: Decipher, Inc.
- Players: 2
- Setup time: < 2 minutes
- Playing time: ~ 30 minutes
- Chance: Medium to high
- Skills: Card playing Arithmetic; Reading

Young Jedi Collectible Card Game is an out-of-print collectible card game published by Decipher, Inc. that was released in May 1999. It was based on the events and characters of the movie The Phantom Menace in the Star Wars universe. Seven expansions were released before the game was discontinued in September 2001.

Young Jedi was awarded "CCG of the Year" by magazine InQuest Gamer in its annual fan poll.

== Card sets ==
- Menace of Darth Maul - released May 12, 1999
- The Jedi Council - released October 27, 1999
- Battle of Naboo - released April 5, 2000
- Enhanced Menace of Darth Maul - released August 2, 2000
- Duel of the Fates - released November 8, 2000
- Enhanced Battle of Naboo - released January 17, 2001
- Young Jedi Reflections - released July 18, 2001
- Boonta Eve Podrace - released September 5, 2001

The Jedi Council was a 140-card set sold in 60-card starter decks and 11-card booster packs.

== History ==
Young Jedi was released in 1999, just following the first Star Wars Celebration (held in the Wings over the Rockies Air and Space Museum in Denver, CO). Pre-release events were held during the Star Wars Celebration.

The game was the second Star Wars licensed game produced by Decipher (Chuck Kallenbach is listed as the lead designer). The name of the product, "Young Jedi", was in hopes of getting the then-Pokémon playing youth movement of the trading card game player base, and transitioning them into the more adult and complex Star Wars Customizable Card Game, which had been released four years earlier.

The complexity of the game was low, and the player base for the game was far more limited than the older sibling. However, Decipher did support the game with a full range of competitive events, including national and international championships.

- 1999 World Champion: Greg Heisler
- 2000 World Champion: Ian Vincent - Runner up Philippe Parisé
- 2001 World Champion: Katie Billings ^{1}
- 2022 World Champion: Hope Grabowski - Runner up Jacob Tury ^{2}
- 2023 World Champion: Bryan Gravener ^{3} - Runner up Jacob Tury ^{2}
- 2024 World Champion: Bryan Gravener - Runner up Jacob Tury ^{2}
- 2025 World Champion: Raffi Grinberg ^{2}

^{1} Unofficial. Decipher cancelled DecipherCon 2001 due to the proximity to the 9/11 attacks. A player-run replacement, following the same rules and qualification process, was held at the convention, Freedom Con 2001.

^{2} Unofficial. Call to Arms a gaming convention in Virginia is planning to host the 2022 Unofficial World Championships. Originally planned to be held in 2020 and then again in 2021, it was delayed due to the pandemic. It has been widely advertised on the various community social media pages and will be the first major event for the game in over 20 years. The rules are updated slightly and there is no qualification process for entering.

^{3} Bryan Gravener's 2023 victory is disputed due to his use and play of multiple copies of Anakin's Friends. The following year, this was corrected.

== Basic concept ==
=== Deck Construction ===
Decks were built using a colored dot system which limited you to only 10 cards from each color group. There were no additional card limitations put in place. There were a total of six dot colors, and the deck limit was a strict 60 cards.

Decipher later introduced the concept of a white or no-color dot which acted as a wild card during deck construction. You were limited to only one wild card replacement per color and a total of six in a deck.

=== Win conditions ===
There were two win conditions in Young Jedi: run your opponent out of cards, or claim two out of the three planets which acted as battlegrounds for the game (Tatooine, Naboo, and Coruscant).

Each character card had a damage value; this was the number of cards you discarded from your draw deck if the character was defeated.

A planet site was claimed if, at the end of any turn, your opponent had no cards in play at that location.

=== Destiny ===
A well-recognized Decipher game mechanic was used in Young Jedi. Weapons, unlike in SW:CCG, would not "kill" opposing characters, but instead increased the power of a character and included in most cases a "Destiny" draw. Each card had a number between 1 and 6 in the top right corner. This number when revealed as a destiny draw would then be added to your character's power.

=== Battle Plan ===
The mechanic around which combat was based. A battle plan involved each player taking all the character and weapon cards at a site and arranging the order in which they would battle. A "battle card" was usable during this phase of the game and acted as an unknown variable which could change the otherwise predicted outcome of any particular encounter.

== Jedi Council Volunteer Program ==
Decipher's volunteer marketing and event organization corps. This program used players across the world to promote their game, provide a cheap line of communication to local stores, and organize and run competitive events on a local to regional level. These "product champions" did not receive financial compensation, but did receive Decipher product.

== Official end ==
After Decipher lost the license for Star Wars to the Hasbro-owned Wizards of the Coast, a Players Committee was set up to try to continue the games. Due to licensing issues, they would only be permitted to alter existing cards, so they utilized "virtual" cards which changed the game text by creating inserts which would be placed with the card it was adjusting.

While the SW:CCG product still has an active player base (as of 2020), Young Jedi appears to have been dropped and no longer has any support from the committee, but groups of players still make fan cards. In addition, an unofficial world championship is being held at the Call to Arms Convention in Virginia.
