= How to Host a Murder =

Murder mystery game series

- Publishers: Decipher, Inc.
- Publication: 1983
- Genres: Murder mystery game

How to Host a Murder is a long-running series of boxed murder mystery games published by Decipher, Inc. Players take on the roles of suspects after a murder has occurred, all attempting to expose which one of them is the murderer. The setting is supposed to be humorous, with players dressing in costumes and overacting their parts.

The first game in the series, The Watersdown Affair, was published in 1985. Sixteen other How to Host a Murder games have been published since, and the line has also spun off into lines like How to Host a Teen Mystery, a single adult How to Host a Mystery, the kids games How to Host a Kids Party & How to Host a Scavenger Hunt, and the more romantically inclined How to Host a Romantic Evening. The last release was in 2003, but Decipher announced in 2012 new material relating to the series would be appearing on their website, suggesting new releases may occur soon. Decipher's website was updated to announce that these new games would be coming in 2017.

== Games ==
How To Host a Murder Editions

| Episode number | Name of episode | Year created |
|---|---|---|
| 1 | The Watersdown Affair | 1985 |
| 2 | Grapes of Frath | 1985 |
| 3 | The Last Train From Paris | 1985 |
| 4 | Archaeologically Speaking, it's The Pits (AKA Matter of Faxe) | 1986 |
| 5 | The Chicago Caper | 1985 |
| 6 | Hoo Hung Woo | 1986 |
| 7 | The Class of '54 | 1987 |
| 8 | Power and Greede (AKA The Hollywood Premier) | 1985 |
| 9 | The Duke's Descent | 1990 |
| 10 | The Wall Street Scandal | 1991 |
| 11 | Roman Ruins | 1996 |
| 12 | The Good, The Bad, and The Guilty | 1996 |
| 13 | The Tragical Mystery Tour | 1998 |
| 14 | Maiming of the Shrew | 2000 |
| 15 | Saturday Night Cleaver | 2001 |
| 16 | An Affair to Dismember | 2003 |
| Special | All My Children | 1991 |
| Special | Star Trek: The Next Generation (Note: The Star Trek: The Next Generation edition was released under the title "How To Host a Mystery".) | 1992 |

How To Host A Teen Mystery Editions

| Episode number | Name of episode |
|---|---|
| 1 | Hot Times at Hollywood High |
| 2 | Barbeque With a Vampire |
| 3 | Roswell That Ends Well |

== Reception ==
Creede Lambard reviewed The Watersdown Affair in Space Gamer No. 76, and commented that "And the verdict? I cannot recommend this game highly enough. If your dinner parties are becoming a bit dull, or if you and seven or more of your friends want to have a great time one evening, buy The Watersdown Affair."
