= Beyblade Trading Card Game =

Collectible card game

- Designers: Evan Lorentz
- Publishers: Decipher, Inc.
- Players: 2
- Playing time: Approx. 20 minutes
- Chance: Some
- Skills: Card playing Arithmetic; Basic reading ability

Released in 2003 by Decipher, Inc. the Beyblade Trading Card Game is an out-of-print collectible card game based on the Beyblade anime series. It was designed to be simplistic in nature with a slow learning curve. In one format of the game, players did not even need to know how to read. Only one set was released.

== Product distinctiveness ==
One notable feature of the game was that each pack came with personalizing decal stickers which players could put on their cards to make them more distinctive.

== Cards and card availability ==
The Beyblade Collision card set features a total of 130 different cards, including 10 blade cards. Through special retail promotions and other means, an additional 14 promotional foil cards were made available.

Starter packs contain 60 cards, with 5 of these being starter-exclusive foil cards. Booster packs contain 11 cards, including a single rare card. Each booster pack has a 1 in 8 chance of including an "Xtra-Rare" foil card in place of one of the other cards.

== Online play ==
Since this game is no longer in production, there has been a decrease in the number of players. For those who can not find others to play with in person, programs such as LackeyCCG allow players to meet and play online.

== Reviews ==
- Review in Scrye #68
