= Deck optimization =

The term deck optimization (or deck tuning) refers to iteratively improving a play deck in a collectible card game. This is usually done through test or trial play sessions, during which the deck's performance is evaluated. After observation and consideration, changes are made to the deck, and its new performance can then be judged. This cycle can be repeated as needed.

== Key considerations ==
When adjusting the cards in a deck, the following items should be considered:

- Efficiency – How effectively can cards be played and utilized? Does the deck take longer to achieve a victory condition than it should? Is it slow at the beginning of a game, or weak near the end of a game?
- Enjoyment – Is the deck entertaining and fun to play, or is it boring and tedious? While this is much less of a concern for tournament decks, casual decks, which will be played frequently, should probably be enjoyable to use.
- Strategy – Does the deck have a strategy for winning? Are all of the cards in the deck contributing to this strategy (or an alternate strategy), or are there cards that do not in fact do so?
- Weaknesses – Does the deck have a fatal flaw when used against other decks of certain types? Is there a way to compensate for this weakness by changing a relatively small number of cards?

== Optimization methods ==
While players can completely re-design a play deck, most optimizations involve relatively minor changes to the deck. This typically involves selecting a card (of which multiple copies may be present) and replacing it with another card which is similar, but slightly better for one or more reasons. The reasons may include: lower cost, better synergy with existing cards, more flexible alternate uses, or increased effectiveness against known opponent strategies.

In addition to manually poring over card text, the Internet has also become a popular source for those seeking deck optimization information. Players can either directly consult existing deck lists for inspiration, or can ask on online forums for advice or recommendations.

In some cases, effective optimization requires the purchase of additional cards, since the cards a player might like to use may not currently be in his or her possession. This can drive up the cost of the overall gaming experience, and can in some cases initiate an arms race in local circles, where other players must in turn purchase cards to continue to compete.

== See also ==
- Star Wars Customizable Card Game
- Magic: The Gathering deck types
