= Decipher, Inc. =

American game publisher

- Type: Private
- Industry: Role-playing, CCGs, TCGs, card games and board games publisher
- Founded: 1983
- Founder: Warren Holland
- Headquarters: Norfolk, VA, US
- Key people: Warren Holland, Cindy Thornburg
- Products: Star Trek, Lord of the Rings role-playing games, How to Host a Murder board game Past products: Star Wars Customizable Card Game, The Lord of the Rings Trading Card Game, Boy Crazy, Austin Powers Collectible Card Game
- Website: decipher.com

Decipher, Inc. is an American gaming company headquartered in Norfolk, Virginia, US. The company began with three puzzles marketed as "Decipher," subsequently marketing party games and Pente sets. After 1994, Decipher produced collectible card and role-playing games — including their longest-running product, How to Host a Murder Mystery series. Other popular works have included many different card games. Since 2002, Decipher has released two licensed role-playing games: Star Trek RPG and The Lord of the Rings Roleplaying Game.

== History ==
Decipher was founded by Warren Holland in 1983 designing and marketing games. Their first project was the Decipher contest puzzle, a "contest" jigsaw puzzle that challenged buyers to solve four cryptograms printed on the jigsaw puzzle and enter to win a prize. This was followed by Decipher II, of which all four embedded puzzles were solved, though the solution to the last puzzle has since been lost; and Decipher III, which remains unsolved.

The Decipher puzzles led to the launch of the successful How to Host a Murder line of party games. Subsequently, they purchased the license for Pente from Parker Brothers, which they began marketing, maintaining a position in the games market.

Ten years later, after Decipher noticed the advent of collectible card games (CCGs), and game designers Tom Braunlich and Rollie Tesh (both former Pente world champions) conceptualized a media license-based CCG, and in November 1993 approached Decipher with a marketing idea. The following month, Decipher acquired the license from Paramount to create a CCG based on Star Trek: The Next Generation. In August 1994, the new game was previewed for the first time at Gen Con, and in November 1994 it was officially released.

Following the early success of the Star Trek: TNG CCG, Decipher sought another popular media license as a suitable game premise, and in December 1995, after acquiring the rights from Lucasfilm, Decipher released the Star Wars Customizable Card Game in 1995. Both games became extremely popular and were ranked among the top five CCGs for the majority of their production (Star Wars often placing second behind only Magic: The Gathering). Despite an initial planned three-year run for the Star Trek:TNG game, in November 1996 Decipher announced they had renegotiated with Paramount to continue producing the game and expand the license agreement to include not only Star Trek:TNG, but also all of the other live-action Star Trek licenses (including Star Trek: The Original Series, Star Trek: Deep Space Nine, and all of the Star Trek films).

In 1999, with the release of the Star Wars movie The Phantom Menace, Decipher made the decision to expand its market towards a younger generation. Other games like Pokémon were successfully drawing younger kids into card gaming, but Decipher's existing two games were seen as requiring too much thinking and planning for a younger child to properly understand and enjoy. So in response, Decipher created the Young Jedi Collectible Card Game to target this audience. This game used images exclusively from the new movies, while the original Star Wars CCG continued to use images only from the original trilogy until 2001.

In 1999, Decipher made an attempt to merge their previous successes by creating a licensed card game designed to target the party game audience. They acquired the license for Austin Powers: The Spy Who Shagged Me and created the Austin Powers Collectible Card Game. However, because the company was better known as a card-gaming company than a party-game company, by that point the game was seen as a poor attempt at a card game and ultimately failed, with production being put indefinitely on hold after the initial release.

In 2001, Decipher attempted to capitalize further on their successful Star Wars games by creating a third game called Jedi Knights Trading Card Game. This game was distinct from the others because all of the card images were entirely computer-generated. This enabled them to create scenes not seen in the movies, or from new angles. They also increased the breadth of licenses by acquiring the card game license for the new Lord of the Rings series of films being produced by New Line Cinemas beginning that year. This acquisition became even more important at the end of the year when it was announced that Decipher lost the Star Wars license, which ended production on all three Star Wars games.

Decipher made more changes to its target markets in 2002, this time by expanding into role-playing games. Decipher acquired most of the gaming studio from Last Unicorn Games, and extended the licenses that they already held in order to create the Star Trek and Lord of the Rings role-playing games, using a new CODA System which they developed. They also relaunched the Star Trek CCG with a new 2nd Edition, drawing on many of the same game mechanics that had made the first edition so popular, but streamlining them to be easier to learn for new players.

The following year, in 2003 Decipher made another attempt to enter the younger player CCG market, which was now dominated by Yu-Gi-Oh!. They acquired the licenses for and released new games based on the popular .hack and Beyblade series. Although the Beyblade Trading Card Game was short-lived, the .hack//Enemy Trading Card Game was well received and lasted several years.

In 2004, they produced another license-based children's game, this time based on the Mega Man NT Warrior series. They also created their first non-franchised card game entitled Wars, which utilized the same basic game mechanics that had made their original Star Wars CCG so popular.

2005 was a hard year for the company. With the wavering success of the .hack and Mega Man cartoons, they were forced to cancel both lines. The Wars game had failed to gain the audience they'd hoped for because it lacked the brand recognition associated with most of their other games and so it was put indefinitely on hold. After a brief attempt at a resurgence in the form of digital media, they shut down their RPG lines as well. With the overall decline of the gaming industry, in addition to embezzlement which cost the company millions, the company suffered significant financial losses and was forced to lay off as many as 40 employees.

For the next two years Decipher focused on their two remaining properties, Star Trek and Lord of the Rings. However, in 2007 with the expiration of Decipher's license, the company released their final expansion set for the Lord of the Rings TCG, Age's End. On December 12, 2007, Decipher also issued a press release announcing the end of the Star Trek CCG line of product with the next expansion, What You Leave Behind.

During the holiday season of 2007, Decipher replaced their traditional home page with a teaser promising that "a player revolution is coming in 2008." On March 30, 2008, Decipher began looking for Founding Members for their new game series Fight Klub. Fight Klub was designed to be a new style of CCG, using a unique new marketing model. It was released in February 2009, and is themed on combat between (typically macho) characters from several film licences, such as Rambo, Mr. Blonde, and Chuck Norris.

In January 2012, it was announced that their website would shortly also be hosting material related to the "How to Host a Murder" series, suggesting that the series (which had not seen a new release for nine years) may be returning.

=== Embezzlement and financial difficulties ===
In March 2009, it was reported that Holland's brother-in-law Rick Eddleman had pleaded guilty to embezzling over $1.5 million (USD) from Decipher, Inc. since the year 2000. Eddleman had been VP Finances for Decipher since 1993 and used his position to write checks to himself and to use company credit cards for personal purposes. The losses contributed to the company's decision to lay off more than 90 employees.

Eddleman faced a maximum sentence of 12 years in prison for 12 counts of embezzlement and a settlement of a civil lawsuit against him by Decipher for $8.9 million. On July 27, 2009, he was sentenced to six years and five months in prison.

== WARS Fiction ==
In collaboration with science fiction author Michael A. Stackpole and Chuck Kallenbach, Decipher created numerous eBook-exclusive PDFs of short stories to tie into the game. Afterwards, Decipher partnered with Grail Quest books to publish a trilogy of novels set during the Battle of Phobos. However, only two were published.

In 2021, Decipher entered a new partnership with Arcbeatle Press. The company would publish five short stories for the anniversary, before going on to reprint and complete the Battle of Phobos trilogy under the collective title of WARSONG. Simultaneously, the partnership would create a spin-off series, Academy 27.

The partnership would lead to the first WARS crossover, And Today, You, crossing over with the Arcbeatle original series 10,000 Dawns and the Doctor Who independent spin-off Cwej: The Series.

== Player spin-off organizations ==
Following Decipher's loss of the Star Wars franchise rights in 2001, Decipher employees and volunteers of the card game created a new entity entitled the "Star Wars Customizable Card Game Players Committee" (or SWCCGPC). Decipher donated over one million dollars in product, promotional materials, and financial backing to the Players Committee to continue support and tournament organization of the game indefinitely. Since 2002, the Players Committee has created several new virtual card sets for the game.

A Continuing Committee has existed for the Star Trek CCG since 2008, and a Player's Council for the Lord of the Rings TCG was established in 2020.

== Games ==
=== Card games ===
- Star Trek Customizable Card Game (1994–2007)
- Star Trek Online Customizable Card Game
- Tribbles Customizable Card Game
- Star Wars Customizable Card Game (1995–2001)
- Young Jedi Collectible Card Game (1999–2001)
- Austin Powers Collectible Card Game (1999)
- Jedi Knights Trading Card Game (2001)
- The Lord of the Rings Trading Card Game (2001–2007) (Winner of the 2001 Origins Award for Best Trading Card Game)
- .hack//ENEMY Trading Card Game (2003–2005) (Winner of the 2003 Origins Award for Best Tradeable Card Game)
- Beyblade Trading Card Game (2003)
- MegaMan NT Warrior Trading Card Game (2004–2005)
- WARS Trading Card Game (2004–2005)
- Fight Klub (2008)
- Boy Crazy

=== Role-playing games ===
- Star Trek Roleplaying Game (2002–2003, 2005)
- The Lord of the Rings Roleplaying Game (2002–2003, 2005) (Winner of the 2002 Origins Award for Best Role-playing Game)
