= Tom Braunlich =

American customizable card game designer

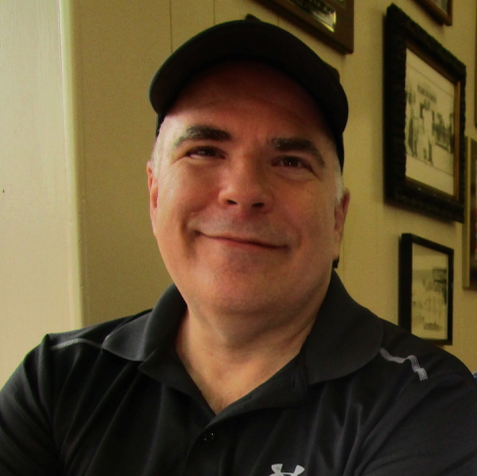
- Braunlich in 2016
- Known for: Customizable card game designer
- Notable work: Star Trek: The Next Generation Customizable Card Game; Star Wars Customizable Card Game

Tom Braunlich is an American customizable card game (CCG) designer.

== Career ==
Thomas Braunlich, son of Frank H. Braunlich Jr. and Phyllis Braunlich, is from Tulsa, Oklahoma, and is a journalism graduate. Braunlich and Rollie Tesh were world champions of Pente, a game originally published by Parker Brothers, and later by Decipher. In 1993, Braunlich and Tesh approached Decipher with their idea for a licensed collectible card game, the result of which they published as Star Trek: The Next Generation Customizable Card Game (1994).

Tom Braunlich worked for Decipher. He helped create the Star Wars Customizable Card Game which was Decipher's most monetarily successful CCG and their second-most successful game in terms of longevity.

Braunlich is also a writer on games, including Pente and chess, and organizer of chess tournaments. Braunlich holds a USCF Life Master rating in chess. On numerous occasions Braunlich has served as the director for the Jerry Spann Memorial Tournament, also known as the Oklahoma Open tournament.

Braunlich is also the author of Weather Knight: A World War II Biography of Frank H. Braunlich Jr.

== Publications ==
- Scholastics and the Soul of Chess: Is Scholastic Chess Killing Tournament Chess, or Saving It? (July 2004)
