= Pente =

Abstract strategy board game

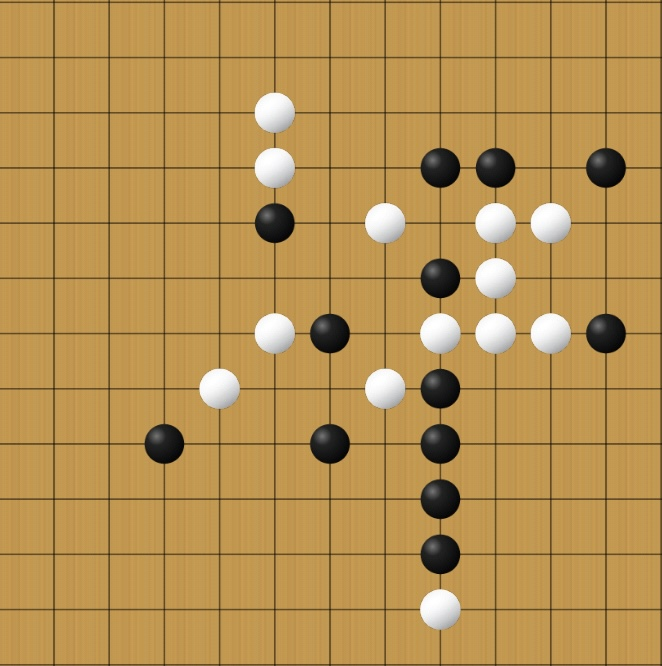
- A sample Pente game
- Publishers: Winning Moves Games USA (2004 – present); Parker Brothers (1983 – 1993); Pente Games (1979 – 1983)
- Players: 2–4
- Setup time: None
- Playing time: 5–30 minutes
- Chance: None
- Skills: Strategy

Pente is an abstract strategy board game for two or more players, created in 1977 by Gary Gabrel. A member of the m,n,k game family, Pente stands out for its custodial capture mechanic, which allows players to "sandwich" pairs of stones and capture them by flanking them on either side. This changes the overall tactical assessments players face when compared to pure placement m,n,k games such as Gomoku.

== Rules ==
Pente is played on a 19x19 grid of intersections similar to a Go board. Players alternate placing stones of their color on empty intersections, with White always assuming the opening move. The goal of the game is to either align five or more stones of the same color in a row in any vertical, horizontal or diagonal direction or to make five captures.

Stones are captured by custodial capture (flanking an adjacent pair of an opponent's stones directly on either side with your own stones). Captures consist of exactly two stones; flanking a single stone or three or more stones does not result in a capture. As an example, if the stones are ⚫⚪⚪▁ and Black places their stone so it becomes ⚫⚪⚪⚫, then White's pair is removed from the board, leaving ⚫▁▁⚫.

A stone may legally be placed on any empty intersection, even if it forms a pair between two enemy stones. If the stones are placed ⚫⚪▁⚫, then White may place their stone so it becomes ⚫⚪⚪⚫. The pair is not captured in this case.

A player wins if they capture ten or more stones.

== History ==
=== Invention ===
Gary Gabrel invented Pente while working as a dishwasher at Hideaway Pizza, in Stillwater, Oklahoma. He took the job while in college at Oklahoma State University to pay room and board, and would play games there with his coworkers, such as Go, Checkers, and the Gomoku family of games. The latter in particular stood out to him, and he noted that it had all the qualities necessary to make a great product. Gabrel, taking the features that appealed to him, used them to invent Pente, increasing the board size, reducing the complexity, and speeding up the game to "fit the western lifestyle."

Ninuki-Renju, the variant from the Gomoku family of games most similar to Pente, is played on the intersections of a 15x15 board with black and white stones. It allows captures of pairs like Pente but has complex opening rules and first player restrictions, such as requiring exactly five stones in a row to win, and restricting the first player from forming open double threes.

Hoping to secure publisher backing, Gabrel sent his new ruleset to ten different companies but was rejected by all of them. Gabrel describes the experience of approaching prospective partners:

I went to the very few acquaintances I had, but they all rejected my propositions because they didn't understand the premise of the game, and they didn't have any respect for me as a prospective professional.

He continued looking for a partner who had both experience and the funds to launch his product, and found someone listed in the phone book as an "inventor". The man already had a project to which he was committed but agreed to help Gabrel. Together they applied for a copyright and had two hundred copies of the game made. Looking for a name, they settled on "Pente" (πέντε), from the Greek word for "five", a reference to the win conditions of getting five in a row or making five captures. They avoided an "oriental"-sounding name despite the inspiration from Go and Gomoku, because according to Gabrel, feelings about the Vietnam War were still "running high."

In 1978, Gabrel, now a manager, intended to quit his job at Hideaway Pizza and devote his time exclusively to Pente, but his partner expressed doubts, saying "the world wasn't ready for Pente." Gabrel's bank rejected his request for a loan several times. He eventually secured a small loan from a different bank and borrowed money from his family, using it to buy out his partner and make a down payment on a GMC van to travel around selling copies of the game.

He traveled across the Southwest, staying a few days each in towns and cities in the area, selling and teaching Pente to gift-store owners, club owners, and reporters. The money gained in each town was usually enough to allow him to continue for a few weeks at a time. Through 1978 and the first half of 1979, Gabrel sold around five thousand Pente sets, with the game being played in several popular clubs in Oklahoma City. Gabrel himself was featured in newspapers across the state.

=== Pente Games Inc. ===
While successful, by the second half of 1979, Gabrel was worried that he would not be able to secure the financing needed to take advantage of the growth opportunities that Pente's popularity was making possible.

He decided to incorporate his Pente business as Pente Games Inc. and secured financing from Dr. Lee Centraccos and his wife, Cookie Centraccos, both of whom had previous experience in the restaurant industry and cable television, and agreed to give Gabrel cash and a $100,000 line of credit in return for twenty percent of the equity in Pente games, a share of the profit, and a position on the company's board of directors.

With funding secured, Pente Games Inc. and Gabrel pursued what they called "the backgammon example", which involved promoting Pente as a fashionable and prestigious game and selling it for seventeen dollars to support its upscale image. Their target demographic was eighteen- to thirty-five–year-old young professionals who were "upscale and fashion conscious." They avoided mass merchandisers to avoid both the complexities of going through buyers in different parts of the country and competing with Monopoly and Risk on the shelves, targeting local and regional gift and department stores instead.

To save money, Gabrel packaged Pente in roll-up vinyl tubes instead of boxes, which made stocking the games on standard shelving more difficult for stores but also stood out visually and distinguished the game from other products on the market.

In the fall of 1979, Pente was picked up by John A. Brown, an Oklahoma department store, and sold twenty thousand sets during the Christmas season. In its first full year in business, Pente Games Inc. sold one hundred thousand sets, and by the end of the second year had sold three hundred thousand.

By 1983, Pente had become popular enough that it was being called "the backgammon of the '80s" and President Ronald Reagan and Hugh Hefner were both said to own sets.

In 1983, an article in the Soviet gaming magazine Игра и логика (Game and Logic) claimed a variant of Pente had independently emerged among mathematics students at Leningrad State University. This version, called “Pyatka” (Пятка, “little five”), supposedly featured a modified rule where captures could only occur diagonally, and players had to complete both a five-in-a-row and three successful captures to win. No other references to this variant are known and some researchers believe the story was a satirical fabrication aimed at Western abstract games.

=== Sale to Parker Brothers ===
On July 2, 1983, Gary Gabrel sold Pente to Parker Brothers for an undisclosed sum. He was adamant that the sale would be the best thing possible for Pente and had assurances from Parker Brothers that the gameplay would not change and that they would continue to fund tournaments and promote the game. The hope was that Pente would move from being a popular new game to the status of a "true classic".

Despite promises to continue to promote Pente as heavily as Gabrel and Pente Games Inc. had, the year after the purchase of Pente, Parker Brothers failed to hold the 1984 championship tournament.

=== Present ===
Currently, Pente is a registered trademark of Hasbro for strategy-game equipment. While Hasbro ceased distribution of Pente in 1993, it later licensed the name to Winning Moves Games USA, a classic games publisher that resurrected the game in 2004. The 2004 version includes four extra stones, called power stones, that can be played in the Pente Plus version.

=== Professional play ===
The now-defunct United States Pente Association was formed in 1982 to "further the communication of Pente players throughout the world" and "assist the growth of Pente enjoyment." It organized in-person tournaments, held postal tournaments through the mail, kept an up-to-date list of player ratings, and released a quarterly newsletter discussing Pente news, problems, and games, among other things.

Pente tournament play is governed in Poland by Polskie Stowarzyszenie Gomoku Renju i Pente (the Polish Association of Gomoku, Renju, and Pente) jointly with Gomoku and Renju.

== First player advantage ==
Pente, much like Gomoku, is known to favor the first player. The Pro Tournament Rule, proposed by Tom Braunlich, was adopted for standard tournament play as an attempt to mitigate this advantage and bring the win ratio at high-level play closer to around fifty percent, as is roughly the case in casual play. Analysis of approximately seven hundred fifty thousand games (Note: These games were played with and without the Pro Tournament rule) played online at Pente.org (Note: Without regard to rating and with timeouts excluded) bears this out, demonstrating a bias of about fifty-three percent across all games and skill levels.

Further analysis showed that when timeouts are excluded and games are filtered out if either player's rating is below 1800 (Note: The total number of games when players below an 1800 rating were filtered out was 59,697) Elo, the first player advantage (FPA) increases from about 53% to about 58%. When the results are filtered to exclude games where the players ratings are below 2000 (Note: The total number of games after filtering out players below a 2000 rating was 17,084) and then 2200 (Note: The total number of games after filtering out players below a 2200 rating was 3,291) the FPA increases again to 59% and then 60%, respectively.

Rollie Tesh, the 1983 world champion, argued in an interview in 1984 that the Professional Pente (Pro Pente) tournament rule was not an effective solution and suggested either adopting mitigation rules from professional Renju tournaments, such as move restrictions on the first player known as forbidden moves, or adopting Keryo Pente.

Tournament Gomoku currently uses what is called the swap2 opening, where a player places three stones (two black and one white) on any of the intersections of the board. The second player can then either choose to play as white and place the fourth stone, swap colors and control the black stones, or put two more stones (one black and one white) and pass the choice of which color to play as to their opponent.

When analyzing tournament data for Gomoku using identical opening rules to Pro Pente, an FPA around sixty-seven percent was calculated. When swap2 was adopted for tournament play, analysis of tournament games showed an FPA drop to about fifty-two percent.

In light of this, the same swap2 opening was adopted for Pente on vint.ee, Board Game Arena, and Pente.org, online gaming websites, as an attempt to mitigate FPA in high-level play.

== Variants ==
=== Gameplay ===
==== Keryo ====
Keryo-Pente was proposed in 1983 by World Pente Champion Rollie Tesh as a way to balance tournament play. The first Keryo Pente tournament took place on June 16, 1984. Keryo-Pente is similar to Pente, changing only the capture rules. As in Pente, if one places five or more stones in a row in any direction, horizontally, vertically, or diagonally, that player wins the game. One may capture pairs like Pente, and in addition may capture three stones in a row by the same custodial capture method. If one captures fifteen or more stones, that player wins the game.

Rollie Tesh believed, in comparison to the first player advantage mitigation rules used by Renju and Gomoku, such as overlines and double restrictions, that Keryo Pente was a more interesting proposal. Keryo Pente mitigates the FPA by "giving the defender more tactical chances . . . the attacker has to be more careful in his play; in regular Pente, the attack often is too easy, as if the attack plays itself."

==== Poof ====
Poof Pente was invented by Pente player Tom Cooley. In normal Pente, when a player places a stone on an empty intersection and creates a pair flanked on either side by the opponent's stones, no capture occurs. In Poof Pente, this is not the case. Any time a pair is flanked between two of the opponent's stones, capture occurs. So, if a line of stones is arranged ⚫⚪▁⚫ and White places their stone so that it creates a line of ⚫⚪⚪⚫, the white pair is removed from play and counted towards capture, leaving ⚫▁▁⚫. All other rules are the same as in Pente.

==== Boat ====
Boat Pente is a variant of Pente invented by Jay E. Hoff in the 1980s. It differs from regular Pente in how it deals with win conditions involving the creation of a Pente (five stones of one color in a row). If a Pente is made, the game continues if the opponent is able to capture a pair across the Pente. This allows the defending player to either win through capture or by forming their own Pente. However, if the defender does not win through their capture, then the attacking player can recreate the pente and win unless another capture across the pente is made. All other rules are the same as in Pente.

==== Ninuki-Renju ====
Ninuki Renju is a predecessor to Pente and one of Gabrel's inspirations for Pente. The winner is the player either to make a perfect five in a row, or to capture five pairs of the opponent's stones. As in Pente, a pair of stones of the same color may be captured by the opponent with custodial capture (sandwiching a line of two stones lengthwise). It differs from Pente in black moving first and its use of a 15x15 board and rule restrictions on the first player, such as the rule of three and three or winning through overlines. The rule of three and three forbids the creation of two lines of three stones at the same time without an opponent's stone blocking on one side of either line. An overline refers to lines longer than five in a row. In Pente, this is counted as a win, while in Ninuki-Renju, it is not. Finally, Ninuki-Renju also allows the game to continue after a player has formed a row of five stones if their opponent can capture a pair across the line, the same as in Boat Pente.

==== Multiplayer ====
Multiplayer Pente can be played with pairs of two players acting as partners, or with multiple independent players each controlling different colored stones. When capturing, the pairs "sandwiched" between two stones can be of any color, but the capturing stones must be the same color.

=== Tournament rules ===
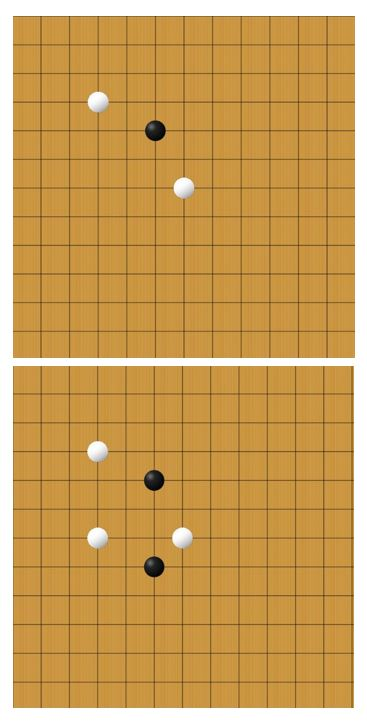
Swap2 Pente: Tentative White has offered an opening. Tentative Black may now choose to play white, choose to play black and place another stone, or place one more stone of each color and pass the choice back to tentative White. Tentative Black chooses option three placing two more stones on the board, one white and one black, and passes the choice of color back to tentative White.

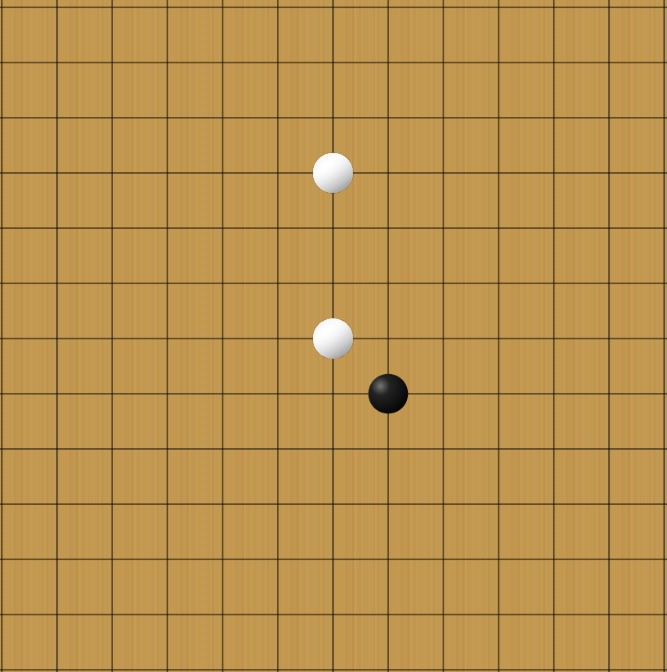
Pro Pente: White places their first stone in the center of the board. Black can place anywhere but decides to place on White’s lower right flank. White’s second stone must be at least three intersections away from their first stone. White has chosen to place 3 intersections North.

Pro is currently the most widely used tournament rule. It restricts the first and second move of the first player, in that the first stone must be placed in the center of the board and the second stone must be placed at least three intersections away from the first stone, leaving two empty intersections in between the two stones. The tournament rule was created by Tom Braunlich to reduce the advantage held by the first player.

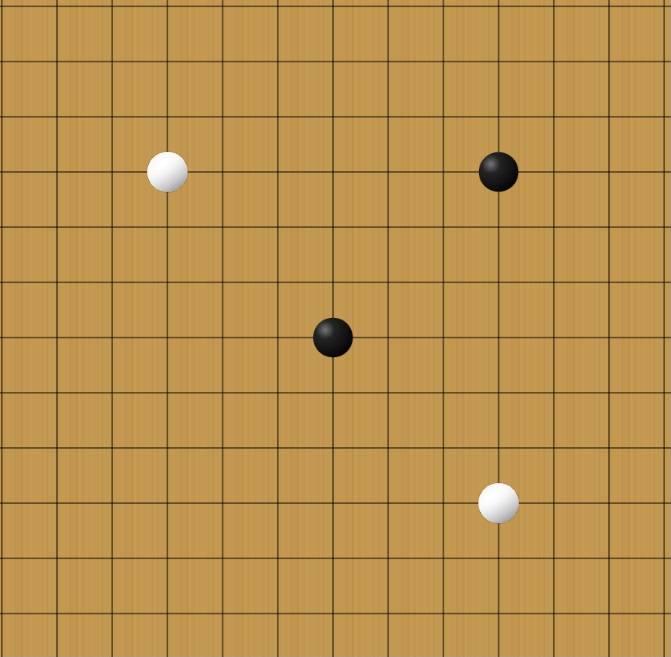
Swap Pente: Tentative White has proposed an opening by placing two white stones and two black stones on the board. Tentative Black may now choose which color to play as. White moves next.

Swap, also known as D-Pente, or DK-Pente if applied to Keryo Pente, is a tournament rule variant that replaces the Pro rule with a version of the pie rule. It is a modified version of the opening rule proposed in the 1983 Pente Newsletter that attempts to mitigate first-player advantage more effectively than the Pro rule by allowing for a greater variety of openings. (Note: Many of which are more balanced than center play using the Pro rule) The first player places two white stones and two black stones anywhere on the board. The second player then chooses which color to play. Play proceeds from there as normal with white moving first again. The Swap opening rule is available for online play on Pente.org after being implemented at the suggestion of Pente player Don Banks.

Swap2, borrowed from professional Gomoku, is a modification of the Swap rule. It seeks to limit the tentative first player's ability to offer known (to them) Swap openings that may be unclear to the tentative second player seeing it for the first time.

The first player places three stones on the board, two white and one black. The second player then has these options:

1. Choose to play as white
2. Choose to play as black and place a second black stone
3. Place two more stones, one black and one white, and pass the choice of which color to play back to the first player.

Because the tentative first player doesn't know where the tentative second player will place the additional stones if they take option 2 or 3, the swap2 opening protocol limits excessive studying of a line by only one of the players. Swap2 Pente is available for online play on Vint.ee and Board Game Arena.

== Strategy and tactics ==
=== Initiative ===
Initiative is a fundamental concept for winning Pente. Initiative is the ability to make a threat or move without having to respond to an opponent's play, while forcing them to respond to yours. A player with initiative essentially controls the state of the board and will eventually win if the other player isn't able to take it back and begin forming their own threats.

=== Basic shapes ===
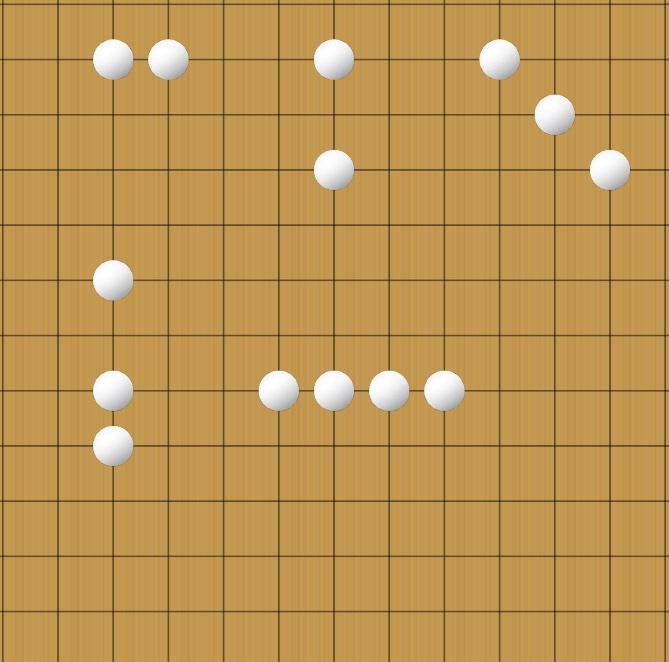
Basic shapes used in pente tactics. From left to right top to bottom: A Pair, a Stretch Two, an Open Tria, a Stretch Tria, and an Open Tessera

Certain basic shapes are fundamental to skillful Pente play. The most important are stretch twos, open trias, stretch trias, and open tesseras.

Pair

A pair is a group of two stones directly adjacent. Pairs are the basis of Pente's capture rules and the only pattern in standard Pente susceptible to capture. Pairs are therefore very weak and vulnerable formations. Beginners are often told outright to simply avoid forming them in a game if they can due to their vulnerabilities. They can, however, be used to great advantage by intermediate and advanced players due to their ability to threaten to form open trias and their use in advanced tactics such as the wedge formation.

Stretch two

A stretch two is a pattern with stones placed near each other with an empty space in between. Stretch Twos are an important skill to learn for beginners. They offer two main benefits for a player. They can threaten to form a line of three stones, an open tria, if unbound on either side by enemy stones, and they stop the player from forming a pair. A pair is vulnerable to capture by the opponent and therefore a liability to player that formed it. If the opponent places a stone adjacent to either side of the pair the defending player must now either sacrifice the pair to capture and play elsewhere, create a threat in another location that cannot be ignored by the enemy, or to protect it by extending it immediately and lose initiative.

Open tria

An open tria is a line of three stones that are not bound on either side of the line by an opponent's stones. Open trias are powerful because they threaten to form an open tessera on the next turn if the opponent does not respond to block the tria. Open tesseras are the most powerful shape in Pente, short of the eponymous and winning "pente" pattern of five stones in a row. An open tria allows the player who placed it to create initiative for themselves because of how it forces the opponent to move to respond. The ability to form many open trias each turn forces the other player to respond and allows the placing player to form a powerful board presence with many options for attack, while the defending generally has to place stones in many locations all over the board that are disconnected and not immediately helpful for forming pentes and other powerful patterns.

Stretch tria

A stretch tria is a shape formed by a single stone placed in line with a pair of stones and a single empty space between them. The stretch tria is vulnerable to counter because an opponent can place a stone between the single stone and the pair and threaten capture. It is powerful, however, because it threatens to form a tessera, and if unbound on either side forces the opponent to respond in a similar way to open tria, creating initiative and allowing play elsewhere on the board without the opponent interfering. The stretch tria can be a very powerful tool when used in conjunction with other stretch trias. A vertical stretch tria with the pair at the top and the single stone at the bottom can be combined with another stretch tria in a diagonal or horizontal line so that both stretch trias share the same single stone. If an opponent tries to stop one of them, then the very next turn, the player who formed the stretch tria can extend the other and turn it into a tessera. If the tessera is unbound the position is likely a winning one.

Open tessera

An open tessera is a line of four stones in any direction without any of the opponent's stones on either side. If the open tessera is not cut across with certain captures that dismantle it, it cannot be stopped from forming a pente and winning the game for the player who formed it. The reason for this is that if an opponent tries to place a stone on either of the sides, the attacking player can simply place a stone at the opposite end and form a pente.

=== Advanced shapes ===
Advanced Pente play often utilizes more complicated shapes built from basic shapes in order to achieve initiative and positional advantage. Among the most common are the I, L, h, X, and H shapes along with the 4x3 pattern, the 5x3 pattern, and the Hat.

The I

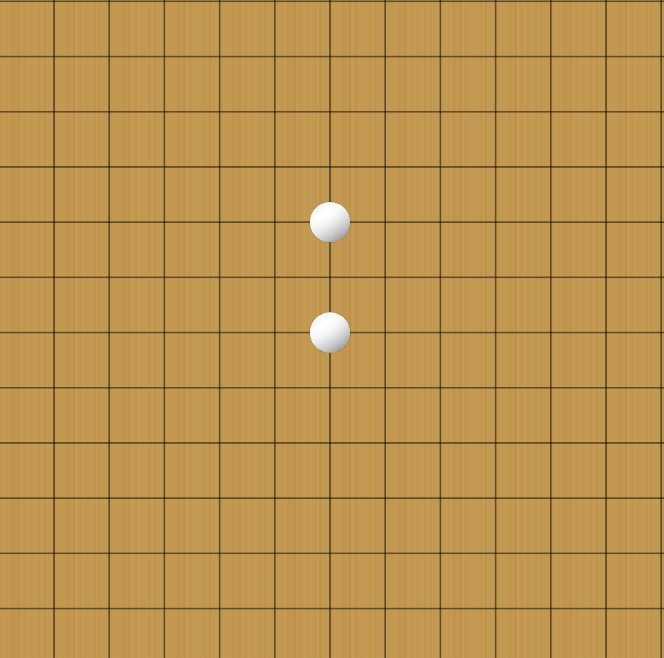
The I shape is formed by an open stretch two.

The I shape is a stretch two unbound on either side and with the space to expand to an L shape in at least one of the applicable directions. The l shape, like the stretch two, protects your two stones from being captured as a pair, and has the ability to threaten to become an open tria or an L shape. It is the weakest of the "letter" shapes and is largely valuable for its potential rather than its strength as a pattern.

The L

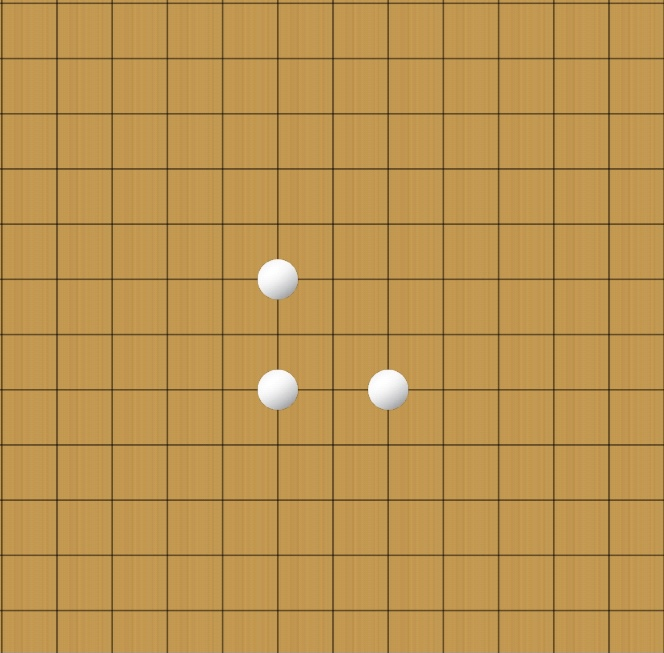
The L shape is formed by three stones in a 3x3 right triangle pattern. The L shape is built by forming another stretch two off of the I shape.

The L shape, pictured left, builds off the I shape by forming another split two using one of the stones from the I shape and forming an L shape. The L shape is protected from capture because of its utilization of stretch twos, but it also has more potential for threats than the I shape. The I shape can be blocked from forming an open tria by placing a stone in between it, however if the opponent tries to do the same with the L shape, then the player who formed can immediately use the stretch two not blocked to form an open tria in two different ways forcing the opponent to respond.

The h

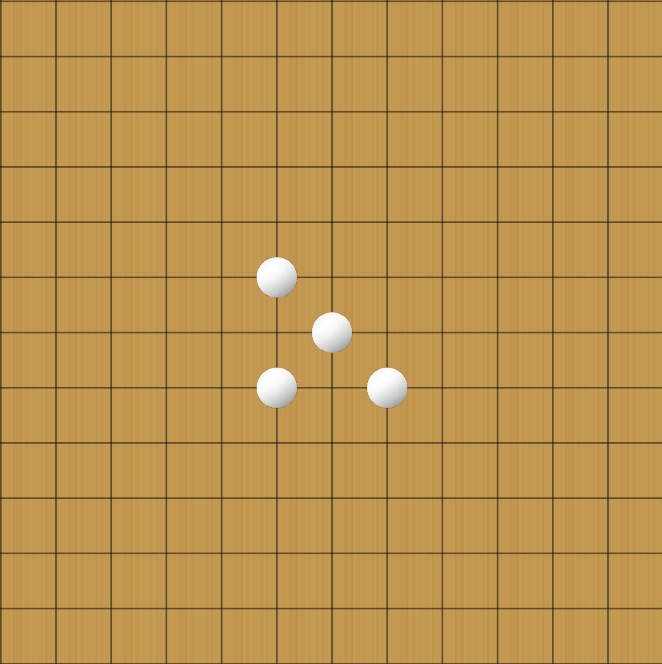
The h shape is created by placing a stone in the center of the L shape. Because the placement of the center stone creates an open tria, the opponent is forced to respond. This allows white to progress to the X shape.

A play that creates an open tria in the middle of the L shape forms the h shape. The h shape is powerful because when it has been formed the opponent must immediately respond to the open tria threat. This begins actively using the potential for threats that began with the I shape and gives the first player initiative. From the h shape a player can immediately form three other open trias. One of the open trias available forms the X shape. If the opponent fails to stop this from happening they will lose the game by allowing the attacking player to form an unstoppable open tessera.

The X

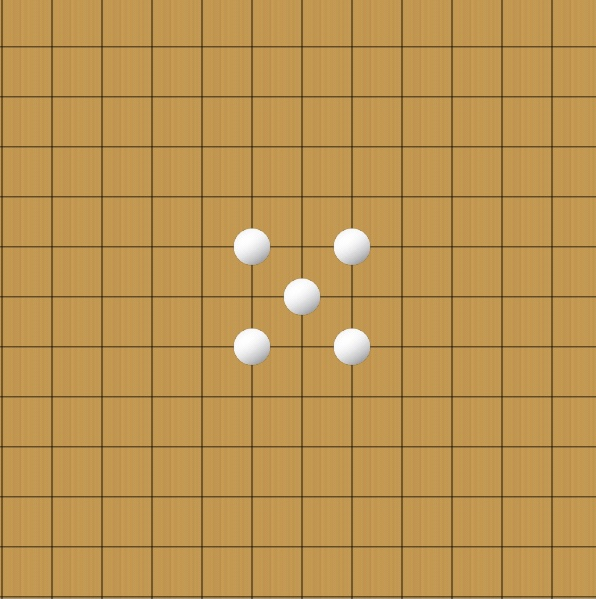
The X shape is formed by two open trias crosscutting each other diagonally. This shape gives the player who forms it four options for building open trias.

The x shape continues the momentum given to it by the h shape. The x shape allows the player to choose from upwards of four open tria threats, but more importantly gives the player enough initiative to form the H shape.

The H

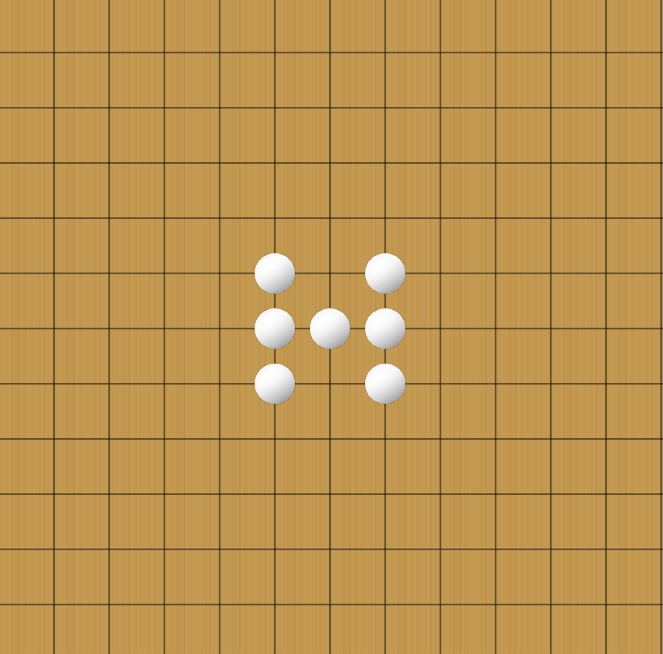
The H shape is formed by creating two open trias out of the x shape on opposite sides of the formation. If it hasn't been effectively dealt with by the opponent it allows the forming player to create two open trias at the same time.

The H shape is the most powerful of the advanced letter shapes. When done in the correct order the H allows the player who made it to end the sequence of letters in a double open three, at least one of which will end in an open tessera. The H shape is made by choosing two of the four open tria threats available to the player in the X formation. If an open tria is made on opposite ends of the X shape so that a pattern resembling a capital H is formed, then the middle of the H creates an open tria at the same time one of the ends does. The opponent cannot block both so one of them can be formed into an open tessera.

4x3 triangle

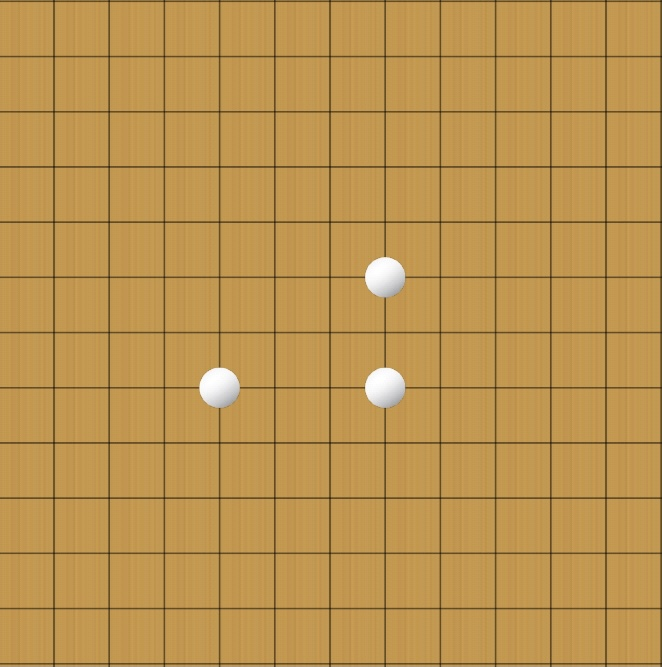
The 4x3 triangle is formed by placing three stones so that a stretch two intersects a potential line formed from two stones and two empty intersections.

The 4x3 triangle is a triangle made of three stones. Two are spaced 4 intersections wide with two empty spaces in between with a third stone placed two intersections away from one of the stones with an empty space in between. This creates two perpendicular "potential" lines. The 4x3 triangle is powerful because it allows you to form an open tria, forcing the opponent to respond, and then form a stretch tria immediately after. Eventually, when played correctly it allows you to form an H shape along with its potential for a double tria threat.

5x3 triangle

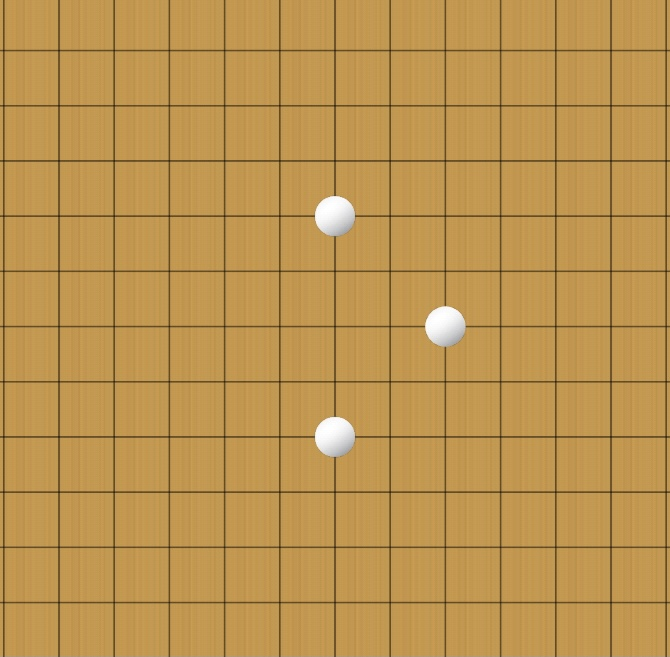
The 5x3 triangle allows the player to form two trias and at least one open tria regardless of how the opponent responds.

The 5x3 Triangle, much like the 4x3 triangle, is a triangle formed by three stones. One side of the triangle is 5 intersections long while the other two sides are 3 intersections in length. The triangle makes use of two stretch twos that allows the player to form an open tria threat even if the opponent attempts to place a stone in between one of the two stretch twos. Rollie Tesh, the 1983 World Champion, argues that, while powerful, it is easier to see for advanced players and therefore easier to counter than several of the other triangle attack patterns that can be used.

The Hat

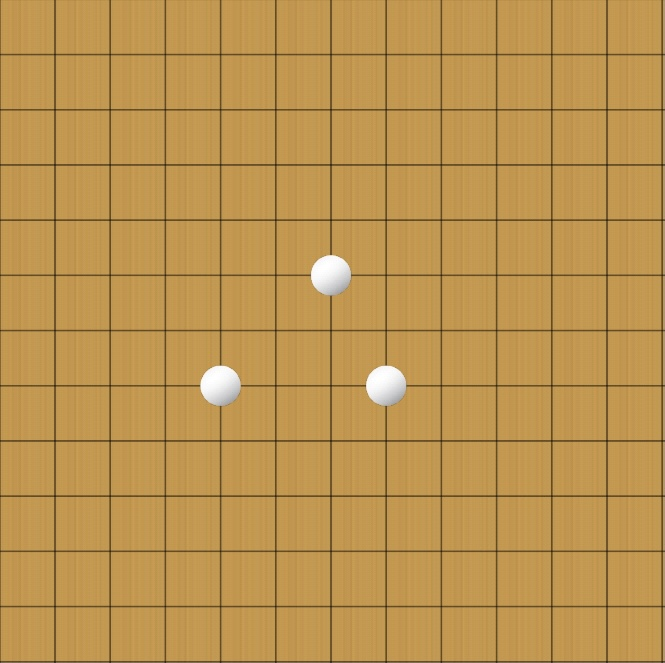
The Hat is a powerful scalene triangle pattern formed by placing three stones. It gives non-obvious potential for creating initiative and forming open and stretch trias.

The hat is a scalene triangle formed by three stones that allows the player to form a stretch tria and then immediately after an open tria, forcing the opponent to respond. Once the open tria is formed, the player can make an X shape and proceed to making an H shape, sacrificing the pair made by its stretch tria in the process.

=== Captures ===
In addition to shapes that provide strong positional advantage, there are several tactics that take advantage of Pente's capture mechanics. Notable among these tactics are the wedge and extension.

The wedge is the use of a pair to block a stretch two. Players will often place stretch twos near an existing line. If the owner of the original line attempts to block the stretch two by placing a stone in-between, they're forced to create a vulnerable pair to do so. The wedge takes advantage of this common protection tactic and flips it on its head setting up the wedge maneuver so that if the player who created the stretch two attacks the pair, the player who initiated the wedge can place a stone to immediately counter by capturing a different pair elsewhere on the board.

Extension

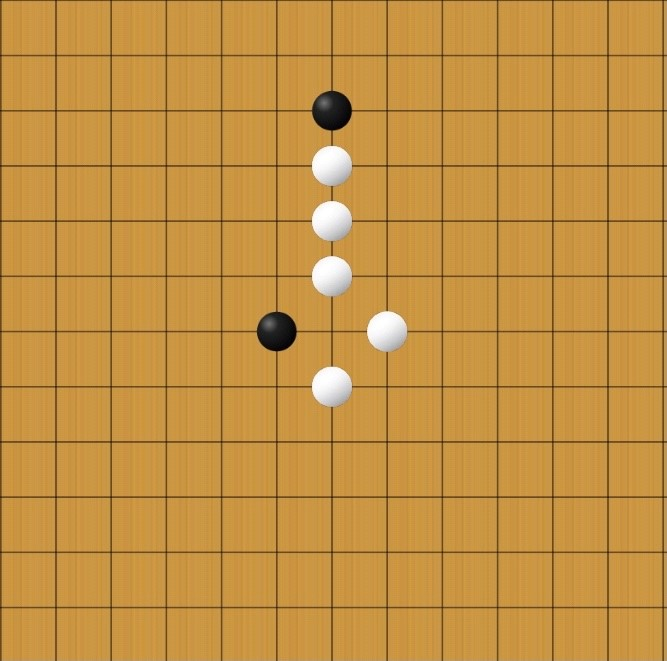
Extension White has formed a stretch tessera that black must block in order to stop a pente from being formed. Because of the location of their stone to the side of the line, when black places to block, white can immediately capture the pair that is formed.

Extension is a tactic used to force captures. Rather than extending a bound tria into a tessera to force the opponent to respond by blocking it, it is sometimes beneficial to "extend" the tria into what's called a "stretch" tessera. A stretch tessera is a line of three stones of one color broken by an empty space followed by another stone of the same color. If the opponent doesn't block or dismantle the stretch tessera, then the player who formed it can create a pente on the next turn. Extension into a stretch tessera is used because of how stones are aligned to the side of the line. If an opponent's stone is lined up so that when another of their stones is placed in the empty space to block, and it forms a pair, this pair can then be captured. Stretch trias can be utilized for this tactic as well so long as they're unbound and threaten to form an open tessera.

== Notation ==
There are two notation systems developed for Pente.

=== USPA ===
The older notation system was used by the USPA for its newsletters and documentation of tournament games. The notation system was based on an xy 2 dimensional grid used in mathematics. The center of the board was notated as "0". Points on the board were measured based on their distance and direction from the center. The four cardinal directions were notated as L, R, U, D for Left, Right, Up, Down, while the number of spaces in any of the directions were notated by a number signifying the empty intersections away from "0." A stone two intersections right and seven intersections up would be recorded as R2U7. If a stone was on the same vertical or horizontal axis as the center point, then the "0" would be left off of the notation. A stone two intersections up from center and zero intersections left or right would be notated simply as U2. Capture moves were notated by placing an asterisk following the notation for the stone's location. For organization, moves were recorded as sets with white's ply on the left and black's ply on the right, and numbered in ascending order according to when they happened in the game.

=== Modern ===
The newer system is notated similarly to the algebraic notation system used in chess, where horizontal values are notated by letters and vertical values are notated by numbers. In Pente this means the board is notated A through T moving left to right and 1 through 19 moving upwards. The center point is notated as "K10." This form of notation is used for online play on Pente.org, Brainking.com, iggamecenter and Vint.ee.

== Reviews ==
- Games #12
- 1980 Games 100 in Games
- 1981 Games 100 in Games
- 1982 Games 100 in Games
- Jeux & Stratégie #26
- Jeux & Stratégie #27 (as "Pagoda")
- Family Games: The 100 Best

== See also ==
- Abstract strategy game
- Connect6
- Gomoku
- M,n,k game
- Renju
