= Star Wars Customizable Card Game =

Collectible card game

Star Wars: Customizable Card Game
- Card backs to Star Wars Customizable Card Game
- Designers: Tom Braunlich, Rollie Tesh, Warren Holland, and Jerry Darcy
- Publishers: Decipher, Inc.
- Players: 2
- Setup time: under 1 minute
- Playing time: Approx. 1 hour
- Chance: Low
- Skills: Deck manipulation, deck optimization, planning, critical decisions, strategy

Star Wars: Customizable Card Game (SW:CCG) is an out-of-print customizable card game based on the Star Wars fictional universe. It was created by Decipher, Inc., which also produced the Star Trek Customizable Card Game and The Lord of the Rings Trading Card Game. The game was produced from December 1995 until December 2001. Since 2002, the game has been maintained by the Star Wars CCG Players Committee, with new virtual cards being released every few months and the capability to play both in person and online.

== History ==
Star Wars CCG was first released in December 1995. Over the years, Decipher added 11 full expansions to the original card base, as well as numerous smaller expansions, special purpose sets, and promotional releases. The last set, Theed Palace, was offered in the fall of 2001. The original game spanned all of the classic Star Wars trilogy (A New Hope, The Empire Strikes Back, and Return of the Jedi). During several years of the game's run, between 1995 and 1998, it was a top-selling CCG, second only to Magic: The Gathering and occasionally surpassing Magic, according to both InQuest and Scrye magazines.

Lucasfilm renewed Decipher's license in 1998 to include intellectual property from The Phantom Menace, the first film in the Star Wars prequel trilogy. In addition to expansion sets based on the films, Decipher planned to release sets based on the novels and computer games, and a new trading card game base on the prequel trilogy films. At the end of 2001, after much negotiation, Lucasfilm chose not to renew Decipher's license to use the Star Wars intellectual property. The license was granted to Wizards of the Coast, which used it to create their own game, the Star Wars Trading Card Game. Decipher could no longer legally create new expansions to SWCCG; many cards that were in development were never released to the public.

In January 2002, Decipher CEO Warren Holland announced the formation of a "Players' Committee". Decipher would turn over stewardship of the game to this group, originally composed of six player advocates, who would continue to organize sanctioned tournaments, as well as designing and releasing new "virtual cards" to keep the game fresh. Over two decades later, the Players' Committee still supports an active player base around the world, organizing several major tournaments each year, providing a platform for online play, and releasing new sets of virtual cards every few months.

== Gameplay ==
Dark and Light Side card fronts and backs; these two are character cards

Each game requires one player to play the light side of the Force while the other plays the dark side. In friendly play, a player can specialize in one side or the other, but for tournaments, players need both Dark and Light decks. This two-sided aspect is rare in customizable card games (Star Wars: The Card Game and Netrunner being the other notable examples). The action of the game occurs at various "Location" cards (both interstellar and planet-bound) familiar from the Star Wars Universe. Locations can be deployed as the game progresses; furthermore, most locations come in both Dark and Light-side versions, and an on-the-table location can be "converted" (changed to the other side) at any time. Most locations affect game play in some way; all also provide "Force icons", which represent the amount of "Force" a player can activate per turn.

Force is the game's resource and its defining trait. Each unit of "Force" is simply a card from the top of a player's deck, placed off to one side in the "Force Pile". When used to deploy something, each unit of Force is placed on the "Used Pile", which then cycles back to the bottom of the deck. Unused Force remains in the Force Pile, and can be conserved for the next turn or drawn into the player's hand. The objective of the game is to make the opponent discard all of their Life Force (consisting of Reserve Deck, Force pile and Used pile). This is accomplished via "Force Drains" (forcing the opponent to discard cards by controlling, unopposed, a location with their Force Icons on it), battling opposing characters, and resolving certain climatic situations (for instance, freezing a character in carbonite, winning a pod race, dueling a Jedi).

The game system also features "Destiny draws", which represent the elements of chance, uncertainty, luck, random chance and the Force. Each card has a destiny number, from 0 to 7, at the top-right corner (except locations, which count as destiny 0), and rather than using dice for generating random numbers, players "draw destiny" from the top of their deck, revealing the top card and using its destiny number as the result. This is used for a variety of purposes, from determining weapon hits to mandatory losses incurred by the opponent to resolving whether a character passes a Jedi Test. The drawn Destiny card goes to the Used Pile and is recycled into the deck. Through this system, a skillful player can legally count cards, remembering where the high-destiny cards are in the deck. Stronger (or rarer) cards generally have lower Destiny values (with some exceptions); as a result, less-experienced (or economically challenged) players are more likely to find that "The Force is with [them]".

== Sets ==
=== Full expansion sets ===
The following full sets were created by Decipher:

- Premiere (1995) - This was the first set for the Star Wars CCG and included the characters of Luke Skywalker, Han Solo, Leia Organa, C-3PO, Obi-Wan Kenobi, and Darth Vader as well as many other cards that formed the core of the game. One of the most potent strategies was to pair Vader and Grand Moff Tarkin at an important location. Acting in concert, they can cancel an opponent's destiny draw (unless Vader is targeted by Uncontrollable Fury, which was released in the Cloud City expansion). All of the card art images from this set were derived from A New Hope. This set, along with A New Hope and Hoth, were sold in booster packs of 15 cards that retailed for US$3.00.
- A New Hope (1996) - This 121-card set featured additional cards taken from the first Star Wars movie. Important debuts in this set included Chewbacca and R2-D2. Also of note were the introduction of the Death Star as a system card, the introduction of creatures, and a new mechanic that allowed for the destruction of entire planets. It was sold in 15-card booster packs.
- Hoth (November 1996) - This was the first set to include images from The Empire Strikes Back. It was also the first set to introduce the mechanic of a "persona", a version of a main character with alternate abilities (e.g., Commander Luke Skywalker vs. Luke Skywalker). Also included in this set were the immense AT-AT walkers. Another new rule was the "Hoth Energy Shield Rules" which prevents the Dark Side player from deploying his cards on the first four "marker" Hoth sites, and all interior Hoth sites; unless the Main Power Generators is "blown away". It was a 162-card set.
- Dagobah (April 1997) - This set featured cards from the middle part of The Empire Strikes Back. Significant cards included Yoda, another new version of Luke (Son of Skywalker) and all of the bounty hunters (except Boba Fett), their ships, and weapons. This set was also the first to be sold in packs of 9 cards with an original retail price of US$2.50 per pack, where the last card in the pack would always be the rare card. This was to ensure that players and collectors could acquire more rare cards and fewer common and uncommon cards. When originally released, this set developed a bad reputation among players because of the introduction of many new strategies that focused the game on deck manipulation at the expense of the intense battling that had originally made the game so popular.
- Cloud City (1997) - This set is based on the final third of The Empire Strikes Back and included new versions of Han Solo and Leia and also introduced Lando Calrissian as a character card in the game. He was also unique in that he had both Light Side and Dark Side personas. It also added Boba Fett to the game (although he had been available as a preview card in the First Anthology released earlier in the year). This set also introduced "dueling" as a major strategic mechanic for the Dark Side and provided for the possibility that Luke could be turned to the Dark Side. Cloud City also attempted to correct the abusive "numbers" strategies prevalent since the release of Dagobah. Due to a large print run, this set, as of 2009, is still very easy to acquire. Willrow Hood, a previously unknown character who made a two-second cameo in The Empire Strikes Back acquired a short backstory in this deck. There were 180 cards in the set (50 common, 50 uncommon, and 80 rare) sold in 9-card booster packs.
- Jabba's Palace (1998) - This was the first set to feature cards from Return of the Jedi and focused on the opening scenes of the film where the heroes tried to rescue Han Solo from Jabba the Hutt. Jabba himself was an important card, as was the new version of R2-D2 (Artoo), but overall this set was seen as being weak, especially from a tournament perspective, by players who complained that there were simply too many aliens that had little or no competitive use. This is, as of 2009, the cheapest and easiest set to purchase. The 180-card set was sold in 9-card booster packs.
- Special Edition (1998) - This was the largest set since Premiere and the first to introduce new starter decks (which included many cards that could only be found in them). This set was seen as something of an overhaul of the game since it changed some game terms and attempted to make the entire play experience more streamlined through the release of a comprehensive rulebook and glossary. The most notable addition in this set was the introduction of the "objective" mechanic. These cards allowed a player to start many more cards and provided a movie-based goal for a player's deck. Many players praised this addition, arguing that it made little-used strategies (like freezing people in carbonite) useful. Others argued that it limited creativity and led to cookie-cutter decks based around various objectives that all looked and played the same. This set introduced the widely popular "Darth Vader, Dark Lord of the Sith" persona.
- Endor (1999) - This was the first of two sets to focus on the latter two-thirds of Return of the Jedi. It included a vast number of characters and vehicles that were designed to be useful in battles. Upon release, this set garnered a poor reputation because of the sheer number of ostensibly new but seemingly redundant characters and vehicles contained therein. However, its reputation improved over time, as later expansions have allowed for new decks featuring large amounts of Endor cards, and it is, as of 2009, one of the more valuable and expensive sets to purchase.
- Death Star II (2000) - This set was the second to focus on the end of Return of the Jedi and along with Endor forms a stand-alone environment, in which all of the cards from those two expansions can be played independently of the other sets. This was also the first set to feature ultra-rare cards (Luke Skywalker, Jedi Knight and Emperor Palpatine). The inclusion of these two very powerful and iconic characters, in addition to many useful supplementary cards, coupled with general praise for its elegant design, has given the set lasting appeal and led to it being, as of 2009, one of the more expensive sets to purchase. This set, and all after it, were sold in 11-card packs for a retail price of US$3.29.
- Tatooine (2001) - Tatooine was originally scheduled to be a set based on the Skywalker family; this idea, however, was abandoned when Decipher decided to allow for elements of the film Star Wars: Episode I – The Phantom Menace, the first of the prequels, to mix with the "Classic Trilogy" cards, at the request of Lucasfilm. Thus, this set includes Qui-Gon Jinn, Darth Maul, Padmé Naberrie, as well as a younger version of Obi-Wan, and was heavily focused on "pod racing". Anakin Skywalker was not included either in this set or the following ones to avoid problems with having both him and Darth Vader in the game (ultimately, no Anakin card was ever printed). This set, which contained fewer total cards than previous expansions, seems to have had a relatively large print run, and thus it is relatively easy and inexpensive to acquire.
- Coruscant (2001) - Coruscant focuses on events from the middle of Star Wars: Episode I – The Phantom Menace, especially Senatorial conflict. A very limited print run along with powerful strategies has made it by far the most expensive set and hardest to acquire. There are a number of notable cards in this set, including new versions of Queen Amidala, Qui-Gon, and Darth Maul as well as the introduction of Mace Windu.
- Theed Palace (2001) - This was the last set produced for Star Wars CCG. The most popular and notable card in this set is Darth Sidious who was, at that time, not considered by Decipher to be the same person as Emperor Palpatine or Senator Palpatine in the "game universe". For gameplay reasons, these three cards remained separate personas for over 20 years, until the persona rules were overhauled in November, 2021. This set is also somewhat difficult to acquire.

Unlimited white-border editions of the sets A New Hope, Hoth, and Dagobah were released in August 1998 after their original limited edition print run had sold out.

== World Champions ==
Year	Champion	Nationality	Runner-up	Nationality	Worlds Location	Round 1 Participants
2026	Brian Fred	USA	Justin Desai	USA	Bloomington, Minnesota, USA	58
2025	Greg Shaw	USA	Joe Olson	USA	Seattle, Washington, USA	55
2024	Joe Olson (3)	USA	Emil Wallin	SWE	Bochum, Germany	53
2023	Hayes Hunter	USA	Casey Anis	USA	Morristown, New Jersey, USA	69
2022	Justin Desai (3)	USA	Matthew Harrison-Trainor	CAN	Atlanta, Georgia, USA	51
2021	Joe Olson (2)	USA	Matt Scott	USA	Crystal City, Virginia, USA	60
2020	Joe Olson	USA	Quirin Fürgut	GER	Online	97
2019	Bastian Winkelhaus (3)	GER	Bryan Mischke	USA	Bochum, Germany	69
2018	Bastian Winkelhaus (2)	GER	Tom Kelly	USA	Morristown, New Jersey, USA	69
2017	Phillip Aasen	USA	Jonathan Chu	USA	Bloomington, Minnesota, USA	59
2016	Tom Haid	USA	Reid Smith	USA	Princeton, New Jersey, USA	62
2015	Justin Desai (2)	USA	Jonathan Chu	USA	Philadelphia, Pennsylvania, USA	61
2014	Emil Wallin (2)	SWE	Brian Terwilliger	USA	Toronto, Ontario, Canada	31
2013	Justin Desai	USA	Reid Smith	USA	Boston, Massachusetts, USA	60
2012	Emil Wallin	SWE	Angelo Consoli	GER	Bochum, Germany	54
2011	Kevin Shannon (2)	USA	Brian Herold	USA	Washington, D.C., USA	63
2010	Dan Kim	USA	Kyle Krueger	USA	Philadelphia, Pennsylvania, USA	61
2009	Brian Hunter	USA	Justin Desai	USA	Princeton, New Jersey, USA	53
2008	Kevin Shannon	USA	Kyle Krueger	USA	Minneapolis, Minnesota, USA	60
2007	Jonathan Chu (2)	USA	Justin Desai	USA	Chicago, Illinois, USA	45
2006	Nate Meeker	USA	Brian Hunter	USA	Chicago, Illinois, USA	34
2005	Drew Scott	USA	James Booker	USA	GenCon, Indianapolis, Indiana, USA	
2004	Brandon Schele	USA	Reid Smith	USA	GenCon, Indianapolis, Indiana, USA	
2003	Jonathan Chu	USA	Greg Shaw	USA	DragonCon, Atlanta, Georgia, USA	
2002	Angelo Consoli	GER	Greg Shaw	USA	DecipherCon, Virginia Beach, Virginia, USA	
2001	Bastian Winkelhaus	GER	Martin Akesson	SWE	FreedomCon, Virginia Beach, Virginia, USA	
2000	Matt Sokol	USA	Yannick Lapointe	CAN	DecipherCon, Kissimmee, Florida, USA	72
1999	Gary Carman	GBR	Steven Lewis	USA	Virginia Beach, Virginia, USA	32
1998	Matt Potter	USA	Michael Riboulet	GBR	Virginia Beach, Virginia, USA	56
1997	Philipp Jacobs	GER	Michael Riboulet	GBR	Norfolk, Virginia, USA	52
1996	Raphael Asselin	CAN	Bjørn Sørgjerd	NOR	Vail, Colorado, USA	32

== Reception ==
In the April 1996 edition of Arcane (Issue 5), Andy Butcher gave the game a top rating of 10 out of 10 despite stating that "Star Wars is let down by two things: its rulebook and the distribution of the cards.".

In the June 1996 edition of Dragon (Issue 230), Rick Swan liked the "first-rate presentation" of the cards. But he was disappointed with gameplay, saying "if only Star Wars played as good as it looked. But alas, it is merely okay." He found the rules "a bit clunky". The game "loses steam toward the end, when the outcome becomes all but inevitable." And he felt that the starter packs of only 60 cards made for a limited game, stating "You'll need a much larger pool – I'd guess at least 100 Dark Side cards and 100 Light Siders – to make Star Wars come alive." He concluded by giving it an average rating of 3 out of 6, saying, "In today's deck-drenched market... it's just another card game, eminently playable but nothing to squander the rent money on."

In 2006, Trading Card Games For Dummies highlighted that the "Decipher Star Wars: Customizable Card Game enjoyed a huge following, spawning world tournaments, gorgeous trophies, dedicated fans and a great card game. Then Decipher's Star Wars license expires and this game, too, faded into near-obscurity. Although cards are no longer available, Star Wars still enjoys a devoted, albeit small, following. Players organize tournaments, trade, and talk about deck design, which is quite a commendation for a game that's been out of print for several years. [...] Decipher's Star Wars game plays very differently than its namesake published by Wizards of the Coast".

=== Reviews ===
- Backstab #7 (Cloud City)
- Backstab #10 (Jabba's Palace)
- Casus Belli #118
- Świat Gier Komputerowych #51
