= Lost Trinity =

Tabletop role-playing game supplement

Cover art by Ran Ackels

Lost Trinity is a mini-campaign published by Precedence Entertainment in 1995 for the supernatural role-playing game Immortal: The Invisible War.

== Contents ==
Lost Trinity is a series of three chronologically-linked adventure scenarios. In addition to the text of the adventure, the book contains 17 color prints to be used as player handouts, a color map, and a CD to be used during the adventures. The CD contains music, sound effects, and a broadcast titled "Radio Eternity" that includes a lead for the plot.

== Publication history ==
In 1994, Precedence Publications released the supernatural role-playing game Immortal: The Invisible War, and followed that with several supplements, one of those being Lost Trinity, a 128-page softcover book designed by Ran Ackels, with cover art by Ackels, and illustrations by Ackels and Dee Beckwith.

== Reception ==
In the inaugural issue of the British game magazine Arcane, Lucya Szachnowski noted that "Lost Trinity has a dreamlike quality ... The system is quite easy, but it is not a beginner's game because of its heavy reliance on jargon and odd concepts." Szachnowski was impressed with the quality of the book, commenting, "The presentation of all Immortal products is stunning and this is no exception." Szachnowski also liked the structure of the adventures, saying, "The scenario uses an easy-to-follow format with plenty of referee's hints, tips, cues, background reminders and cross references to relevant rules. This helps make the scenario a joy to referee, even if you have not run Immortal before." Szachnowski concluded by giving this book a rating of 7 out of 10.

In Issue 233 of Dragon (September 1996), Rick Swan wrote "Lost Trinity, a series of three linked adventures, mixes political intrigue and supernatural shocks with remarkable finesse. The text sparkles with memorable encounters and characters, supplemented with narration and special effects from the compact disc." Swan concluded by giving this a top rating of 6 out of 6, saying, "As good as Call of Cthulhu in its prime, though without all the gaudy monsters, Lost Trinity is a breathtaker."
