= The Wheel of Time Collectible Card Game =

Collectible card game

- Game card back showing the Wheel of Time, the Yin-Yang symbol of the One Power, and the symbols of the Dragon
- Publishers: Precedence Entertainment
- Players: 2 or more
- Setup time: < 5 minutes
- Playing time: > 90 minutes
- Chance: Medium to High
- Skills: Card playing

The Wheel of Time Collectible Card Game is an out-of-print collectible card game published by Precedence Entertainment in December 1999 and based on Robert Jordan's The Wheel of Time fantasy novel series. The game was somewhat unusual among contemporary collectible card games because it required a play mat with tokens and customized six-sided dice to play. It uses some similar game mechanics to the Babylon 5 Collectible Card Game and the Tomb Raider Collectible Card Game, which were also published by Precedence.

== Overview ==
Opposing players represent the forces of good or evil and reenact the epic struggle for victory as told in Jordan's books. While building up forces in the form of supporting characters and troops, and enhancing them with powerups, the player tries to weaken the opponent by hampering them with effects and inflicting damage during battles. These battles are fought over "challenges", missions that each player can initiate. The winner of the challenge receives a specific reward as specified by the challenge. The dice are used to generate four different kinds of abilities, needed for recruiting characters, doing damage, and generating support or opposition during the challenges and the Last Battle.

Players try to obtain dominance by controlling the "Pattern", which is accomplished by winning the Pattern challenge that is initiated each turn. Dominance gives a player the advantage of knowing what the opponent does before acting himself. When the Pattern is filled with 20 tokens, the game's final act commences: The Last Battle. All characters and troops able to fight must enter the battleground for this epic clash. Rounds of battle are fought until one player has generated more than five support over the opponent's total opposition; that player wins the game. The other way to win is by eliminating the opponent's starting character.

== Game play ==
(Taken from the old Precedence site)

=== Released card sets ===
1. The Wheel of Time: Premier Edition (300 cards)
2. 1st expansion set: Dark Prophecies (150 cards)
3. 2nd expansion set: Children of the Dragon (154 cards)
4. Limited Enhancement set: Cycles (containing just 4 cards)
5. Promo cards: various cards given away as prizes, gifts or found in booster boxes.

Although they were rumored to be in their late design stages, the 3rd expansion "The White Tower" and the revised base game "2nd Edition" never came to be due to Precedence's demise.

=== Card types ===
==== Characters and troops ====
Character cards represent the significant individuals in the game. All characters have allegiances to different factions within the game, which determines how much it costs to recruit them and be able to play them from hand. Most characters have some special ability that they can use as listed in their effect text. Characters have up to four abilities at various ratings: Politics (green), Intrigue (Blue), One Power (white) and Combat (Black). The numbers in these colored boxes are how many dice the character rolls of that color. Troops are like characters, but they represent large amounts of secondary characters in the game and they usually only have a Combat Ability.

A player can normally only have one copy of a troop or character in the game unless they have the "Multiple" trait. Troops and characters usually participate in challenges, but do not interact with one another directly. Instead, characters interact with characters and troops interact with troops.

==== Advantages ====
(Including Starting Advantages) Advantages are long-term effects that a character, the player, or troops can gain. Advantages tell a player what they can affect (Character, Troop, Player, World [world affects all players]). Until discarded, the advantage remains in effect. If the card an advantage is attached to leaves play, so does the advantage.

Prophecy cards are very powerful advantages, and have certain requirements that must be met before they can be played. They reflect the various concepts of the Prophecies from the Jordan novels.

==== Challenges ====
Challenges represent the goals a player tries to accomplish to win the game. Challenges have various effects depending on whether they are successful or not. Characters and troops must be allotted to participate in challenges in order to try to get them to succeed. Many challenges allow a player to gain Pattern, some have other effects.

==== Events ====
Events represent actions taken by characters or a happening that is beyond their reach. The effects are determined as soon as the card is played. Its effects must be resolved immediately and no other events can be played until after the effects of the first event have been resolved. Unless it says otherwise, effects expire at the end of the current turn. Some events are limited events that a player can only play during their action round. There are few events which specify when they can be played, and most events are simply played when appropriate.

The Wheel of Time playing mat

=== General information ===
==== Ability symbols ====
Ability symbols are marked on the dice. Each book a player rolls on the green die indicates a point of Politics they can spend, each Chalice on the blue Intrigue, each Yin-Yang on the white is One Power and each Rider and Horse on the Black is Combat. Most all cards have a number of these symbols listed at the bottom, which represents the cost of recruiting the card.

The other three symbols on the dices are used in challenges. The sword counts as a point of support for a challenge, the shield counts as a point of opposition, and the skull counts as damage done toward the opposition.

Some dice have sides with multiple symbols. These faces count as either symbol, depending on what the dice is rolled for.

There are also colored blank tokens used to show which challenges players are participating in and numbered tokens used to keep track of how much of an ability a player has generated.

==== The Pattern ====
The Pattern is the focus of the game. Each turn a token is to be placed on the Pattern. Depending on how various challenges go during the turn, the token could be in the neutral area, the light area, or the dark area. When there are 20 tokens on the Pattern, the last battle starts, in which the side with the most tokens has an advantage.

==== Last Battle ====
The Last Battle is a special challenge at the very end of the game that goes on until a player has enough points to win. 'It's the big battle at the end of every good book, where all the cards are on the table and it's do or die time!', according to Precedence ads.

==== Dominance ====
Whichever faction has the most pattern tokens on their side has dominance. This affects who goes first and last at the various stages of a turn.

==== Allegiances ====
It is easier to for a player to play a character card when they have other cards with the same allegiance on the table, and it is less expensive to recruit cards of the same allegiance.

==== The factions ====
Dragon Reborn: Led by Rand al' Thor, the faction of Light attempts to sway the Pattern to their side to stop the Forsaken.

The Forsaken: Never truly trusting one another, but working together to bring their own darkness to the Pattern and rule the world.
