= The Shapeshifters Manual =

Tabletop role-playing game supplement

The Shapeshifters Manual is a supplement published by Precedence Entertainment in 1996 for the modern-day fantasy role-playing game Immortal.

== Contents ==
The Shapeshifters Manual is a supplement that examines the Himsati, the animal forms that Immortal characters can shape-change into.

== Publication history ==
The Shapeshifters Manual is a 96-page softcover book designed by Ran Ackels and Brianna Von Gries, with illustrations by Ran Ackels and Dee Beckwith.

== Reception ==
In the July 1996 edition of Arcane (Issue 8), Andy Butcher didn't like all the new rules presented in this book but thought that Immortal players needed the book, commenting that "The Shapeshifter's Manual is both attractively designed and packed with information. It has to be said that using this book will add a fair amount of complexity to the game, both in terms of new rules, and new jargon for players and referees to learn. Despite this, it's something of a must for any Immortal group, new or old." Butcher gave the book an above average rating of 8 out of 10.

In the September 1996 edition of Dragon (Issue 233), Rick Swan was unimpressed with the book, calling it "not so good." Swan thought the animal powers presented "are okay", but found the rest of the book to be "an excess of filler (like the l-o-n-g introduction)." Swan gave the book a below average rating of 3 out of 6, calling it "non-essential."
