= QuickStrike =

Collectible card game

- Designers: Upper Deck
- Years active: 2006

QuickStrike is an out-of-print collectible card game gaming system developed by Upper Deck for use in their games. This system made its initial debut in 2006.

== Compatibility ==
All games making use of the QuickStrike system are compatible with one another, with the cards from different game sets able to be mixed together in a single deck. Specific tournaments or game formats may require that a deck consist of only cards from a single television series or film.

The QuickStrike mechanics appear to be based on the rules from the older Shaman King Trading Card Game (also from Upper Deck Entertainment), and share a number of similarities with this earlier game. The cards from this earlier title are not, however, directly compatible.

== Game system explanation ==
Games are fought as one-on-one battles between two characters, with each player represented by one of the characters. The objective of the game is to be the first player to score three points. A point can be earned when opponents are unable to stop an incoming attack after it has penetrated all three of their colored zones.

=== Cards ===
Unlike in many collectible card games, games utilizing the QuickStrike system do not involve players playing cards from a hand. Instead, players simply flip over cards from the top of their decks at the appropriate times. The cards which are flipped over consist of the following types:

- Strikes - Cards with a blue border can be used either offensively, to launch an attack, or defensively, to stop an opponent's attack.
- Advantages - Gold bordered cards represent special training and tactics. These cards have a number of different uses, including allowing players to charge a zone.
- Allies - Cards with a purple border represent friends and companions who are providing assistance.

Players also have a special Chamber card, which holds hidden signature moves for a character. At the appropriate points during play, a powerful signature move can be slid out of the Chamber and revealed.

=== Zones ===
Games are played utilizing a playmat, which provides each player with three colored zones. The green zone is the first line of defense, with the yellow zone being second, and the red zone being the last chance to successfully stop an attack. The zones are where players flip over cards to defend against attacks, as well as where stored sources of energy and allies are placed.

When another player is attacking, the defending play usually starts defending in their green zone. He or she does this by flipping over a card into the zone. If the card is a strike with sufficient intercept, and the player pays the energy cost, this initiates a counterattack. If the revealed card is an advantage or ally, it too may be placed in the appropriate area after the cost is paid. If the player cannot pay the cost, or the card cannot be played at the current time, the player can choose to focus the card and store it face down as stored energy. When an attack is not stopped, it continues through to the next zone, where the player again flips over a card and has a chance to take an action. If the player is already in the red zone when this occurs, the opponent scores a point and may celebrate.

=== Signature moves ===
If all of a given player's zones have become charged, he or she may choose to use a signature move (assuming the energy costs can be paid). To do so, the player uncharges the zones and reveals the signature strike hidden within his or her Chamber card.

All signature move cards have two different moves, one on the front, and one on the back. The Chamber card always begin with the weaker, front-facing move ready to be used. After a signature move is played, it is flipped over before being placed back into the Chamber card, so that the opposite move is used the next time it is activated.

== Deck requirements ==
In order to be a legal QuickStrike play deck, a deck must have at least 60 cards, with no more than four copies of any given card.

Players must also select a Chamber card, and this then restricts what other cards can go into the deck. Chamber cards have certain trait symbols on them, and any cards put into the play deck must match at least one of these trait symbols. This guarantees that cards are compatible in terms of powers. Cards which don't have any trait symbols can be used in any deck.

Each Chamber Card has four symbols that explain which cards they can use: One symbol for strikes, one for advantages, one for allies, and a second for strikes that is specific to that set.

=== Strike Types ===
- Bull - Bull strike cards represent an aggressive and offensive style of fighting. They generally are powerful but costly, taking risks and using resources to attempt to win through sheer force and the elimination of the opponent's cards.
- Fox - Fox strike cards represent tricky and cunning moves. They attempt to win through long-term strategy, and have such effects as searching through one's top cards or deck or forcing tough decisions upon your opponent.
- Lion - Lion cards represent a controlled or defensive style of combat. They allow the player to protect their own work, preventing their allies or energies from being eliminated or their zones from being uncharged. They attempt to win through building themselves up to something big without allowing themselves to be torn back down.

=== Advantage Types ===
- Body - Body cards are no-nonsense advantages that generally give simple but valuable boosts or hindrances to one of the players. They represent characters who are more physical than they are mental or spiritual.
- Mind - Mind cards are strategic advantages. They commonly allow the player to see the next card in one or both of the player's decks and sometimes manipulate their order. They represent characters who can plan ahead and outwit their opponent.
- Spirit - Spirit cards deal the most with the manipulation of energy and the charging/uncharging of zones. They also commonly have effects that depend on what your opponent does, making them the cards that depend most on "luck" or "faith", as the Spirit concept represents.

=== Ally Types ===
- Light - Light characters are those on the side of good and justice. Such characters include Avatar Aang, King Bumi, and Commodore Norrington.
- Shadow - Shadow characters are those whose alignment might be in question, somewhere between good and evil, or perhaps someone who just prefers their freedom as opposed to the law. Such characters include Captain Jack Sparrow, Will Turner, and Prince Zuko
- Dark - Dark characters are those on the side of evil and corruption. Such characters include Admiral Zhao (ranked Commander Zhao in the game) and Captain Barbossa

=== Set-Specific Strikes ===
- Avatar: The Last Airbender Icons - Fire, Water, Earth, Air
- Pirates of the Caribbean Icons - Sail, Sword, Cannon

Starter decks sold for the various game sets typically contain only 30 cards per player, and so are not strictly speaking fully legal decks.

== Games using QuickStrike ==
The following games make use of the QuickStrike system:

- Avatar: The Last Airbender
- Pirates of the Caribbean
- Shaman King Game

== Notes ==
- While Shaman King was not an official QuickStrike game, it is, technically, the first card game to use the system. It was most likely not counted as part of the set due to it being a failure, despite winning many awards from anime magazines.
