= BL Publishing =

Tabletop game publisher

BL Publishing was a division of Games Workshop, and was split into three sections:

- The Black Library publishes novels, art books, background books and graphic novels set in the Warhammer Fantasy world and the Warhammer 40,000 universe. Black Library is now a separate division of Games Workshop, and the only former BL Publishing division still in existence.
- Black Flame published science fiction and horror novels based on licensed third party intellectual property. It was disbanded in 2008.
- Warhammer Historical Wargames published historical wargames including Warhammer Ancient Battles. It was disbanded in November 2010.

Solaris Books, founded in Spring 2007 as an imprint of BL Publishing, focussing on original works of science fiction and fantasy, was acquired in September 2009 by Rebellion Developments for an undisclosed sum.

Also associated with BL Publishing:

- Warp Artefacts - This used to be the imprint of BL Publishing that marketed official artefacts from the worlds of Warhammer and Warhammer 40,000; including art prints, clothing and life sized replicas of Warhammer items. Early 2006 they were brought closer to Black Library under the banner of BL Merchandise.
- Sabertooth Games - was responsible for Collectable Games, including a number of different Collectible card games and Collectible miniatures games. Sabertooth and BLP were both parts of what was known organisationally inside GW as the Entertainment & Media Division (EMD). Sabertooth handled hobby sales of BLP titles in the US and Canada, and vice versa was true in Europe through BLP. It was disbanded in 2008.
- Black Industries was Games Workshop's role-playing game imprint. They marketed the second edition of Warhammer Fantasy Roleplay and (for a short time) Dark Heresy, based in the Warhammer 40,000 universe.

== Sabertooth Games ==
Sabertooth Games
- Company type: Private
- Industry: Collectible card game
- Founded: 2001
- Headquarters: Memphis, Tennessee, USA
- Number of employees: ~20
- Parent: Games Workshop
- Website: http://wayback.vefsafn.is/wayback/20061123074833/http%3A//sabertoothgames.com/stg/

Sabertooth Games (STG) was a Memphis, Tennessee-based game company, founded in 2001. The company primarily produced collectible card games as a subsidiary of Games Workshop, PLC. Sabertooth Games was considered a "sister company" of the other divisions in BL Publishing.

=== Background ===
Sabertooth Games was a small company which primarily targeted hobby stores, rather than attempting to sell through standard mass-market channels. The company's mission statement from CEO Stephen Horvath emphasizes that this focus benefited and helped to support such smaller retailers. In an interview with GameSpy, Horvath notes that the company encourages players to "buy the game where you play the game." Towards this end, the company often sponsors events and provides free promotional cards at local stores.

The games produced by Sabertooth Games made use of existing game licenses or intellectual property. Traditionally, these games were based on other board game or role-playing game properties, such as the Warhammer 40,000 universe. However, with the introduction of the Universal Fighting System in 2006, the company expanded into the area of video game properties, partnering with Capcom, Namco, and others.

In early 2008, following the financial difficulties of Games Workshop, a number of Sabertooth Games' assets, including the Universal Fighting System, were sold to Fantasy Flight Games, along with licenses for board games.

=== Games ===
The company produced and sold the following collectible card game products:

- Warhammer 40,000 Collectible Card Game
- Horus Heresy
- Dark Millennium
- Universal Fighting System
- WarCry

Each of these products includes several different sets or expansions, and new expansions continued to be released on an ongoing basis (for at least several of these) in order to maintain consumer interest. Previously published games which are now out-of-print include Horus Heresy and the Warhammer 40,000 Collectible Card Game.

== See also ==
- Horus Heresy
- Warhammer Fantasy (setting)
