= Rifts Collectible Card Game =

RIFTS Collectible Card Game
- Publishers: Precedence
- Players: 2 or more
- Setup time: < 5 minutes
- Playing time: < 60 minutes

RIFTS Collectible Card Game is an out-of-print collectible card game released in September 2001.

== Gameplay ==
Rifts was based on the role-playing game. The core set had 286 cards with an additional 38 fixed cards released in a starter box format designed to sit on a bookshelf next to the RPG. The fixed cards had different stats than the booster pack versions. Two additional promo cards were also available and their names were homages to Diamond Comic Distributors and Gilbert Gottfried. The game is set 300 years in the future where dimensional anomalies called "rifts" have beset the world and through which aliens, demons, gods, and magical forces invade Earth. Each player adopts the role of a post-holocaust nation such as CyberWorks or the Tolkeen. The game is played so that the first person to run out of cards, loses the game.

== Publication history ==
Rifts was one of the last games made by Precedence. Precedence spent more time developing this game than any other.

The game included artwork by Mark Evans, among others, that creator Kevin Siembieda's had a desire to reprint in an art book. It featured characters such as Fury Iron Juggernaut, General Ross Underhill, and King Victor Macklin. Eventually, the artwork was republished in the RIFTS Ultimate Edition RPG book. The book reproduced approximately 75 images from the CCG.

== Reception ==
John Jackson Miller said that "One of the last games produced by Precedence, Rifts is the one it spent the most energy developing, by far. Long before the game hit the streets, the firm was attending conventions with the preliminary art. And what art! The effort to make this set sizzle shows with almost every card. The monsters are terrifying. The heroes are dynamically heroic. The biggest pain in the neck with the starter box is that it was designed to sit on a shop bookshelf next to the Rifts RPG. It's shaped and sized like a hardcover game book. Not exactly portable. Collectors should be aware that there are several cards fixed in the starters that have been redesigned to help you learn the game. Their regular booster versions have different stats, costs, and abilities that players will need to keep track of."

According to author Jane Frank, players thought the game artwork and game detail were excellent.

The Breaking Dads podcast reviewed the game and noted the company was hosting organized play events and gave retail support, when publisher support for the game immediately ceased as the company went out of business. They also remarked you couldn't play the full game with the starter packs alone but rather a "dumbed down" version of the game. Essentially, the game suffered from lack of expansions and felt "too basic", though they did mention the designer in an archived listserv addressed cards like Counter Attack, Event cards, as well as, adding new factions in future expansions.

== Reviews ==
- Syfy
