= Warhammer: Battle for Atluma =

2006 video game

- Developer: JV Games
- Publisher: Namco Bandai Games
- Series: Warhammer Fantasy
- Platform: PlayStation Portable
- Release: NA: November 14, 2006
- Genre: Collectible card game
- Modes: Single-player, multiplayer

Warhammer: Battle for Atluma is a video game adaptation of the WarCry collectible card game for the PSP.

== Reception ==
Reception

Aggregate score
Aggregator	Score
Metacritic	55/100

Review scores
Publication	Score
GameSpot	5.5/10
GameSpy	2/5
GamesRadar+	2.5/5
GameZone	5/10
IGN	6/10

Warhammer: Battle for Atluma received "mixed or average" reviews, according to review aggregator Metacritic.

IGN found problems with the game's severely minimalistic presentation that "...[didn't] use the power of the PSP at all" and called the title "...a very bare-bones experience." GameSpot praised the solid translation of the Warhammer Warcry game mechanics while criticizing the dull presentation, hard-to-read cards, and lack of sorting and filtering options available for the player's deck. GameSpy called the CCG mechanics decent and panned the weak single-player campaign mode and bad presentation. GameZone gave the game 5 out of 10 and wrote, "Battle for Atluma is a good package for any lover of the card game, but it doesn't offer anything special to draw outsiders into the experience." GamesRadar+ cited the accessibility, custom decks, and campaign mode as positives while taking issue with the lack of Warhammer aesthetics, simplistic gameplay, and card text readability issues.
