= Serenades: The First Book of Powers =

Serenades: The First Book of Powers is a 1996 role-playing game supplement published by Precedence Publishing for Immortal: The Invisible War.

== Contents ==
Serenades: The First Book of Powers is a supplement in which a comprehensive look is offered at the mystical abilities available to immortal characters. The book is divided into three main sections: revised mechanics for using powers, general abilities accessible to all immortals (called Vogues), and faction-specific powers tied to the 13 immortal Prides (covered in Secrets). The revised rules address complex scenarios like targeting multiple foes and resisting effects. It includes over 75 new powers and a framework for their use.

== Reception ==
Andy Butcher reviewed Serenades: The First Book of Powers for Arcane magazine, rating it an 8 out of 10 overall, and stated that "Along with the excellent presentation, this is a valuable addition to any Immortal referee's collection, expanding the options open to players and NPC immortals alike."

== Reviews ==
- Dragon #239 (Sept., 1997)
