= Immortal Pilot Pack =

Artwork on the central panel of the included gamemaster's screen, 1994

Immortal Pilot Pack is a supplement published by Precedence Publishing in 1994 for the fantasy role-playing game Immortal: The Invisible War.

== Contents ==
Immortal Pilot Pack includes

- a 32-page booklet that includes an introductory adventure, "Project Looking Glass"
- a 3-panel gamemaster's screen
- 12 blank character sheets

== Publication history ==
Precedence Publishing produced the Immortal: The Invisible War role-playing game in 1994, and followed this with Immortal Pilot Pack the same year. The 32-page booklet in the pack was designed by Paul W. Brown III, David Hewitt, Randy L. Lindsay, and Breanna Van Gries, with interior art by Ran Ackels, and cover art by Kane Clevenger.

== Reception ==
In the September 1996 edition of Dragon (Issue #233), Rick Swan thought the included adventure, Project Looking Glass, was far better than the adventure in the original Immortal: The Invisible War rulebook, commenting that the adventure in this supplement was "a detailed scenario that not only serves up a fair number of surprises but also teaches the rules to new players." He concluded by giving this supplement a very good rating of 5 out of 6, saying, "Bundled with a gamemaster screen and a pack of character sheets, it's also a pretty good buy."

== Reviews ==
- Australian Realms #22
