= Dracul Source Book =

Dracul Source Book is a 1996 role-playing game supplement published by Precedence Entertainment for Immortal: The Invisible War.

== Contents ==
Dracul Source Book is a supplement in which Pride Dracul is covered, whose members are tied to Eastern and South American cultures, often appearing in human form as people native to those regions. Opening with a fictional narrative to set the tone, the sourcebook delves into the Pride's elaborate history and unique traits. It offers details on the Dracul Dynasties—their noble houses and lineages—and outlines varied character paths through "Callings." It also introduces "Quiet Cultures," which represent servant races, and touches on enemies and secret refuges known as Mantles. Supporting materials include a timeline of Dracul's evolution, descriptions of specialized abilities, a glossary for in-universe terminology, and a curated list of background readings.

== Publication history ==
Dracul Source Book marks the first installment in a series of Pride Books that spotlight distinct immortal factions.

== Reception ==
Andy Butcher reviewed Dracul Source Book for Arcane magazine, rating it a 7 out of 10 overall, and stated that "The Dracul Source Book displays the same depth and imagination as previous releases in the Immortal line, and is just as well put together. The text mixes fictional accounts with explanations and mechanics, which goes a long way towards creating the right atmosphere."
