= Avatar: The Last Airbender Trading Card Game =

2006 collectible card game

- Publishers: Upper Deck Company
- Publication: February 2006; 20 years ago
- Players: 2
- Playing time: ~1 and a half hours
- Skills: Card playing Arithmetic; Basic Reading Ability

Avatar: The Last Airbender Trading Card Game is an out-of-print collectible card game based on the Nickelodeon animated television series Avatar: The Last Airbender. Upper Deck Entertainment launched this title in the first quarter of 2006.

== Game overview ==
Players take on the role of characters from the television series, dueling each other in a contest of strength and ability. For example, one player might play as Katara, battling against another player playing as Uncle Iroh. The objective is to be the first to score three points, earned when opponents are forced back into their red zone with no further actions available to them.

== Game system ==
The gaming system used for this title is known as the QuickStrike system. The intent of having such a system is so that a number of different games (based on different intellectual property) can be made compatible with each other. This allows cards from different fictional universes to compete and interact. There are now a number of card games making use of a similar approach, e.g. the Universal Fighting System from Sabertooth Games.

Avatar: The Last Airbender Trading Card Game is the second game to make use of the QuickStrike system, with the first property being the Shaman King Trading Card Game and the third the Pirates of the Caribbean Trading Card Game.

== Card sets and products ==
The initial release for Avatar: The Last Airbender, titled Master of Elements, contains 235 cards total – 85 common cards, 75 uncommon cards, 65 rare cards, and 10 super-rare Zenementals cards. Of these 235 cards, 60 are Chamber cards: 30 common cards, 20 uncommon cards, and 10 rare cards. All Master of Elements cards can be identified by the code AME (Avatar Master of Elements), which appears immediately before the number on each card.

The Master of Elements two-player starter set includes 60 playing cards, 2 Chamber cards, a rule book, a pair of playmats, and a plastic carrying case. Booster packs contain 10 cards, typically distributed as 5 commons, 3 uncommons, 1 rare, and 1 Chamber card. There is a 1 in 6 chance that one of the cards in the booster will be replaced with a super-rare Zenementals foil card instead.

Additionally, a number of promo cards have been released. The first pressings of Volume 1 and 2 of Avatar on DVD contain exclusive promotional cards. These cards can be identified by the code APR (Avatar PRomo). Promotional cards can also be obtained through other means. This includes 8 cards which are available as a result of a Burger King cross-promotion; such cards are marked with the code ABK (Avatar Burger King).

A second Avatar: The Last Airbender set titled Path to Enlightenment was to come out later, but the line was discontinued and the set never came out.

== Characters additions ==
The Avatar: The Last Airbender TCG features four Chamber Card characters that are not considered canon and did not appear in the show, despite the claims of packaging:

=== Afiko the Betrayer ===
Afiko, an elder Airbender monk of the Southern Air Temple, grew jealous when his peers announced Aang's identity as the Avatar. Envious, he turned traitor and revealed the temple's location to the Fire Nation. They stormed the temple and slaughtered the other monks, but were too late to catch Aang, who had run away from home shortly before. Afiko was instrumental in engineering the genocide of his fellow Air Nomads, earning a place as Fire Lord Sozin's close adviser. He also seems to have aided Sozin in attacking the Earth Kingdom because he is often shown blocking or dispersing Earthbending attacks and attacking Earthbenders. The traitorous monk died long before Aang's return, and the subsequent undermining of all Afiko's work. In the end, despite his loyalty and achievements towards the Fire Nation, history records indicate that Afiko met his demise in the War's fifth year, when Fire Lord Sozin had him executed as a traitor.

=== Jojo the Kissing Bandit ===
Jojo, the Kissing Bandit is the Earth Kingdom's own famous female Robin Hood. A gentlewoman thief and Earthbender (seen in Avatar Trading Cards), this crafty young Earthbender's trademark is the red-lipstick kiss she leaves on her male victims. Her fame and relatively benign modus operandi leaves Earth Kingdom authorities tolerant, while some even fantasize about being her victim. She has also stolen from the Fire Nation, as she is often shown blocking Firebending attacks and using Earthbending to attack Fire Nation soldiers. Jojo has recently developed a crush on fellow fugitive Aang, from seeing his wanted posters. Jojo the Kissing Bandit is also seen attacking the Cabbage Merchant and evading a water whip attack from Katara, whom she seems to have been stealing from.

=== Kinto the Waterbender ===
Kinto the Waterbender, originally of the North Pole's Northern Water Tribe, is a world traveller and a chronic practical joker who plays tricks on his friends, sometimes to the point of alienation. Kinto is known to be a big showoff. Never settling down for long, his ambition is to see the whole world.

In the game, Kinto is considered a Dark character, and is known for using painful or cruel waterbending techniques, such as daggers of ice or manipulating the water in one's stomach. Many of his pictures show him as being an enemy to Aang and his gang such as one displaying Aang trapped in a ball of water, another showing Kinto trying to cause a tidal wave on top of the gang riding Appa and one with Kinto and Sokka battling (and Kinto apparently triumphing).

=== Malu the Ghost Witch ===
Malu, the Ghost Witch of the Mountain, arose as a figure of Earth Kingdom legend in the years following the Fire Nation's first strikes. An enigmatic beauty who supposedly controlled the spirits, and seemingly vanished and appeared at will, Malu was truly an Airbender, whose mother hid her in a mountain cave to escape the Fire Nation's storming of the Eastern Air Temple. Her parents were Airbender monks and some of the war's first casualties. For years, she lived a solitary existence in the forest, but ten years into the war, she began attacking Fire Nation soldiers. Some say she still makes her home in the mountain passes.

"Malu" is also the Malay word for shyness, which would fit her rather elusive nature.
