= Invisible War (disambiguation) =

The Invisible War is a 2012 documentary film.

Invisible War may also refer to:

- Deus Ex: Invisible War, a 2003 video game
- Immortal: The Invisible War, a 1993 role-playing game
