= Score Entertainment =

Former American trading card company

The Score Entertainment logo

Score Entertainment was a trading card design and manufacturing company based in Arlington, Texas. Their first card game was the Dragon Ball Z: Collectible Card Game in 2000. Score Entertainment was a member of the Donruss Playoff LP family of companies. Donruss Playoff LP was bought out in early 2009 by Panini America and Score Entertainment was closed down.

== Trading cards and games ==
As with several other companies in the trading card and collectible card game industries, Score Entertainment licensed popular intellectual properties for their games and trading cards. These are drawn from a variety of television programs, animated series, and video games. Their game properties included the following:

- Bleach Trading Card Game
- Buffy the Vampire Slayer Collectible Card Game
- Case Closed Trading Card Game
- Dragon Ball GT Trading Card Game
- Dragon Ball Z Collectible Card Game
- Dragon Ball Z Trading Card Game
- Dragon Booster Trading Card Game
- Fruits Basket: Friends of the Zodiac Card Game
- InuYasha Trading Card Game
- Sonic X Trading Card Game
- Yu Yu Hakusho Trading Card Game

The company was also responsible for the Epic Battles Trading Card Game, as well as the newer Afterworld game.

== See also ==
- Panini America
- Dragon Ball Z Collectible Card Game
- Bleach Trading Card Game
- Yu Yu Hakusho Trading Card Game
- Buffy the Vampire Slayer Collectible Card Game
- Dragon Booster Trading Card Game
