= Warhammer 40,000 Collectible Card Game =

Collectible card game

Warhammer 40,000
- Card back of the Warhammer 40K CCG.
- Designers: Luke Peterschmidt and Ryan Miller
- Publishers: Sabertooth Games
- Players: 2
- Playing time: Approx 45 min
- Chance: Some
- Age range: 10+
- Skills: Card playing Arithmetic; Basic Reading Ability

Warhammer 40,000 Collectible Card Game, sometimes denoted WH40KCCG is an out-of-print collectible card game released in 2001 by Sabertooth Games. It had five expansions, the last of which was printed in early 2003. It is set in the fictional Warhammer 40,000 universe. The players may select various factions around which they could base their personalized deck. These factions include Orks, Space Marines, Chaos, Eldar, Tyranids, Imperial Guard, and Dark Eldar; there were also sub-factions (such as individual Space Marines chapters).

Sabretooth game later released semi-compatible games set in the same universe, Horus Heresy and Dark Millennium.

== Expansions ==
- Siege of Malogrim Hive (January 2003)
- Invasion: Verdicon (November 2002)
- Battle for Delos V (July 2002)
- Coronis Campaign (April 2002)
- Battle for Pandora Prime (October 2001)

== Factions ==
- Chaos
- Dark Eldar
- Eldar
- Imperial Guard
  - Gantor
  - Ork Hunters
  - Rubber Suit
- Space Marines
  - Blood Angels
  - Dark Angels
  - Space Wolves
- Ork
- Tyranid
  - Arachnia

Inclusion of Factions by Expansion [WIP]
| Faction | Siege of Malogrim Hive | Invasion: Verdicon | Battle for Delos V | Coronis Campaign | Battle for Pandora Prime |
|---|---|---|---|---|---|
| Chaos | Yes | No | Yes | No | No |
| Dark Eldar | Yes | No | Yes | No | Yes |
| Eldar | No | Yes | No | No | No |
| Imperial Guard | No | Yes | No | Yes | No |
| Gantor | No | No | No | No | No |
| Ork Hunters | No | No | No | No | No |
| Rubber Suit | No | No | No | No | No |
| Space Marines | Yes* | Yes* | No | No | Yes |
| Blood Angels | Yes | No | No | No | No |
| Dark Angels | No | Yes | No | No | No |
| Space Wolves | No | No | Yes | No | No |
| Ork | Yes | No | Yes | No | Yes |
| Tyranid | No | Yes | No | Yes | No |
| Arachnia | No | No | No | No | No |
