= The Terminator Collectible Card Game =

Collectible card game

- Card back to the Terminator CCG.
- Publishers: Precedence
- Players: 2 or more
- Setup time: < 5 minutes
- Playing time: < 60 minutes

The Terminator Collectible Card Game is an out-of-print collectible card game by Precedence based on the 1984 movie of the same name. It was released in October 2000. The first and only set had 349 cards, although others claim 348 for a missing Extrapolate card. The game was cancelled one year before Precedence closed as a company.

The game closely resembles Aliens Predator Customizable Card Game and is compatible. The game was said to have a role-playing feel as characters search for equipment, look for chances to attack, and comb the streets for characters important to the future. Gameplay involves one player assuming the role of Skynet trying to eliminate the other player who plays as the human Resistance. Players take turns by playing Location cards where they play Character cards. A player may win in one of three ways: eliminating all of an opponent's main characters, fulfilling 10 Mission Points from Mission cards, or safeguarding or eliminating 10 Importance points worth of supporting characters.

The game was criticized because in tournaments players would have to maintain two decks, one for Skynet and one for the Resistance.

== Reviews ==
- Syfy
