= Dragon Booster Trading Card Game =

Collectible trading card game

- Sample Dragon Booster Trading card
- Designers: David Eckhard
- Publishers: Score Entertainment
- Players: 2+
- Playing time: Approx 30 min
- Chance: Some
- Age range: 10+
- Skills: Card playing Arithmetic; Basic Reading Ability

The Dragon Booster Trading Card Game is an out-of-print collectible trading card game based on the animated television series Dragon Booster. The initial card set, Release the Dragon, was released in February 2005 by Score Entertainment.

== Game summary ==
Two or more players attempt to win a high speed dragon race by either being the first to cross the finish line (of 30 points), or by completely exhausting (emptying) the decks of all rivals.

Each player needs two decks, a race deck, and a dragon deck. The race deck is the normal deck from which cards are drawn, while the dragon deck is a pool of cards from which cards can be selected as needed during play.

== Play sequence ==
Turns consist of a number of steps, with each player acting in each step. The player who is the leader for a given turn acts first during a given step, with other players acting afterwards in a clockwise order. The following are the steps which make up a turn:

1. Draw - Each player draws 2 cards from his or her race deck.
2. Gear Up - Each player must either "mag a gear" (attach a piece of equipment) onto his or her dragon, or recruit a crew member. Players choose the card from their dragon deck, rather than drawing it at random.
3. Main - Players gain energy and perform actions and maneuvers. The amount of energy gained is equal to the turn number (e.g. 2 energy on turn #2), and does not carry over from turn to turn.
4. Rush - Players select one or more of their maneuvers to be moved into the zone, after which players battle it out. When battles resolve, players can earn 0 or more points towards victory.

After all steps of a turn complete, the player sitting clockwise from the leader automatically becomes the new leader for the following turn.

== Deck composition ==
The race deck must contain exactly 60 cards, with no more than 4 copies of any given event or maneuver. The dragon deck is made up of dragon cards, crew cards, and gear cards. It must contain at least 1 dragon, and can have no more than 2 copies of any particular card, with a maximum of 10 cards total.

== Products ==
Starter decks contain 60 random cards (39 commons, 18 uncommons, and 3 rares), as well as a demo pack made up of 13 additional cards. The package also includes a Dragon Pack containing a plastic dragon card plus 4 cards of gear/crew, a playmat, and a rulebook. Booster packs contain 10 cards, made up of 5 commons, 3 uncommons, 1 rare, and 1 plastic dragon/gear/crew card. On average, 1 out of every 3 booster packs contains a foil card.
