= Bleach Trading Card Game =

Out of print card game based on Bleach

- The card back to Bleach TCG
- Designers: Aik Tongtharadol
- Publishers: Score Entertainment
- Players: 2
- Playing time: Depends
- Chance: Some
- Skills: Card playing Arithmetic; Basic Reading Ability, good sportsmanship, luck.

The Bleach Trading Card Game is an out-of-print collectible card game from Score Entertainment, and is based on the manga and anime series of the same name. The game received a nomination for Origin's "Game of the Year" and earned a semi-finalist position.

== Overview ==
The Bleach Trading Card Game is played with two people. Each player must have a total of at least eighty-one cards: a Guardian card, a sixty-card 'main deck' and a twenty-card side deck consisting of energy cards determined by the Guardian card. Later expansions allow energy cards to be replaced by other cards in the side deck. There are two ways to win: by reducing an opponent's power (printed on their Guardian card) to zero, or if an opponent is unable to draw or discard a card from their deck.

A standard player's turn in the game consists of three steps: The Resource Step, the Main Step and the End Step. The Resource Step has the player drawing cards and putting Energy cards into play, the Main Step is where a player may attack and play cards other than Energy cards, and the End Step is a formal conclusion to the turn.

== Card types ==
There are six different types of cards in the Bleach Trading Card Game:

- **Guardian** cards represent the personas of characters in the Bleach universe. Each Guardian has a Power rating that represents the total amount of damage they can take. Each Guardian also has a set of numbers on the left side of the card that represent how much of a particular Energy card that the Guardian can have in their energy deck. Finally, Guardians each have Effects that can be used as indicated on the card. (Effects that require a cost will have the requirements bolded)
  - In addition to regular versions, there are also special Hi-Tech cards that are variants of the regular Guardian cards. In the sets that included starter decks (Premiere and Bankai) there were two Hi-Tech cards per starter, randomly inserted; in other sets they could be obtained through the Urahara Shop. 2 variations of most Hi-Techs exist with a limited few having 3 or possibly 4 (Normal, All have black variant; Set 1 (HT1-HT8) all have Red Tint Variant; Ichigo, Yoruichi, Renji, and Toshiro each have Alt.Art variants [DB1-DB4, respectively].) Black variants have card numbers beginning with the letters BP; red variants have numbers that begin with T; the four listed alternate art variants were distributed with the Deck Boxes for the Seireitei expansion, and their card numbers begin with DB. All variants other than the DB variants are Promotional cards.)
- **Energy** cards were the only cards that could be placed in the Side Deck up until the release of the Bankai Expansion, which now allows them to be switched with other cards at a 1 for 1 ratio. Energy cards are what players use to pay costs and play their cards. There are currently three kinds of Energy: Mind Energy, Body Energy and Spirit Energy. The Bounts expansion included Dual Energy cards, which produce either of two types of energy: they are limited to one card of each type per deck.
- **Character** cards can represent anyone and anything from Bleach, whether it be Humans, Soul Reapers or Hollows. Character cards (and the three other types of cards) have a Cost that needs to be paid upon playing the card. Characters also have Traits, which are keywords that determine if specific abilities can be used. Some characters may also be labeled Non-Unique, which means you can have more than one copy in play at any time. The most important area of a Character card is the right side of the card. Each Character can have up to three Stats which they use to attack and inflict Power damage to the opponent. Some Characters may also have Effects. Characters have a White or Black background.
  - There are currently fifteen different Character traits: Good, Human, Male, Evil, Student, Soldier, Soul Reaper, Spirit, Hollow, Whole, Female, Quincy, Cute, Animal, and Bankai.
  - There are currently six stats that Characters can use: **AGI** (Agility), **FOR** (Fortitude), **INT** (Intelligence), **SPP** (Spiritual Pressure), **STR** (Strength) and **QCK** (Quickness).
- **Events** have a number of varying abilities. Some Events may require you to have Characters with certain Traits in play in order to use them. New events were released in the Bankai Expansion that are listed as "Bankai" and attach to Guardians. Events have a Blue background.
- **Items** need to be equipped to Characters in order to be used, and can represent important items in the Bleach universe (such as Zanpakutō). Items may need to be equipped to a certain Character or someone with a certain Trait in order to use them. Items have a Red background.
- **Battlegrounds** represent locations in the Anime. They have a constant effect that can affect either one or all players. Battlegrounds have a Green background.

== Turn progression ==
=== Resource Step ===
Cards are returned from depleted (sideways) back to upright positions. The active player draws a card from their deck, then may choose whether to draw another card or place a card from their side deck in play, then may choose whether to draw yet another card or place another energy card into play.

=== Main Step ===
The active player may play any card from his hand, use powers on cards in play, or attack with characters. These can be done in any order, as long as the player has the cards to do so.

- Using Powers: Certain cards have special powers listed on the cards. Along with the effect, it also states the cost(s) or times the effect can be used.
- Attacking: To attack, you must first choose a card to attack with, and then the stat which you will use. Once you decide that, your opponent must choose what card they choose to defend with. Both players then choose cards with which to boost the selected stat. You boost by discarding cards with the corresponding stat in the top right corner by the number in the top right corner of the card you are discarding. Both players then add up how high the stat selected by the attacker got, and compare the values. From there, three cases can occur:

1. The Attacker beats the Defender. The defender is destroyed and the defending guardian takes damage equal to the difference.

2. The Attacker ties the Defender. Both cards are destroyed. No damage is taken.

3. The Defender beats the Attacker. The attacking card is destroyed, but no damage is dealt.

- Playing Cards: Cards can be played by using energy cards stored on the field corresponding to the symbols of the cards on the left-hand side of the card. Different cards have different values for their use.

=== End Step ===
The formal end of a turn. Temporary effects are ended, and control is switched over to another player.

== Card sets and release information ==
Demo decks can be found in issue #43 of Anime Insider and a video demo can be found on YouTube as well as the game's website. The promotional pack includes a card which lists the card order for the pack, and a playmat which is not available elsewhere. Cards were sold in 72-card preconstructed starter decks which include 2 booster packs, 10-card booster packs, and 12-pack booster boxes. Promotional ("promo") cards were available through mail-in credits from Score, at tournaments, and at conventions. The releases are as follows:

- Premiere Set - Released May 2007: 250+ card set including 8 Hi-Tech Guardian cards and 25 promotional cards (two HT cards per starter deck; the playmat included with the starter decks lists all the cards in this set except the promotional cards);
- Soul Society - Released August 2007: 110 card set + 10 card Soul Reaper Subset (SSB 1-10) and 10 promotional cards (P26-P35);
- Seireitei - Releases November 14, 2007: 110 card set + 10 card Soul Reaper Subset (SSB11-20) and 14 promotional cards (P36-P49);
- Bankai - Released April 2008: 280+ card set including 2 Hi-Tech Dual Guardian cards, 6 Hi-Tech Guardian cards, 13 subset cards (SSB 21-33), 21 promotional cards (P50-P70), and 14 Echo Autographed cards (all variants of Character cards from this expansion). The playmat included with the starter decks lists all the cards in the set except the promotional cards;
- Bounts - Released July 2008: 195 cards (60 commons, 50 uncommons, 50 rares, 2 ultra rares, 10 echo autograph cards [all variants of Guardian cards, A15-A24], 10 subset cards [OPN 1-10], and 13 promo cards[P71-P83]).
- Portal - Released December 2008: 162 card base set (60 commons, 50 uncommons, 50 rares, 2 ultra-rares); 24 subset cards (MON 1-24, where MON stands for "Memories of Nobody", the title of the first theatrical movie from the series), 10 Echo autograph cards (all Guardians, A25-A34) and 12 promotional cards (P84-P95).

Each set included (one per booster) extra, larger cards most of which fit together to form a nine-card poster. These also helped protect the edges of the playable cards in the booster. The bottom middle card from the Seireitei set was omitted from boosters for the Seireitei set; the cards were added to the extra cards in the Bankai set.

The game ceased publication April 2009, just before the planned launch of its seventh expansion, Bleach Infiltration. This cancellation was attributed to the ongoing recession, which heavily affected TCG sales.

== Japanese version ==
The Japanese version of this game shares only a few things in common with the English version. One being, Bleach itself and the other is that every card has a boost power. Score Entertainment assures its fans that the English Bleach TCG is its own game; not a direct copy of the Japanese version.
