= Aliens Predator Customizable Card Game =

Collectible card game

- Aliens Predator Customizable Card Game card back
- Designers: Ran Ackels, David Hewitt, Paul Brown, and John Myler
- Publishers: Precedence Entertainment and Harper Prism
- Players: 2 or more
- Setup time: 5-10 minutes
- Playing time: variable
- Chance: Some
- Skills: Card playing Arithmetic

Aliens Predator Customizable Card Game is a three-player collectible card game (CCG) that was published in 1997. It was considered one of the more successful CCGs during the late 1990s and was Harper Prism's first foray into the CCG market.

== Publication history ==
Based on the Alien vs. Predator franchise created in the 1990s, Aliens Predator Customizable Card Game was published by Precedence Entertainment and Harper Prism. Card art featured photographic stills from the film franchise. The 363-card set was sold in three 60-card starter decks (focused on one of Alien, Predator, and Marine players) having 50 fixed cards and 10 random rare and uncommon cards, and in 15-card booster packs.

The expansion set Alien Resurrection based on the film of the same name was planned for early 1998, focusing on the Marines. It was delayed as the company was acquiring rights for the use of actor's likenesses for the photograph still images from the film, which they had cleared by October 1998. The set was produced using "a full library of film stills", instead of the grainier publicity photographs used in the original set.

By August 1998, there were plans for three expansion sets. Development of the second set, named Atmosphere, was completed in March 1999 and focused on the film Predator. The third set, Cityscape, was based on the subsequent film Predator 2.

== Gameplay ==
This is a three-player game. Each player, equipped with a game deck, takes on the role of either the Alien, the Predator or a Colonial Marine. Each role has slightly different rules which lead to different strategies. Each player plays location cards, then moves from card to card, using decoy tokens to hide real movement. When each location is searched, character and equipment cards can be played to give in-game advantages. When two players meet in the same location, combat is resolved with a six-sided die.

== Reception ==
In the March 1998 edition of Dragon (Issue #245), Allen Varney found the game to be "exciting... easy to learn, flexible in its variety of scenarios, and fast playing." Varney concluded that it was an "endlessly replayable, adrenaline-pumping game. Bravo!"

Christopher Wilkie, in a review in the May 1998 issue of The Duelist, stated that the rules were unclear at times, that differentiating between the numbers for power and speed on the cards was difficult, and that the card art is "sub par" and at times blurry. He also stated that the game is easy to learn.

== Reviews ==
- Backstab #8
