= Buffy the Vampire Slayer Collectible Card Game =

Trading card game

- Cardback to the Buffy the Vampire Slayer CCG
- Designers: Chaz Elliott and David Eckhard
- Publishers: Score Entertainment
- Players: 2–10
- Playing time: Approx. 20 min
- Chance: Some
- Age range: 10+
- Skills: Card playing Arithmetic

The Buffy the Vampire Slayer Collectible Card Game is an out-of-print trading card game based on Buffy the Vampire Slayer. It was released in December 2001 by Score Entertainment. As of January 2004, Score Entertainment no longer holds the rights to this game. Hence, no further production runs or expansions for the game are planned.

As of 2006, the game continues to have an active player base. Virtual expansions, or "dream cards" are created and approved by a players committee known as the Watchers Council Association. They are also responsible for worldwide player rankings, current rulings, and tournament organization and support.

== Game summary ==
Players compete to be the first to successfully either earn 10 destiny points, or control Sunnydale Park for 6 turns. Destiny points are earned for winning fights and completing challenges, while control of Sunnydale Park is established by being the only player with characters in the park at the end of a turn.

The game is played as a board game of sorts, using a pair of playmats which represent Sunnydale. Individual spots on the playmat represent different locations, while the middle section (shared by the two players) represents the park. Cards are played to these locations and move around between the locations during the various phases of the game.

== Card types ==
- Essences – Cards representing the main character who has been selected for a given deck. Essence cards are kept to the side to track destiny points.
- Characters – Versions of the main character and supporting characters. Character cards often feature the same character with a different level value (representing a more experienced version of the same individual).
- Challenges – Challenges and trials which can be defeated for destiny points. Heroes and companions can only attempt good challenges, while villains and minions can only attempt evil challenges.
- Locations – The various unique and non-unique locales of Sunnydale. These cards stay in play for the duration of the game at a given square, providing some effect.
- Skills & Items – Talents, abilities, and possessions which provide bonuses to the cards they are attached to. Alternately, these cards can be played from the hand to give a +1 bonus to a talent during a fight or challenge.
- Events – Major incidents or events which are taking place. These cards have an effect and then are immediately discarded. Each specific event can only be played once per game.
- Actions – Cards playing during various steps of the game. They can grant bonuses to talents or otherwise change things at a moment's notice.
- Episodes – Part I and part II of specific episodes from the television show. They heavily influence the overall game, with triggers causing the transition between the first and second parts of the episode.

== Deck composition ==
Decks must be designed as either Hero & Companion decks or Villain & Minion decks. This means, for example, that when the main character is a hero, minions and villains cannot be included in the same deck.

The challenge deck must have exactly 7 different challenges.

The location deck must have 4 to 8 different (non-unique) location cards.

The resource deck must have at least 40 cards (or 60 cards for tournament play). No more than half of the deck can be action cards, and no more than half of the deck can be character decks. There is a limit of 3 of any given card, and only 3 character cards per level per character are permitted (so that one cannot have 4 different level 1 Buffy cards).

Each deck must also have one Hero/Villain Essence Card, along with a corresponding Level 1 character card.

== Card sets ==
The 200-card Buffy the Vampire Slayer Collectible Card Game base set is known as the "Pergamum Prophecy". Two expansions were also produced: Angel's Curse and Class of '99. The former featured cards involving Buffy struggling against her vampiric ex-boyfriend, while the latter introduced "episode cards" to the game system. There are a total of 629 unique cards. A series of themed decks were also produced that were based on the episode "The Wish".

The original set was sold in 60-card hero and villain starter decks, in 12-card booster packs in hobby shops, and in 10-card booster packs in mass retail outlets.
