= Horus Heresy =

Horus Heresy may refer to:

- A fictional civil war within the Imperium of Man in the Warhammer 40,000 universe
- The Horus Heresy, a Warhammer 40,000 novel series
- Horus Heresy (1993 board game), a Warhammer 40,000 board game
- Horus Heresy (2010 board game), a Warhammer 40,000 board game
- Horus Heresy (card game), a Warhammer 40,000 card game
