= Yu Yu Hakusho Trading Card Game =

Japanese anime-related card game

- The card back to Yu Yu Hakusho TCG
- Publishers: Score Entertainment
- Players: 2
- Playing time: Approx 20 min
- Chance: Some
- Skills: Card playing Arithmetic; Basic Reading Ability

The Yu Yu Hakusho Trading Card Game was first published in 2003 by Score Entertainment, and is based on the anime and manga series YuYu Hakusho (the series is spelled Yu Yu Hakusho in FUNimation's anime version and spelled YuYu Hakusho in the Viz English manga). It is a two-player tournament-styled collectible card game; each player uses a deck of forty-four or more cards that is headed by a team of four character cards. The game was discontinued in 2005.

== Expansions ==
Six expansions were released for the Yu Yu Hakusho TCG:

- Base Set
- Dark Tournament
- Gateway
- Exile
- Betrayal
- Alliance

Tournament cards were distributed at tournaments in special packs called spirit packs. Promotional cards could be acquired in many ways: buying magazines or DVDs, or attending tournaments or special events. Alliance did not have any tournament or promotional cards. In addition, special league cards could be acquired by joining a league.

In addition, a "mystery card" called "The Dark One" said to be the ultimate card, was printed. Three copies were initially given to each Score employee (many of which became hole punched). It had an attack of 99000 and the effect "Since you work for Score you can choose a card in your hand or in play and change the effect of the card into anything you want for the remainder of the game." This instantly became one of the most sought after cards in the game when it was first revealed and a sold for over $1,000 on eBay prior to release. This one copy was placed on eBay by Score Entertainment to increase the hype for the upcoming events and tournament prizes, but the card was never widely released to the public as planned due to unforeseen complications. Almost 20 years later, an original copy of "The Dark One" is still widely considered to be the "holy grail" of the Yu Yu Hakusho trading card game and routinely sees sales between $2-$5k when it becomes possible to find one.

In November 2011, the initial Season 4 Blu-ray release by Funimation contained a reprinted, non-foil copy of "The Dark One", printed by Panini, edited to allow use by the casual player.

== Gameplay ==
The game is divided into five matches that consist of one-on-one fights between two character cards. The players alternate turns until one character is defeated, then move on to the next pair of characters. The game ends when one player wins three out of the five matches, or when one player cannot draw or discard a card from their deck. There are also a select few cards that allow one to win the game after performing a set amount of conditions.

=== Card types ===
Characters
Representing characters from the anime and manga, there must be at least four of them in the deck. Four selected cards start on the field while the others (if there are any) stay in the deck. Some characters have a team symbol; if there are at least three characters with the same team symbol on the field, then the player can use a special bonus attributed to that team. Each card has a Defense score, at least one Attack, and an Alignment (Hero or Villain). Some have effects that can be used at various steps.
Techniques
Each Technique card is a single attack that the player's character can use during the Attack step.
Items
Items boost a character's attack or defense power, put the player's opponent at a disadvantage, or aid the player in some other way, such as drawing additional cards or changing the player's characters' positions in the Match Slots.
Events
Representing plot twists in the anime, Event cards perform a wide variety of things. They are played and used during the Main Step, unless stated otherwise on the card.

=== Field ===
The playing field has nine places for cards and a Spirit Energy tracker on each side.

On the leftmost side is the Arena, where the currently fighting Characters are placed opposite each other. Attached Item cards are placed on the lower-left of the Character, and Techniques on the lower-right.

To the right of the Arena are the deck and the discard pile, and placed in a line going left-to-right are the three (or four) other Characters. (This is called the Sideline.) Above the Sideline is the Spirit Energy Tracker, which is simply 0 through 10 printed on the game mat. Included with each Starter Deck is a cardboard counter that is used to mark what level the player's Spirit Energy is, but any sort of counter (coins, pebbles, etc.) can be used.

=== Setup ===
The player and their opponent start the game with zero Spirit Energy. The player selects four characters from their deck and chooses one to place in the Arena section of the field; this one will fight the first match. The other three are placed face-down in a line to the right of the deck and discard, with the character that will fight next leftmost. Once the character cards of both players have been placed, the player turns them all right-side up.

The player should shuffle the deck and place it on the field, then flip a coin to determine who goes first. Both players then draw 4 cards from the top of their decks.

=== Step 1: Draw ===
1. Unless this is the first turn of the game, the player draws two cards.
2. The player gains two Spirit Energy. (The Spirit Energy Tracker is raised by two points.) Spirit Energy can go up to ten, but not above it, and drop to zero (0), but not below it.

Any cards' effects with "Draw:" can be used during this step.

=== Step 2: Main ===
The player may take any of these actions during this step:

- Place a 5th character card from their hand onto the last unoccupied Match Slot. (There are only four Match Slots, so if the player has more than five characters in their deck, they should choose their fifth fighter carefully.)
- Attach an item from their hand to one of their characters.
- Attach a technique from their hand to one of their characters.
- Play an event from their hand.
- Use an effect from a card already in play that can be used during this step. (That is, starts with "Main:")

Alternatively, the player may do nothing at all, and go straight to the Attack step.

If a card the player is attaching to a fighter has one or more Spirit Energy icons on it, then they must spend that number of Spirit Energy and lower their Tracker accordingly. However, when the player attaches a card to a character on the Sideline, they should place it facedown under the character and therefore they will not pay any costs. The only time the player will pay costs is when the attached cards are flipped face-up on either the Sidelines or while entering the Arena. If the costs cannot be paid, the card must be discarded.

=== Step 3: Attack ===
The player uses one attack during this step. Attacks are done in this order, to prevent confusion:

1. The player states which attack their character is using, either from their own card or from an attached Technique, and pay its cost.
2. The player may use cards and effects that have the phrase "when you use an attack" in their text now.
3. If the player's attack has an effect, it is used now.
4. Cards with effects that are prefixed with "Attack:" on them may be used now.
5. The player compares the final Attack and Defense values. If the Attack is equal to or greater than the Defense, then 1 point of damage is dealt. If the Attack is twice the Defense or more, 2 points of damage are dealt instead. Unless stated by a card effect, no more than 2 points of damage can be dealt a turn.
6. If no damage would be dealt, the player may discard 2 cards from their hand in order to deal 1 point of damage.
7. The defender turns the damaged character ninety degrees clockwise for each point of damage. Alternatively when you are healing points of damage, turn the damaged character ninety degrees counter clockwise for every 1 point of damaged healed. You can not make your characters HP higher than four unless specifically stated by a card effect.

Once a character has taken four points of damage (thus returning it to its original position), both fighters are moved off the main playing field, and the winner is placed face-up and the loser face-down. Any cards attached to them are discarded. The next-in-line in the Match Slots are then moved to the Arena, any attached cards are flipped face-up and any costs for those cards are paid now.

== Discontinuation ==
The game, which started in 2003 and ended in 2005, was discontinued for various reasons. One of the reasons was that each subsequent expansion of cards greatly overpowered the previous sets (see power creep). Cards in later sets had effects and power values which would have been considered overly powerful in the beginning. There were also cards that distorted the game and, with the right deck compilation, allowed you to win in a single turn without even allowing your opponent to have a turn. Some players believed Score did not act swiftly enough to ban or issue errata to these cards. The most notable change was when Israel "I.Q." Quiroz, then head designer quit the game due to creative differences with the playtesting and development team.

After leaving Score Entertainment Israel Quiroz was accused of cheating in the draft portion of the GenCon 04 realms tournament when his deck was found to have too many ghost rares and rares possible for a deck. While opening packs he called the judge, Scott Sager, to inform and show him that one of the packs opened had an extra ghost rare. When brought to the attention of the tournament judge, Scott Sager, the claims were immediately dismissed. Quiroz's team then went on to take second in the tournament.

== Reception ==
The YuYu Hakusho Trading Card Game was voted the Best Trading Card Game of 2003 by Inquest Gamer Magazine.
