= WarCry (game) =

Collectible card game

- Designers: Luke Peterschmidt, Ryan Miller, Erik Yaple, David Freeman and Kev Martin
- Publishers: Sabertooth Games
- Players: 2+
- Playing time: Approx 40 min
- Chance: Some
- Age range: 12+
- Skills: Card playing Arithmetic; Basic Reading Ability

WarCry is an out-of-print collectible card game set in the world of Warhammer Fantasy and published by Sabertooth Games. The base game cards were released in 2003, with newer expansions introduced in the months since. A video game adaptation, titled Warhammer: Battle for Atluma, was created for the PSP in 2006.

== Gameplay summary ==
In WarCry the opposing players become generals of vast armies and wage battles for control over the Old World. Each game is divided into three segments called battles. The outcome of each battle is determined after both players pass consecutively. Their Victory Points totals are compared and the player with the highest total wins the battle. The player who wins two out of the three battles is the winner.

To begin playing the game each player needs two decks - the Army Deck and the Action Deck - containing a minimum of 30 cards each.

The Army Deck consists cards representing units that will fight for you, the heroes that may fight alongside a given unit and magical weapons, armor or other items that can somehow help swing the tide of battle in your favour.

The Action Deck has cards that represent special strategies, powerful attacks and other tricks that every leader has to know in order to win.

Each battle is divided into two phases: the muster phase and the combat phase.

In the muster phase players take turns placing unit or equipment cards on the table. Each such card has a cost in Gold points. In the first battle both players can muster units for up to 20 Gold, in the second - up to 25, and in the third - up to 30.

When both players are done mustering units the combat phase begins. The opponents take turns issuing commands (a command can be an attack, a move or playing a special card from hand). After they both pass successively the battle ends. The player with the most Victory Points (calculated by adding the strength of the surviving units) wins.

== Card types ==
WarCry includes cards for the Grand Alliance (featuring blue marble backgrounds), the Hordes of Darkness (featuring black backgrounds with bones or fire), and neutral cards (featuring green backgrounds with leaf vines). The cards are further broken down into the following types:

- Units - Unit cards represent small armies or soldiers on the battlefield, including infantry, cavalry, and flying units.
- Attachments - Attachment cards are attached to units, where they generally remain until the unit is destroyed. They can confer bonuses or additional abilities.
- Actions - Action cards are used during combat to help friendly units or punish the enemy. They represent things such as strategies, tactics, or unexpected events.

== Card sets ==
WarCry cards were released in sets each containing 120 unique cards (with exceptions noted below). They could be purchased in randomized booster packs of 9 playable cards and one redeemable "Gold Piece" card. On July 1, 2006, the Sabertooth Games redemption program officially ended, with newer boosters no longer containing any redeemable cards. On December 12, 2006, Sabertooth announced that Veterans of Battle (released in early 2007) would be the final WarCry product release and that support for organized play would cease few months later.

=== Standard card sets ===
- WarCry (core set) (2003, 184 cards)
- Winds of Magic (2003)
- Siege of Darkness (August 2003)
- Dogs of War (December 2003)
- Path of Glory (March 2004)
- Legions of Chaos (June 2004)
- Siege of Middenheim (September 2004)
- Harbingers of War (January 2005)
- Bringers of Darkness (April 2005)
- Bearers of Redemption (July 2005)
- Swords of Retribution (October 2005)
- War of Attrition (January 2006, 388 cards from earlier expansions)
- Hand of Fate (March 2006)
- Marks of Power (May 2006)
- Veterans of Battle (January 2007)

=== Special pre-constructed decks of 2x60 cards ("battle boxes") ===
- Chivalry and Deceit (April 2004) - Bretonnia vs. Skaven
- Death and Honour (January 2005) - Imperial Vampire Hunters vs. Vampire Counts
- Valor and Treachery (September 2005) - Wood Elves vs. Skaven

=== Special sets ===
- Champions of the Grand Alliance binder (September 2004) - 6x3 Alliance cards
- Champions of the Hordes of Darkness binder (September 2004) - 6x3 Horde cards
- Legends of WarCry (June 2005) - 6x3 cards for the six main races
