= Teenage Mutant Ninja Turtles Trading Card Game =

Collectible card game

- Publishers: Upper Deck
- Players: 2 or more
- Setup time: < 5 minutes
- Playing time: < 60 minutes

Teenage Mutant Ninja Turtles Trading Card Game is an out-of-print collectible card game by Upper Deck and was released in February 2004. It was based on the cartoon series of the same name. The base set called Turtles Unleashed had 55 Common cards and 100 Foil cards, with 10 Super Rare foils and 10 Ultra Rare foils. Two planned expansions were to be released but never materialized: Swift as the Wind in May 2004 and Still as the Forest in September 2004. Future cards were to include Mystic Ninjas and Shredder's Elite Guard.

== Gameplay ==
There are three playing modes: Fight mode and two training modes. The main game has players making decks using Attack, Event, Character and Item cards. The first person to have their opponent run out of cards, wins the game. Players set up blockers to defend their deck, and any damage that gets through makes them discard from their deck. To make it more interesting, players are allowed to place their cards face down on the board.

== Reception ==
The game was said to be "lacking in fun". The rules were simpler than Magic: the Gathering or Yu-Gi-Oh!
