= G.I. Joe Trading Card Game =

Collectible card game

- Cardback of the GI Joe trading card game
- Designers: Aaron Forsythe, Rob Gutschera, Mark Rosewater
- Publishers: Wizards of the Coast
- Players: 2 or more
- Setup time: < 5 minutes
- Playing time: < 60 minutes

G.I. Joe Trading Card Game is an out-of-print collectible card game by Wizards of the Coast based on the G.I. Joe toys by Hasbro. It was released in 2004 and developed by Aaron Forsythe, Rob Gutschera and Mark Rosewater. The base set had 114 cards with 1 promo card called "Venomous Maximus" that could only be obtained from the Valor vs Venom VHS/DVD. An expansion called Armored Strike was released in 2005 and had 78 cards. The game inspired a fan-made creation called G.I. Joe Firefight.

The card game's release was timed to the G.I. Joe brand's 40th anniversary.

== Gameplay ==
Players assume the roles of G.I. Joe or Cobra and the last man standing wins.

Each player shuffles their deck containing at least 50 cards with no more than 4 copies of any single card. Each player then deals themself 8 cards face up into two rows, otherwise known as the Front and Rear Ranks. First player is randomly decided.

On the player's turn, they draw 2 cards and hold them upside-down to read the Boost Numbers. The player then chooses a right-side up soldier from their front rank and then chooses any soldiers from their opponent's front rank. Then each player selects a Boost card and places it face down. When both players have selected their card, they're revealed and the Boost Number is added to their soldier's Power. Highest total Power wins. When the fight is over, the soldier that is lost is discarded as well as the Boost cards. Any soldier in the Rear Rank is moved forward to any blank spot in the Forward Rank.

The player with no remaining soldiers left in their Ranks, loses the game.

== Reception ==
The game was considered very simple with little to no strategy element even after implementing the advanced rules which reduced the number of powerful cards you could play. The game ceased production in 2005 due to insufficient demand and an overcrowded CCG market.
