= Babylon 5 Collectible Card Game =

Collectible card game

Babylon 5
- Babylon 5 CCG card back
- Designers: Ran Ackels, Edi Birsan, David Hewitt, Paul Brown, John Myler, Kevin Tewart
- Publishers: Precedence Entertainment
- Players: 2+ but typically 4 or 5
- Setup time: 10+ minutes, excluding deck construction
- Playing time: max 2 hours (tournament)
- Chance: limited (draw)
- Skills: CCG knowledgeable Arithmetic; Interpersonal communication

The Babylon 5 Collectible Card Game (B5 CCG) is an out-of-print collectible card game set in the Babylon 5 universe. It was published from 1997 to 2000. The game is ideally set for 4-5 players but can be played with a minimum of two players up to as many as 20 if using multiple Non-Aligned Factions and Home Factions. This CCG is distinct from most others of the genre for being specifically designed to be played by more than two players. The gameplay tends to have strong political elements encouraging significant player interaction aka "table talk" which is appropriate for a game based on a series which featured such a strong element of political intrigue. During its six-year existence under the Precedence Entertainment banner it released two core sets, five expansions sets and one revision set. There were two World Championships during that time. The game still continues to have a cult following as further expansions were made available online.

== History ==
Initially planning for a November release, the game was launched on December 11, 1997 in North America with the release of Premiere. Precedence then began hiring more staff to promote the B5 CCG as quickly and completely as possible. A large part of their success came with their promoting of the game. Not only would they give free starter decks at major conventions but they offered solid prize support for local tournaments that were organised through their Ranger program. Precedence was also the first company to begin a successful promo chase card program, where various promo cards were made available through different means of acquiring them, some more difficult than others. This, as opposed to other companies who offered relatively common cards as promos, gave Precedence an edge in marketing not seen before. They followed up their debut with the Shadows expansion and within the same year released the Deluxe edition, a reprint of the Premier Edition (minus the starter decks) and the Great War expansion. By the beginning of 1999, they found themselves near the top of the CCG market at that time.

"1998 was a year of triple digit growth for Precedence, much of it spurred on by the broad based international success of our Babylon 5 Collectible Card Game," reports Precedence Entertainment CEO Paul W. Brown III

"For some months now, Babylon 5 has been one of the best selling and most played hobby card games in every country where the game is sold; particularly in North America, the UK and as far abroad as Australia. The enthusiasm and support of the fans has been overwhelming," stated Brown. "We're most proud of the game's reputation for being true to the show. When your die- hard players even include people who have written for the actual series, like Babylon 5's original executive story editor Larry Ditillio, you know you're doing something right."

In 1999, Precedence and Warner Brothers came to an agreement to renew the licensing to continue use of the Babylon 5 franchise until June 2001.

After their breakout year they released Psi Corps, an expansion dedicated to the world of telepaths. To promote this release, Precedence ran a contest where booster pack purchasers could collect 5 randomly inserted psi corps identicards (chase cards) to redeem them for a chance to have dinner with Walter Koenig, the actor who portrayed Alfred Bester on the show. This was followed by Severed Dreams the same year and in 2000, Wheel of Fire and Crusade.

In June 2001 Warner Brothers chose not to renew Precedence's license which brought publication/distribution of the game to an abrupt halt. This caused the cancellation of the Collector's set which was already at the printers, and the well into development Anla'shok expansion. The company closed its doors in 2002 although this was not as a direct result of the ending of the Babylon 5 licensing agreement with WB.

== Sets ==
The Babylon 5 CCG was released as a base set (Premiere Edition) in December 1997. It consisted of 445 cards sold in 60-card starter decks and 8-card booster packs. Each starter deck was keyed to one of the four races in the game, and consisted of 50 commons fixed to a particular race, and 10 random uncommon and rare cards. Ultra-rare chase cards, some signed by actress Mira Furlan (who had the role of Delenn in the television show), were randomly inserted in some booster packs. In January 1998, two introductory box sets were released, each with a simplified rulebook, a booster pack, and two fixed 50-card starter decks. These covered the Earth-Minbari and Centauri-Narn Wars depicted in the show.

It was followed by seven expansion sets:

- The Shadows (1998)
- Deluxe (basically a reprint of Premier including the "fixed" cards from the starter decks but no starter decks themselves) (1998)
- Great War (December 1998)
- Psi Corps (1999)
- Severed Dreams (1999)
- Wheel of Fire (2000)
- Crusade (2000)

The Collectors Set was at the printers at the time that the games production was stopped.

The Shadows, released in June 1998, was the first expansion set and had 203 cards (100 rare, 53 uncommon, 50 common) sold in 12-card booster packs that each contained two rare cards. It was known as Shadow War during its early development. It covered the television show's second and third seasons, and 2,500 booster packs included a Morden card signed by Ed Wasser, the actor who played the role. Because of collation errors in the original set, Precedence Entertainment enacted a new policy that individuals whose booster packs had problems could send in the UPC code and receive six rare cards in exchange, and individuals who bought five booster boxes but failed to complete a set would receive a copy of each missing card.

The Great War expansion set was based on the Shadow War events in the third season of the television show. It introduced the Shadow and Vorlon fleets, and the Non-Aligned Worlds faction. Precedence Entertainment was negotiating with Claudia Christian and Peter Jurasik, who respectively portrayed the roles of Commander Susan Ivanova and Londo Mollari, to sign a number of their character's cards for inclusion as chase cards in booster packs. The 350-card set was released in November 1998 and was based on the television show's third season and early episodes of the fourth season. It enabled games to have more than four players.

The expansion set Psi Corps was planned for March 1999, and the release would include signed cards of the character Alfred Bester by its actor Walter Koenig. It introduced the Psi Corps factions based on the Psi Corps agency of humans with telepathic or para-psychological abilities from the television show.

The planned expansion set Crusade would be based on the Babylon 5 spin-off television series Crusade and introduced the Drakh faction for a planned release in July 1999. The set The Third Age was planned for release in 2000 and based on the fifth season of the television show. By July 1999 it had been renamed Severed Dreams and its focus shifted to the end of the fourth season of the television show.

A number of fan sets have been created and there is an active Facebook group led by Bruce Mason, one of the senior Rangers, that is re-imagining the game under the name the B5 Virtual Card Game (B5VCG)

== Zeta Squadron ==
Zeta Squadron was the official member club of B5 CCG players registered with Precedence publishing. They received newsletters which informed them of upcoming events and expansions. They also received promo cards such as the Na'Toth (variant).

An equivalent newsletter "Black Omega" was published in the United Kingdom supporting the European player base.

== Tournament formats ==
There are several variant tournament formats that can be used when playing the B5 CCG. Below is a listed of most commonly used formats.

Type	Details
Basic Constructed Deck	Players have a 60 card minimum deck and can have a 20 card reserve which they can use to transfer cards to and from between rounds.
Sealed Deck	Players are given one sealed starter deck and normally two or three booster packs. From those cards they must create a 60 card deck to play with
Third Age	Third Age is a variant of Basic Constructed Deck, with the following additional rules: 1.Any card, except for characters and fleets, that was printed in Premier or Deluxe is banned in this format. Cards which were in Premier/Deluxe and were reprinted in the Non-Aligned or Psi Corps starter decks, such as Earth, Universe Today Feature, and Trade Pact, are banned (again, characters and fleets are NOT affected, so Drazi Sunhawk and Talia Winters are still allowed). 2.Zhabar is banned. 3.Promotional cards released at the time of Premier or Deluxe are not banned as they are not part of the standard print run.
Battle for Earth	Battle for Earth Tournaments use the standard Basic Constructed Deck Tournament rules, with the following exceptions: 1. There are three factions, all Human. The starting factional ambassadors are Jeffrey Sinclair, William Morgan Clark, and Bester.; 2. All factions have a starting tension of 5 towards all other Human factions.; 3. Babylon 5's influence start the game at 0, and no effect in the game can raise or lower this starting value.; 4. There are no effects that can generate a Babylon 5 vote. Effects that would do so are ignored.
Spoo	Also known as the "Highlander Tournament", this is a variant of the "Constructed Deck Tournament" but players may only have one copy of any given card.
Master of All	Same as Basic Constructed but deck size is set at 45.

The Rangers were tournament organizers from around the world who conducted sanctioned tournaments, game demonstrations and arranged playtesting on behalf of Precedence.

=== World Championships ===
During the course of the B5 CCG lifespan, Precedence Entertainment held two World Championships. Each featured a large proportion of players from around the world and fierce competition:

==== First World Championship ====
The sixteen finalists at the first B5 CCG World Championships in Pomona, California. Pictured center holding the Vorlon action figure is Inaugural B5 CCG World Champion Serge Lavergne.

The first B5 CCG World Championship was held at Vorcon 1 in Pomona, California, October 16–18, 1998. Held at the Sheraton Fairplex Hotel & Conference Center, the eventual winner was Canadian champion, Serge Lavergne of Ottawa, Ontario, Canada. He had used a Narn / Vorlon military hybrid speed deck with the “Order Above All” winning agenda.

Opposition came from Australians Steve Green and Les Allen, Marcel Kopper of Germany, UK Champion Mike Pemberthy, Pan-European Champion Hayden Gittings, as well as Americans John Paiva, Pete Simpson, Kyle Bennick, Mike Jasperson, Anthony Oshmago, David Sisson, Paul Beaman, Kyle Sykora and John and Johnna Golden.

==== Second World Championship ====
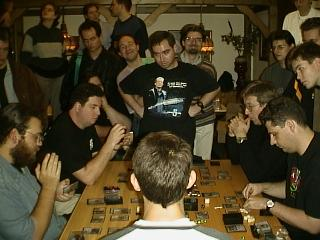
Kevin Tewart, organised play coordinator for Precedence Publishing, supervising the final table of the 2nd World Championships, Aachen.

The second B5 CCG World Championship was in Aachen, Germany, October 8–10, 1999. The champion there was Martin Franz who used a Human deck with the agenda “A Rising Power”. The Final table comprised Marco Schütz (Narn), Michael Brand (Minbari), Peter Ender (Centauri) and Paul Sheward (Non-Aligned).

The second World Championship again featured national qualifiers, but there was also a pre-qualifying tournament run the day before. This allowed a number of locally based players to qualify for the World Championship itself and led to the makeup of the "top table" i.e. 4 out of the 5 players were "local" Germans. It was commented upon that this turned the World Final into a team event with the German players ensuring that one of them won the tournament.

== Gameplay ==
Each player represents one of the races holding a seat in the Babylon 5 Council of Races, for which there is a related starter deck. They begin the game with a hand of four cards they choose, one of which must be the ambassador for their chosen race. The other cards are chosen from aftermath, agenda, character, conflict, enhancement, event, fleet, group, and location cards from their deck. Turn order is determined by the influence of each player, from least to greatest.

A player will use influence, which represents factional strength, in order to play cards, acquire favors, and increase their power. During the game, various factors are tracked on an included sheet, including influence, tension, and unrest.

Characters have a supporting role when they enter play, but may become part of the ambassador's inner circle as the game progresses with the use of influence. Characters can be neutralized (their cards are turned face down) when they sustain damage; those with a supporting role are subsequently discarded, whereas those in the inner circle may be healed.

== Signed/Embossed Cards ==
Precedence randomly included cards autographed by actors from the show in booster packs in every set/expansion that was produced. With the exception of the Premier edition, these cards were also embossed with Precedence's logo to confirm authenticity.

In most cases these boosters were also "God packs" i.e. where every card in the booster was of rare rarity replacing the normal distribution of common and uncommon cards.

== Promo cards ==
Precedence also produced promotional cards for each of the sets/expansions. The cards were distributed as tournament prizes, box toppers, with hobby magazines such as Scrye and also by mail-in offers.

== Online play ==
Programs such as LackeyCCG and Vassal allow players to meet and play online.

== Reception ==
In a review published in the May 1998 issue of The Duelist, Cory Herndon stated that Precedence Entertainment had "done the popular sci-fi series justice" because "the card game is just as complicated and involved as the show's five-year story arc" with a "great creative framework in which to play". He also stated that it "doesn't lend itself well to a two-player game". In a subsequent review in the October 1998 issue, he stated that the game had "well-thought-out mechanics" and "sharp game play".

== Reviews ==
- Syfy
