= Tomb Raider Collectible Card Game =

Card game

- Card back to the Tomb Raider CCG
- Publishers: Precedence
- Players: 2 or more
- Setup time: < 5 minutes
- Playing time: < 60 minutes

Tomb Raider Collectible Card Game is an out-of-print collectible card game by Precedence based on the Tomb Raider franchise. It was unveiled at the 1999 Gen Con Game Fair in Milwaukee and was released in August 1999. The Premier set contained 210 cards. Two expansions were released for the game: Slippery When Wet in December 1999 (209 cards) and Big Guns in April 2000 (159 cards). A third expansion called Uncovered was planned for summer of 2000 but never materialized. The game incorporated gameplay elements more commonly found in (and according to one reviewer better suited for) board games such as dice and room tiles.

Tomb Raider CCG was nominated for an Origins Award in 1999.
