= Horus Heresy (card game) =

Collectible trading card game

Collectible card game
- Sanguinius: Bane of Daemons; Illustrated by Tiernan Trevallion; Card 33 ("Ultra-rare"); "Siege of Terra" booster pack
- Designers: Ryan Miller; Luke Peterschmidt
- Illustrators: Many, including: Adrian Smith; John Blanche; Franz Vohwinkel
- Publishers: Sabertooth Games
- Publication: 2003
- Years active: 2003–2008
- Genres: Collectible card game
- Languages: English; French; German
- Players: 2
- Playing time: Approx. 30 min (Base Set)
- Chance: Some
- Age range: 12+
- Skills: Arithmetic; Basic reading ability; Card playing
- Media type: Playing cards (plastic, foil)
- Notes; Final expansion released 2005; game discontinued 2008

Horus Heresy is an out-of-print collectible card game originally produced in 2003 by Sabertooth Games. The game is set in the Warhammer 40,000 fictional universe developed by parent company Games Workshop. It attempts to recreate the struggle between the Loyalist forces of the Emperor of Mankind and the Traitor forces of Warmaster Horus, during the civil war known as the Horus Heresy. The game's development and sale by the publisher were discontinued in 2008, following financial difficulties at the parent company.

== History ==
The original game package (Base Set) was released in 2003. The starter pack included several decks, rulesets for the opposing sides, and a variety of accessories and components. Promotional foil cards were also produced, as well as "story cards" that describe the background. Following the game's English language release, versions in other languages were also sold. Booster packs and other companion products were released in the years that followed; the last such set was published in 2005.

The game ruleset and mechanics were designed by Ryan Miller and Luke Peterschmidt. The cards and foils were illustrated by a number of artists from Sabertooth Games' art and design department; background text was provided by Games Workshop writers. The game is set during the Horus Heresy, a galaxy-wide civil war and cornerstone event of the far future fictional universe that is the campaign setting of Games Workshop's Warhammer 40,000 wargame system. The war is set in motion by Horus, previously Warmaster (supreme military commander) of the Imperium of Man and favorite of the Emperor.

The setting for each game set (base or expansion) is limited to a single significant battle or confrontation in the Heresy conflict. (Note: The defending player in the Base Set game may choose, as setting, one of two early Heresy campaigns: the Battle of Isstvan III or the Battle of Prospero, each represented on one side of double-sided sector cards.) However the sets as a collection broadly cover the entire span of the campaign, from its earliest major battle to the final confrontation. The illustrations, annotations, and text provided new information on the Horus Heresy in general; the art joined previous work (in other Horus Heresy products) as the event's initial established imagery. Both art and story text were reproduced in later Games Workshop products.

Following the sale of most Sabertooth Games assets by parent company Games Workshop in 2008, further development or sale of the game and related products was discontinued.

== Gameplay overview ==
A single game of the Horus Heresy Base Set features two commanders and their respective fleets and armies struggling over control of a planet. The attacker and defender fight for control of three sectors which are deemed key to winning the planet. The game ends if either player captures two sectors, or after four complete turns have elapsed. In the case of neither player capturing two sectors within the allotted play period, whoever has won more sectors (i.e. a single sector while the opponent has none), or the most valuable sector (in the case of each player having won a single sector), wins the game.

At the start of each full turn, players deploy one card face up to each unclaimed sector. Players then draw a hand of six cards and alternate deploying cards face down to an unclaimed sector, one at a time. The goal is to make sure that each sector has the needed assortment of cards to ensure victory over the opponent. One sector can be heavily reinforced, but this will leave another sector vulnerable, so considerable strategy is needed when choosing what to deploy where. Following deployment, the attacking player chooses a sector to contest, and after resolution of that battle, the defending player chooses a different sector to contest (if one remains unclaimed). Each battle ends with one, or neither player winning the sector; after the two battles, the turn ends and a new turn begins (with additional deployments).

== Card types ==
The cards are broken down into four different types:

- Units – The majority of cards are of this type, and depict infantry units or vehicles which will do battle on the ground in order to take control of a sector.
- Assets – Asset cards represent anything on the battlefield other than troops or units. This includes things such as the presence of an important leader, or the effect of having a command post in the vicinity.
- Ships – Ship cards signify a fleet's battleships and transports in orbit high above the planet, which can directly or indirectly assist the battle on the ground.
- Sectors – Sectors are the key portions of the planet over which the battles take place. Sector cards have information about the number of troops required to capture the sectors, as well as any special abilities or effects of the area. These cards are never part of the play deck and are only used during game setup.

All cards other than sector cards are either affiliated with one of the two factions, or are unaligned. "Loyalist" cards feature the Imperial Aquila (the Emperor's Eagle), while "Traitor" cards feature the Eye of Horus (the Traitor leader's sigil). "Unaligned" cards, representing units or assets usable by either side, feature a set of scales. Loyalist and Traitor cards may not be mixed together in the same play deck, since a deck represents a given side in the conflict.

== Card rarity ==
As with many of the games produced by Sabertooth Games, each playable card has rarity information printed on to help determine how rare it is. The rarity is denoted by the number of small dots appearing at the bottom of the card, according to the following legend: (Note: All "Ultra-rare" cards are foil-stamped.)

•	Common
••	Uncommon
•••	Rare
••••	Ultra-rare

When the game was first introduced, the starter pack (Base Set) included two play decks, one for the Loyalist and one for the Traitor side. Each contained 3 sector cards, 42 fixed cards, and 18 random cards (including three rares), all of which could theoretically be used. Additional enhancements to the starter were available, 9-card booster packs containing one rare card and eight common-or-uncommon cards. Boosters from later expansion sets contain the same 1-rare/8-common-or-uncommon distribution.

== Compatibility ==
The cards are compatible with the later Dark Millennium collectible card game also published by Sabertooth Games. Loyalist cards from Horus Heresy may be mixed with "Imperial" cards from Dark Millennium, while Traitor cards may be mixed with "Chaos" cards. Unaligned Horus Heresy cards can be used with either of the two, but not with new Dark Millennium types such as the "Ork" and "Eldar" decks. Properly mixed decks are legal Dark Millennium Imperial or Chaos decks, but they are not legal in Horus Heresy.

Cards from the older Warhammer 40,000 Collectible Card Game are semi-compatible with Horus Heresy, requiring rule changes in order to work with the new game system.

== Components ==
Collectible card sets
Name of set	Set abbr.	Cards per unit	Cards in set	Year	Product code
Horus Heresy Loyalist Starter	HH	63	152	2003	STG5020
Horus Heresy Traitor Starter	HH	63	152	2003	STG5020
Horus Heresy Booster	HH	9	152	2003	STG5020
Sedition's Gate Booster	SG	9	120	2004	STG5030
Traitor's Gambit Booster	TG	9	120	2004	STG5040
Daemon's Fire Booster	DF	9	80	2004	STG5050
Dropsite Massacre Booster	DM	9	80	2005	STG5080
Siege of Terra Booster	ST	9	80	2005	STG5100

Other products
Name of product	Set Abbr.	Product type	Number of cards	Year
The Horus Heresy	HH	Background deck	55	2003
Hands of the Emperor	HE	Binder with cards	9 (each 4x)	2004
The Battle for Prospero	BP	Battle box	30 (in 2 60-card-decks)	2004
Blades of the Traitor	BT	Binder with cards	9 (each 4x)	2005
Battle for the Golden Throne	GT	Battle box	30 (in 2 60-card-decks)	2005
Promo Cards	R	Foils	55	2003–2005
