= Dark Millennium =

Collectable card game

- Sample card from Dark Millennium
- Designers: Seth Morrigan
- Publishers: Sabertooth Games
- Players: 2
- Playing time: Approx 45 min
- Chance: Some
- Age range: 10+
- Skills: Card playing Arithmetic; Basic Reading Ability

Dark Millennium is an out-of-print collectible card game. It's the successor to the Horus Heresy and set in the fictional Warhammer 40,000 universe. The base card set was launched in October 2005 by Sabertooth Games.

== Storyline ==
Events have conspired to draw members of different races and factions into a remote area of space. Each group has its own set of goals, but they all include eradication of any who would stand in opposition. Drawn to the resource-rich regions of the Pyrus sector are:

- The forces of Chaos, championed by the Word Bearers.
- A horde or "Waaagh!" of Orks, led by Warboss Garzulk the Faceless.
- Shadowy Eldar, manipulating events for their own purposes.
- The Emperor's own forces of the Imperium.

== Gameplay overview ==
Dark Millennium uses the same basic rules as Horus Heresy.

A game in the Dark Millennium universe pits two commanders and their respective armadas against each other for control of an important planet within the Pyrus sector. One side is declared the attacker, while the other is the defender, but both fight for control of three sectors which are deemed key to winning the planet. The game continues until a player captures two sectors, or four complete turns have elapsed. In the case of neither player dominating the planet after four turns, whoever has won control of a sector (or the more valuable sector if each player has one) wins the game.

Each full turn starts with the deployment phase. In this phase, players deploy one card from their decks face up to each and every unclaimed sector. Players then draw a hand of six cards and alternate deploying cards face down from their hand to any unclaimed sector, one a time. There is no limit to how many cards may be deployed to each sector, but a relative imbalance may lead to an advantage in one sector with a corresponding disadvantage in another sector. Following deployment, the attacking player chooses a sector to contest, and a battle for that sector commences. Once the battle ends, the result may be that one of the two players has claimed the sector, or that neither player has, but once a sector is captured, it is out of play. After the battle selected by the attacker, the defending player chooses a different sector to contest (if any other sector remains unclaimed). Following the conclusion of the two battles, the turn ends and a new turn begins with the deployment phase being repeated.

== Factions and decks ==
Cards in Dark Millennium have one of the following five faction affiliations:

- Chaos - The demonic forces of Khorne, Slaanesh, Nurgle, and Tzeentch, as well as Chaos Space Marines from the Word Bearers, World Eaters and Death Guard.
- Ork - Destructive Ork clans including the Evil Sunz, Bad Moons, and Goffs.
- Eldar - Ancient Eldar hailing from the Craftworlds of Ulthwe, Biel-Tan, and Saim-Hann.
- Imperial - Loyal forces of the Emperor of Mankind, including the Imperial Guard, heroic Space Marines, and Daemonhunters of the Inquisition.
- Unaligned - Resources which can be made use of any be any faction, or which represent a generic entity which any faction could possess.

A play deck (made up of units, assets, and ships) must contain at least 60 cards, and may not contain more than four of any one card (except where a specific card notes otherwise). Each player must choose a side or faction when creating a deck, and this restricts the deck to only unaligned cards and cards from that specific faction. A given game may involve two competing decks from any of the factions; there are no additional restrictions on the participants.

Additional factions may be made available in future expansion sets.

== Card roles ==
Each non-sector card in the Dark Millennium game system can serve in three separate and distinct roles. These uses are as follows:

1. Normal - Functioning as the actual unit, asset or ship printed on the face of the card. Cards deployed to sectors operate in this standard fashion.
2. Die - Used as a pseudo-random number generator, to check the success or failure of some action. When a result needs to be determined, the top card of that player's deck is flipped over (into the discard pile), revealing the die printed on the card.
3. Command - Kept in the player's hand during a battle and played as needed for strategic purposes. In this role, the card is turned upside down and only the inverted text at the bottom is used; the remaining portion of the card serves no purpose.

Because of this system, every card placed into a deck must be considered for each of its uses. A powerful unit may have a poor die role, while a worse asset with an excellent command line ability may be worth keeping in a deck on the chance that it is drawn into the hand when initiating a battle.

== Product compatibility ==
The cards from the previous Horus Heresy collectible card game (which was also produced by Sabertooth Games) are usable with Dark Millennium, although the Horus Heresy cards only represent two of the factions within Dark Millennium. Players playing Chaos decks or Imperial decks can freely use Traitor and Loyalist cards in their decks, respectively.

Cards from Dark Millennium may not be used in games of Horus Heresy.

== Dark Millennium products ==
Sabertooth Games previously indicated that they intended to release roughly four expansion sets for Dark Millennium per year, in an effort to keep the game universe fresh. While this schedule was met in 2006, the product was scheduled for retirement in 2007, with the final expansion set released in April of that year.

Starter decks from the base set are available for each of the four main factions, with the majority of the remaining sets available only as boosters. The following card sets and products have been released or announced:

Dark Millennium collectible cards sets
Name of set	Release date	Cards per unit	Cards in set
Dark Millennium Starter	October 2005	60	228
Dark Millennium Booster	October 2005	11	228
Hope's Twilight Booster	January 2006	11	120
Fires of Pyrus Booster	April 2006	11	120
Rising Darkness Booster	July 2006	11	120
Damnation's Gate Starter	October 2006	60	228
Damnation's Gate Booster	October 2006	11	228
Shadows of the Warp	January 2007	11	120
Prophecy's Peril	April 2007	11	120

Other Dark Millennium products
Name of product	Release date	Product type	Cards
Dark Millennium: Dawn of War	November 2005	Battle box	120
