= Immortal: The Invisible War =

- Designers: Brianna Von Gries; Ran Valerhon; Rick Don
- Publishers: Precedence Entertainment, Jikkarro Enterprises
- Publication: December 31, 1993; 32 years ago
- Years active: 1993 – present
- Genres: Modern fantasy, horror
- Systems: Immortal
- Playing time: Varies
- Chance: Dice rolling
- Skills: Role-playing, improvisation
- Website: www.invisiblewar.com

Immortal: The Invisible War is a tabletop role-playing game created by artist and writer Ran Valerhon. Immortal details a world where characters begin to discover they are the titular "Immortals", an ancient race of shapeshifters who reincarnated from ancient gods and legends, while reacclimating to a millennia-old war against a dark power threatening Earth.

The game is set in the modern world, but makes extensive use of world mythology, high fantasy elements, and an original alternative earth history.

== Background ==
Millions of years ago, the dragon immortals known as the Abzulim enslaved nearly all other immortal creatures, including the shapeshifting Himsati race. They created an empire spanning the cosmos and made war with the Primals, elemental entities older than the universe itself. When the war ended, the Abzulim had fled while the Primals vanished from existence; the Himsati, now free, wandered until the coming of humanity, when they were transformed into human-like guises. Humanity exalted the Himsati as gods, monsters, legends, and heroes, but strife among the Himsati ended their stewardship over humanity forced them to go into seclusion for eons. Upon their return, the Himsati fought against evil immortals and won, but the Deepwalkers, the strongest of the Abzulim, returned to Earth and evolved beyond the ability of normal immortals to identify them. The Twelve Tribes of the Himsati—descendants of their own mythical pasts—wage war against the Droves, groups of dark mortal creatures and their immortal leaders known as the Progeny, to save Earth. Players play as a member of the Twelve Tribes, able to alter reality with the power of their voice, who can reincarnate and reinvent themselves with an evolution known as Lethe.

=== The Twelve Tribes ===
- Arachne (Fates) - These spider Himsati embody fate, destiny and luck.
- Eremites (Seekers) - Dedicated to humility, service and devotion. They frequently have primate Himsati.
- Hemari (Muses) - Made up of the remains of tribe Anopheles, they embody desire, emotion and artistic expression.
- Magdalen (Whisperers) - knowledge, scholarly pursuits and intellectualism.
- Morrigan (Paladins) - warriors devoted to honor valor and duty.
- Osiri (Necromancers) - They seek to penetrate the mysteries of dying and existence beyond death.
- Peri (Bearers of Justice) - they embody justice and purity and seek to right the wrongs of the world.
- Phoenix (Shining Ones) - bright immortals devoted to self-knowledge.
- Protean (Changers) - shape shifters who hear the call of the primal wilds.
- Sharakai (Dragons) - are devoted to balance and self-enlightenment.
- Terat (Dreamwalkers) - populate the collective dreams of humanity guiding them away from dark forces.
- Tuatha - (Fae) - are in harmony with nature and seek to protect the natural world.

== Game system ==
Immortal uses its own custom system. Task resolution involves rolling a die, adding the rating of an attribute and skill, and comparing it to a target number or the roll of an opponent. Higher rolls are better, and the more you exceed your target number, the higher your degree of success. The type of die rolled is determined by your Spirit characteristic—anything from a four-sided die to a 12-sided die.

Characters are created with a set of points, which they allocate to seven attributes, skills, and advantages (boons). You gain extra points by taking optional disadvantages (banes). The attributes are Strength, Agility, Endurance, Perception, Presence, Willpower and Spirit. Skills are broad, and you gain a free specialization or "focus" in each skill you take. Immortal characters also choose five "natures", which are special abilities derived from their animal form—a tiger's claws and teeth, for example, would count as natures.

== Publication history ==
The game was created in the 1980s, then published in 1994 as Immortal: Invisible War by Precedence Entertainment. The 295-page softcover book was designed by Ran Ackels, with artwork by Ackels, Dee Beckwith and Stephen Crompton. This was followed the same year with the supplement Immortal Pilot Pack. Several stand-alone adventures and supplements were published from 1995–1997. The Dracul Source Book and Serenades: The First Book of Powers were published in 1996.

In 1999, Precedence Entertainment published a second edition, Immortal: Millennium, a much shorter 96-page softcover book, also designed by Ran Ackels, that featured simplified rules. This was followed by two supplements, The War Book (1999) and The Book of Banes (2000).

Due to issues over Immortal: Millennium, the game's original creator took back control of the product. A third edition, using the original title Immortal: The Invisible War, was released in 2005 via the game's website as a free PDF.

== Reception ==
William Spencer-Hale reviewed Immortal in White Wolf #49 (Nov., 1994), rating it a 4 out of 5 and stated that "In conclusion, Immortal is a game worthy of attention. It doesn't fall into any specific genre. You can decide how to play it based on your imagination and tastes. The possibilities are endless. I highly recommend this game to both veterans and novices alike."

In the September 1996 edition of Dragon (Issue 233), Rick Swan wondered why this game had not received more recognition, saying, "Although it's been around for a while, Immortal has yet to attract the audience it deserves, this despite an aggressive ad campaign, a terrific concept, and stellar execution." Swan admitted that the game leaned heavily upon White Wolf Publishing's stable of modern horror role-playing games, and like those games, was similarly afflicted by "overwrought prose". But he called Immortal "as enticing as a daydream." He was fascinated by the ability of players to adjust the basic abilities of their characters, saying, "An Immortal PC is less a flesh-and-blood entity than a metaphysical chameleon [...] Immortal's take on the player character is so radical, it’s like having your skull unscrewed and your brains stirred up." Swan did have some issue with the task resolution system, which used "jargon-laden rules that border on the incomprehensible." He also noted that combat is even more complex, but found that "combat can be a jaw-dropping experience." Swan concluded by giving the game an above average rating of 4 out of 6, saying, "Playing a construct of wispy memories, navigating the spirit graveyards of the Blue Air, doing battle with rogue immortals in the Underworld... well, it’s an experience without parallel [...] Despite the steep learning curve and the mud field of jargon, Immortal deserves more attention."

== Other reviews ==
Reviewed in Shadis #15
