= Precedence Entertainment =

Role-playing game company

Precedence Entertainment was a publisher of collectible card games and role-playing games. Games produced include the Tomb Raider Collectible Card Game which was nominated for an Origins Award in 1999, the Babylon 5 Collectible Card Game, The Wheel of Time CCG, Immortal: The Invisible War, Rifts Collectible Card Game and The Terminator Collectible Card Game. The company was first formed in 1993 by Randy Lindsay and developed into the merchandising arm of Reality Simulations, they ceased operations on April 12, 2002.
