= Collectible card game =

Game played using specialized playing cards

Assorted CCG cards

A collectible card game (CCG), also called a trading card game (TCG) among other names, (Note: Collectible Card Games (CCG) may also be known as a trading card game (TCG), customizable card game, expandable card game (ECG - see Age of Empires II) or simply as a card game. Terms such as "collectible" and "trading" are often used interchangeably because of copyrights and marketing strategies of game companies.) is a type of card game that mixes strategic deck building elements with features of trading cards. The genre was introduced with Magic: The Gathering in 1993.

Cards in CCGs are specially designed sets of playing cards. Each card represents an element of the theme and rules of the game, and each can fall in categories such as creatures, enhancements, events, resources, and locations. All cards within the CCG typically share the same common backside art, while the front has a combination of proprietary artwork or images to embellish the card along with instructions for the game and flavor text. CCGs are typically themed around fantasy or science fiction genres, and have also included horror themes, cartoons, and sports, and may include licensed intellectual properties.

Generally, a player will begin playing a CCG with a pre-made starter deck, then later customize their deck with cards they acquire from semi-random booster packs or trade with other players. As a player obtains more cards, they may create new decks from scratch using the cards in their collection. Players choose what cards to add to their decks based on a particular strategy while also staying within the limits of the rule set. Games are commonly played between two players, though multiplayer formats are also common. Gameplay in CCG is typically turn-based, with each player starting with a shuffled deck, then drawing and playing cards in turn to achieve a win condition before their opponent, often by scoring points or reducing their opponent's hit points. Dice, counters, card sleeves, or play mats may be used to complement gameplay. Players compete for prizes at tournaments.

Expansion sets are used to extend CCGs, introducing new gameplay strategies and narrative lore through new cards in starter decks and booster packs, that may also lead to the development of theme decks. Successful CCGs typically have thousands of unique cards through multiple expansions. Magic: The Gathering initially launched with 300 unique cards and currently has more than 30,000 as of December 2025.

The first CCG, Magic: The Gathering, was developed by Richard Garfield and published by Wizards of the Coast in 1993 and its initial runs rapidly sold out that year. By the end of 1994, Magic: The Gathering had sold over 1 billion cards, and during its most popular period, between 2008 and 2016, it sold over 20 billion cards. Magic: The Gathering's early success led other game publishers to follow suit with their own CCGs in the following years. Other successful CCGs include Yu-Gi-Oh! which is estimated to have sold about 35 billion cards as of January 2021, and Pokémon which has sold over 85 billion cards as of March 2026. Other notable CCGs have come and gone, including Legend of the Five Rings, Star Wars, Lord of the Rings, Vampire: The Eternal Struggle, and World of Warcraft. Many other CCGs were produced but had little or no commercial success.

Recently, digital collectible card games (DCCGs) have gained popularity, spurred by the success of online versions of CCGs like Magic: The Gathering Online, and wholly digital CCGs like Hearthstone. CCGs have further influenced other card game genres, including deck-building games like Dominion, and "Living card games" developed by Fantasy Flight Games.

== Characteristics ==
A collectible card game (CCG) is generally defined as a game where players acquire cards into a personal collection from which they create customized decks of cards and challenge other players in matches. Players usually start by purchasing a starter deck that is ready to play, but additional cards are obtained from randomized booster packs or by trading with other players. The goal of most CCGs is to beat one's opponent by crafting customized decks that play to synergies of card combinations. Refined decks will try to account for randomness created by the initial shuffling of the deck, as well as the opponent's actions, by using complementary and preferably efficient cards.

The exact definition of what makes a CCG is varied, as many games are marketed under the "collectible card game" moniker. The basic definition requires the game to resemble trading cards in shape and function, be mass-produced for trading and/or collectibility, and have rules for strategic gameplay. The definition of CCGs is further refined as being a card game in which the player uses their own deck with cards primarily sold in random assortments. If every card in the game can be obtained by making a small number of purchases, or if the manufacturer does not market it as a CCG, then it is not a CCG.

CCGs can further be designated as living or dead games. Dead games are those CCGs that are no longer supported by their manufacturers and have ceased releasing expansions. Living games are those CCGs that continue to be published by their manufacturers. Usually, this means that new expansions are being created for the game and official game tournaments are occurring in some fashion.

=== Gameplay mechanics ===
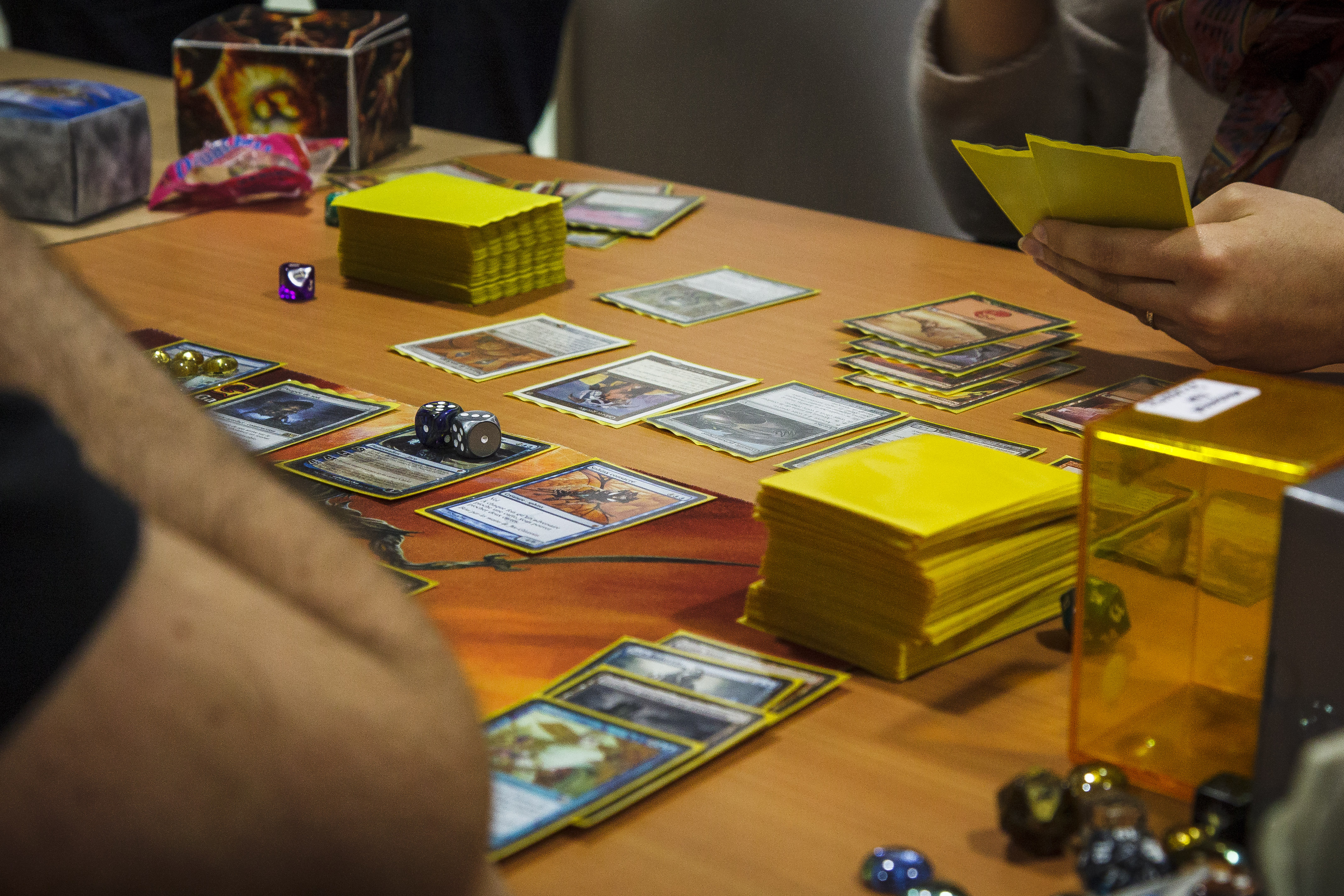
Players engaged in a game of Magic: The Gathering with sleeved cards

Each game has a fundamental set of rules that describes the players' objectives, the categories of cards used in the game, and the basic rules by which the cards interact. Each card will have additional text explaining that specific card's effect on the game. Many games utilize a set of keywords to simplify the card text, with keywords referring to common gameplay rules. For example, Magic: The Gathering has about 25 common keywords such as "flying", meaning the creature can only be blocked by other creatures with flying. Each card also generally represents some specific element derived from the game's genre, setting, or source material. The cards are illustrated and named for these source elements, and the card's game function may relate to the subject. For example, Magic: The Gathering is based on the fantasy genre, so many of the cards represent creatures and magical spells from that setting. In the game, a dragon is illustrated as a reptilian beast, has higher stats than smaller creatures, and has the aforementioned "flying" keyword. Flavor text on cards is frequently used to provide a narrative for story-driven games or sometimes as humorous asides.

The bulk of games are designed around a resource system by which the pace of each game is controlled. Frequently, the cards which constitute a player's deck are considered a resource, and the frequency of cards moving from the deck to the play area or the player's hand is tightly controlled. Relative card strength is often balanced by the number or type of resources needed in order to play the card, and pacing after that may be determined by the flow of cards moving in and out of play. Resources may be specific cards themselves or represented by other means (for example, tokens in various resource pools, symbols on cards, etc.).

Unlike traditional card games such as poker or crazy eights in which a deck's content is limited and pre-determined, players select which cards will compose their deck from any available cards printed for the game. This allows a player to strategically customize their deck to take advantage of favorable card interactions, combinations, and statistics. Deck sizes vary from CCG to CCG, needing to be large enough for variation in gameplay while small enough that the decks are shuffleable. Typical deck sizes range from as low as 30 cards (as used by, for instance, Hearthstone) to as high as 100 cards (as in Magic: The Gathering's Commander format). Many CCGs limit how many copies of a particular card can be included in a deck; such limits force players to think creatively when choosing cards and deciding on a playing strategy.

Cards come in several broad categories. Common categories, in addition to the aforementioned resource cards, include creatures that are summoned into battle who attack the opposing player and block their creatures' attacks; enchantments that buff or debuff these creatures' attributes and abilities; events, such as magic spells, that may have an immediate or ongoing resolution to one or more cards in play; and locations or story cards that present specific conditions impacting all actions.

Each match is generally one-on-one, but many games have variants for more players. Typically, the goal of a match is to play cards that reduce the opponent's life total to zero before the opponent can do the same. Some games provide for a match to end if a player has no more cards to draw in their deck. After determining which player goes first by coin flip or other means, players start by shuffling their decks and drawing an initial hand. Many games allow for a player to take a mulligan if they believe their starting hand is not good. Players then take turns. While the turn format is different depending on the game, typically it is broken into distinct phases, and all of their resources are reset so they may be used that turn. Players draw a card, play any number of cards by drawing from available resources, and make one or more attacks on their opponent. If necessary, there may be a cleanup step, including discarding cards to reach a maximum hand size.

Many games have rules enabling opposing players to react to the current player's turn; for example, a player may cast a counter-spell to cancel an opponent's spell. Games with such reaction systems typically define rules to determine the priority of reactions to avoid potential conflicts between card interpretations. Other games do not have such direct reaction systems but allow players to cast face-down cards or "traps" that automatically trigger based on the actions of the opposing player.

=== Distribution ===
Specific game cards are most often produced in various degrees of scarcity, generally denoted as fixed (F), common (C), uncommon (U), and rare (R). Some games use alternate or additional designations for the relative rarity levels, such as super-, ultra-, mythic- or exclusive rares. Special cards may also only be available through promotions, events, purchase of related material, or redemption programs. The idea of rarity borrows somewhat from other types of collectible cards, such as baseball cards, but in CCGs, the level of rarity also denotes the significance of a card's effect in the game, i.e., the more powerful a card is in terms of the game, the greater its rarity. A powerful card whose effects were underestimated by the game's designers may increase in rarity in later reprints. Such a card might even be removed entirely from the next edition, to further limit its availability and its effect on gameplay.

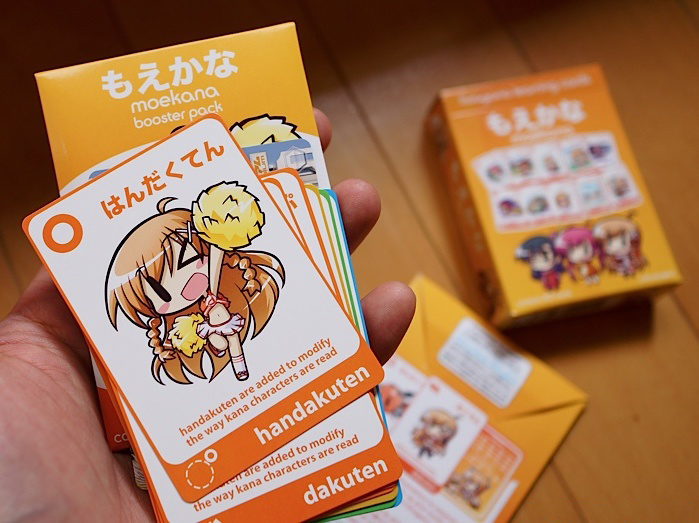
A cardboard booster pack for the Moekana educational card game, containing nine additional cards

Most collectible card games are distributed as sealed packs containing a subset of the available cards, much like trading cards. The most common distribution methods are:

- Booster packs — The most common distribution method. Booster packs for CCGs usually contain 8 to 15 randomly packaged cards, usually with an assured number of cards of specific rarities.
- Starter deck – An introductory deck that contains enough cards for one player. It may contain a random or a pre-determined selection of cards.
- Starter set – An introductory product that contains enough cards for two players. The card selection is usually pre-determined and non-random.
- Theme deck or Tournament deck – Most CCGs are designed with opposing factions, themes, or strategies. A theme deck is composed of pre-determined cards that fit these motifs.

Because of the rarity distribution of cards, many popular CCGs have a secondary marketplace, with players buying and selling cards based on perceived value. Many purchases are made to acquire rarer cards to help build competitive decks, while others are just for collection purposes. In some cases, early cards in a CCGs run or which have been banned from play can become of high value to collectors, such as Magic: The Gathering's Power Nine.

=== Similar games ===
There are similar games, usually inspired by CCGs, that should not be mistaken for CCGs:

- Collectible Common-Deck Card Games - Games such as Munchkin in which players share a common deck from which to draw, expandable through fixed-content expansions and boosters, rather than their own personal deck. Consequently, no customization of decks, trading, or metagaming occurs, and there is little interest in collection of the cards.
- Deck-building games - Games such as Dominion in which construction of the player's deck throughout the game is the main focus. Deck-building games ship with all the cards required to play and may offer expansions with fixed contents to add more variety to play. Dominion, the first such deck-building game, was directly inspired by Magic: The Gathering and thus has similar concepts.
- Non-Collectible Customizable Card Games, also known as Expandable Card Game (ECG) or Living Card Games (LCGs) - Games such as Android: Netrunner or The Lord of the Rings: The Card Game for which each player selects one of the multiple pre-made decks packaged with the game, eliminating randomness while acquiring the cards. However, after more non-random expansion packs are purchased, players can customize their decks according to certain deckbuilding rules, allowing for much exploration of the game's themes and mechanics. Some games of this type allow the game to be expanded with additional pre-made decks. "Living Card Game" is a registered trademark of Fantasy Flight Games who are generally associated as the main publisher of these types of games. LCGs do not use the randomized booster packs like CCGs and instead are bought in a single purchase or fixed-set expansions, and are generally marketed for costing much less than collectibles.

Many CCGs have also been remade into digital collectible card games (DCCGs), taking advantage of the ubiquity of the Internet for online play as well as for the potential of computerized opponents. DCCGs can exist as online counterparts of existing CCGs, such as Magic: The Gathering Online for Magic: the Gathering, as wholly original card games that take advantage of the digital space, such as Hearthstone, or in many other forms.

== History ==
=== Early history (Pre-1990s) ===
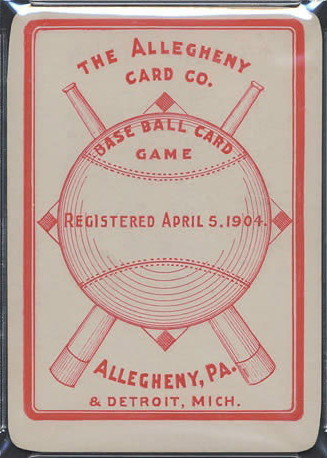
Allegheny's prototype of The Baseball Card Game from 1904, a precursor to the CCG that was never released

Regular card games have been around since at least the 1300s. The Base Ball Card Game, a prototype from 1904, is a notable precursor to CCGs because it had a few similar qualities but it never saw production to qualify it as a collectible card game. It is not known if the game was intended to be a standalone product or something altogether different like Top Trumps. The game consisted of a limited 112 cards and never saw manufacture past the marketing stage.

Early Batter-Up Baseball deck, c. 1949, with instruction sheet/diamond diagram

The first pre-CCG to make it to market was the Baseball Card Game, released by Topps in 1951 as an apparent followup to a game from 1947 called Batter Up Baseball by Ed-u-Cards Corp. Players created teams of hitters, represented by cards, and moved them around a baseball diamond according to cards representing baseball plays drawn from a randomized deck. Like modern CCGs, Topps' Baseball Card Game was sold in randomized packs and were collectible; however, it lacked the necessary strategic play that defines a CCG. Interaction between the two players was limited to who scored the most points and was otherwise a solitaire-like function since players could not play simultaneously. Other notable entries that resemble and predate the CCG are Strat-O-Matic, Nuclear War, BattleCards, and Illuminati.

Allen Varney of Dragon Magazine claimed the designer of Cosmic Encounter, published in 1979, Peter Olotka, spoke of the idea of designing a collectible card game as early as 1979.

=== Magic: The Gathering and CCG craze (1990–1995) ===
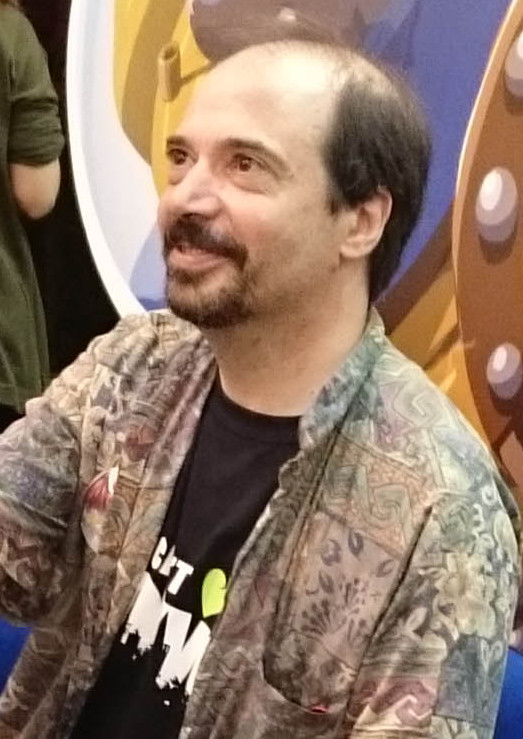
Richard Garfield (pictured in 2014) designed Magic: The Gathering taking elements from the board game Cosmic Encounter. The game was released in 1993.

Prior to the advent of the CCG, the market for alternative games was dominated by role-playing games (RPG), in particular Dungeons & Dragons by TSR. Wizards of the Coast (Wizards), a new company formed in Peter Adkison's basement in 1990, was looking to enter the RPG market with its series called The Primal Order which converted characters to other RPG series. After a lawsuit from Palladium Books which could have financially ruined the company, Wizards acquired another RPG called Talislanta. This was after Lisa Stevens joined the company in 1991 as vice president after having left White Wolf. Through their mutual friend Mike Davis, Adkison met Richard Garfield who at the time was a doctoral student. Garfield and Davis had an idea for a game called RoboRally and pitched the idea to Wizards of the Coast in 1991, but Wizards did not have the resources to manufacture it and instead challenged Garfield to make a game that would pay for the creation of RoboRally. This game would require minimal resources to make and only about 15–20 minutes to play.

In December 1991, Garfield had a prototype for a game called Mana Clash, and by 1993 he established Garfield Games to attract publishers and to get a larger share of the company should it become successful. When designing Magic: The Gathering, Garfield borrowed elements from the board game Cosmic Encounter which also used cards for gameplay, and from Strat-o-Matic baseball, in which players build a team of players before the baseball game itself is played.

In 1993 a "new kind of card game" appeared. It was different because the player could not buy all the cards at once. Players would first buy starter decks and then later be encouraged to buy booster packs to expand their selection of cards. What emerged was a card game that players collected and treasured but also played with. The first collectible card game created was Magic: The Gathering, invented by Richard Garfield, and patented by Wizards of the Coast in 1993. The game has remained popular, with Wizards of the Coast claiming it to be the most widely played CCG as of 2009. (Note: In contrast, Guinness World Records claimed Yu-Gi-Oh to be the best-selling trading card game as of 2011.) It was based on Garfield's game Five Magics from 1982. Originally, Mana Clash was designed with Wizards in mind, but the suit between Palladium Books and Wizards was still not settled. Investment money was eventually secured from Wizards and the name Mana Clash was changed to Magic: The Gathering. The ads for it first appeared in Cryptych, a magazine that focused on RPGs. On 4 July weekend of 1993, the game premiered at the Origins Game Fair in Fort Worth, Texas. In the following month of August, the game's Limited core set was released (also known as Alpha) and sold out its initial print run of 2.6 million cards immediately creating more demand. Wizards quickly released a second print run called Beta (7.3 million card print run) and then a second core set called Unlimited (35 million card print run) in an attempt to satisfy orders as well as to fix small errors in the game. December also saw the release of the first expansion called Arabian Nights. With Magic: The Gathering still the only CCG on the market, it released another expansion called Antiquities which experienced collation problems. Another core set iteration named Revised was released shortly after that. Demand was still not satiated as the game grew by leaps and bounds. Legends was released in mid-1994 and no end was in sight for the excitement over the new CCG.

What followed was the CCG craze. Magic was so popular that game stores could not satisfy the market demand. More and more orders came for the product, and as other game makers looked on they realized that they had to capitalize on this new fad. The first to do so was TSR who rushed their own game Spellfire into production, releasing it in June 1994. Through this period of time, Magic was hard to obtain because production never kept pace with demand. Store owners placed large inflated orders in an attempt to circumvent allocations placed by distributors. This practice would eventually catch up to them when printing capacity met demand coinciding with the expansion of Fallen Empires released in November 1994. Combined with the releases of 9 other CCGs, among them Galactic Empires, Decipher's Star Trek, On the Edge, and Super Deck!. Steve Jackson Games, which was heavily involved in the alternative game market, looked to tap into the new CCG market and figured the best way was to adapt their existing Illuminati game. The result was Illuminati: New World Order which followed with two expansions in 1995 and 1998. Another entry by Wizards of the Coast was Jyhad. The game sold well, but not nearly as well as Magic; however, it was considered a great competitive move by Wizard as Jyhad was based on one of the most popular intellectual properties in the alternative game market which kept White Wolf from aggressively competing with Magic. By this time, however, it may have been a moot point as the CCG Market had hit its first obstacle: too much product. The overprinted expansion of Magic's Fallen Empires threatened to upset the relationship that Wizards had with its distributors as many complained of getting too much product, despite their original over-ordering practices.

In early 1995, the GAMA Trade Show previewed upcoming games for the year. One out of every three games announced at the show was a CCG. Publishers other than game makers were now entering the CCG market such as Donruss, Upper Deck, Fleer, Topps, Comic Images, and others. The CCG bubble appeared to be on everyone's mind. Too many CCGs were being released and not enough players existed to meet the demand. In 1995 alone, 38 CCGs entered the market, the most notable among them being Doomtrooper, Middle-earth, OverPower, Rage, Shadowfist, Legend of the Five Rings, and SimCity. Jyhad saw a makeover and was renamed as Vampire: The Eternal Struggle to distance itself from the Islamic term jihad as well as to get closer to the source material. The Star Trek CCG from Decipher was almost terminated after disputes with Paramount announced that the series would end in 1997. But by the end of the year, the situation was resolved and Decipher regained the license to the Star Trek franchise along with Deep Space Nine, Voyager and the movie First Contact.

The enthusiasm from manufacturers was very high, but by the summer of 1995 at Gen Con, retailers had noticed CCG sales were lagging. The Magic expansion Chronicles was released in November and was essentially a compilation of older sets. It was maligned by collectors and they claimed it devalued their collections. Besides this aspect, the market was still reeling from too much product as Fallen Empires still sat on shelves alongside newer Magic expansions like Ice Age. The one new CCG that retailers were hoping to save their sales, Star Wars, was not released until very late in December. By then, Wizards of the Coast, the lead seller in the CCG market had announced a downsizing in their company and it was followed by a layoff of over 30 jobs. The excess product and lag in sales also coincided with an eight-month-long gap between Magic: The Gathering's expansions, the longest in its history.

In Hungary, Beholder Kft. released Cards of Power (Hatalom Kártyái; HKK) in 1995, inspired by Magic: The Gathering. HKK was later released in the Czech Republic. As of 2018, HKK is still being made.

=== Wizards of the Coast era (1996–1999) ===
Garfield applied for a patent for "a novel method of gameplay and game components that in one embodiment are in the form of trading cards" that includes claims covering games whose rules include many of Magic's elements in combination, including concepts such as changing the orientation of a game component to indicate use (referred to in the Magic and Vampire: The Eternal Struggle rules as "tapping") and constructing a deck by selecting cards from a larger pool. Garfield was granted the patent in 1997, which he then transferred the patent to Wizards of the Coast. The patent has aroused criticism from some observers, who believe it may have stifled growth of other CCGs, and looked to have some of its claims to be invalid. Peter Adkison, CEO of Wizards at the time, remarked that his company was interested in striking a balance between the "free flow of ideas and the continued growth of the game business" with "the ability to be compensated by others who incorporate our patented method of play into their games". Adkison continued to say they "had no intention of stifling" the industry that originated from the "success of Magic".

==== Stabilization and consolidation (1996–1997) ====
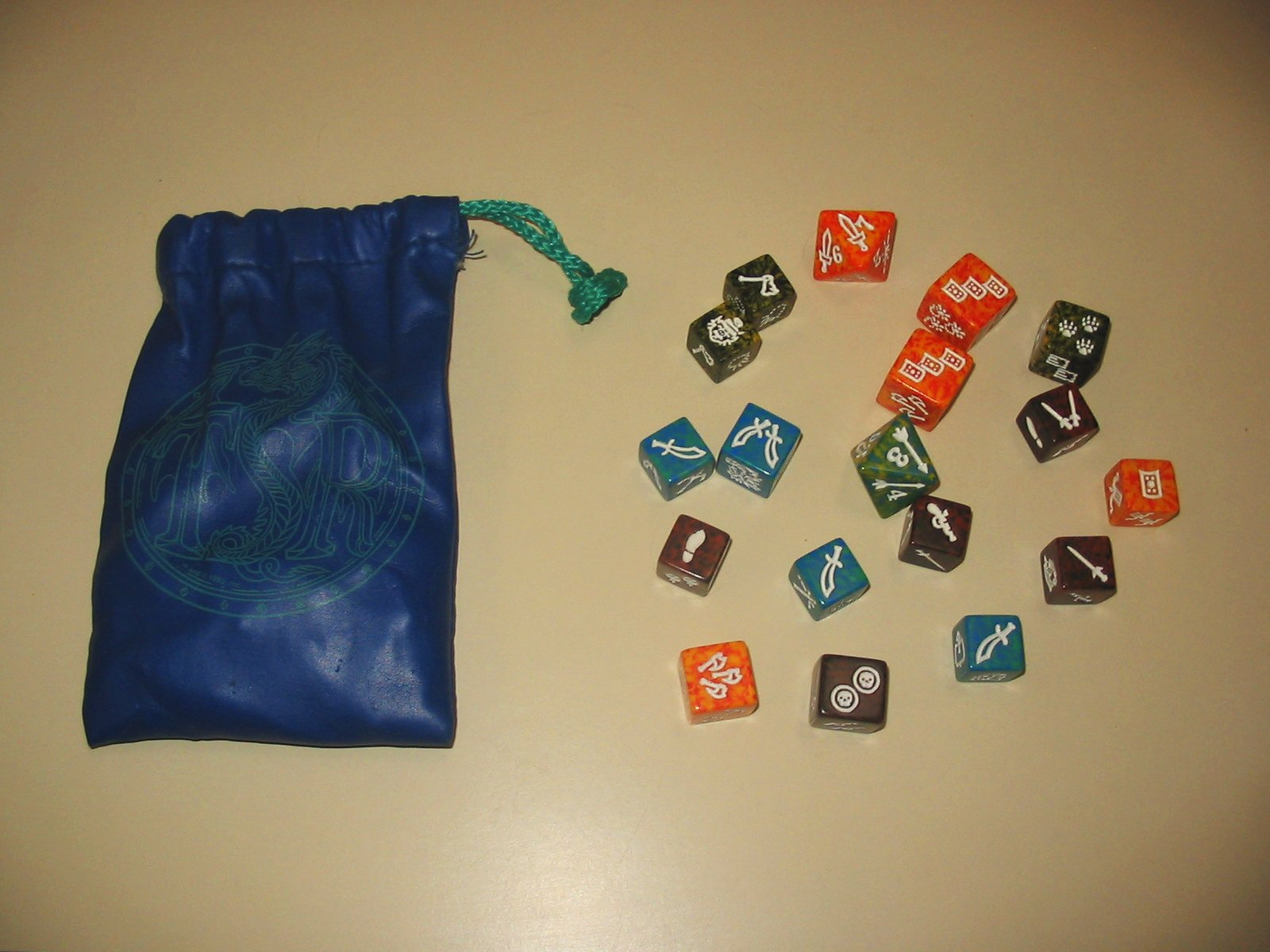
Dragon Dice was one of the attempts at a collectible dice game in the 1990s.

In early 1996, the CCG market was still reeling from its recent failures and glut of products, including the release of Wizards' expansion Homelands which was rated as the worst Magic expansion to date. The next two years would mark a "cool off" period for the over-saturated CCG market. Additionally, manufacturers slowly came to understand that having a CCG was not enough to keep it alive. They also had to support organized players through tournaments. Combined with a new dichotomy between collectors and players especially among Magic players, more emphasis was placed on the game rather than the collectibility of the cards.

Plenty more CCGs were introduced in 1996, chief among them were BattleTech, The X-Files, Mythos, and Wizards' very own Netrunner. Many established CCGs were in full swing releasing expansions every few months, but even by this time, many CCGs released only two years earlier had already been terminated. TSR had ceased production of Spellfire and attempted another collectible game called Dragon Dice which failed shortly after being released.

On 3 June 1997, Wizards of the Coast announced that it had acquired TSR and its Dungeons & Dragons property which also gave them control of Gen Con. Wizards now had its long-sought role-playing game, and it quickly discontinued all plans to continue producing Dragon Dice or resuming production of the Spellfire CCG. Decipher was now sanctioning tournaments for their Star Trek and Star Wars games, with the latter also enjoying strong success from the re-released Star Wars Special Edition films. The Star Wars CCG would remain the second best-selling CCG until the introduction of Pokémon to the United States in 1999.

Wizards continued acquiring properties and bought Five Rings Publishing Group, Inc., creators of the Legend of the Five Rings CCG, Star Trek: The Next Generation Collectible Dice Game, and the soon to be released Dune CCG, on 26 June. Wizards also acquired Andon Unlimited which by association gave them control over the Origins Convention. By September, Wizards was awarded a patent for its "Trading Card Game". Later in October, Wizards announced that it would seek royalty payments from other CCG companies. Allegedly, only Harper Prism announced its intention to pay these royalties for its game Imajica. Other CCGs acknowledged the patent on their packaging.

1997 saw a slow down in the release of new CCG games. Only 7 new games came out, among them: Dune: Eye of the Storm, Babylon 5, Shadowrun, Imajica and Aliens/Predator. Babylon 5 saw moderate success for a few years before its publisher Precedence succumbed to a nonrenewal of its license later on in 2001. Also in 1997, Vampire: The Eternal Struggle ceased production. However, Wizards of the Coast attempted to enter a more mainstream market with the release of a simplified version of Magic, called Portal. Its creation is considered a failure, along with its follow-up Portal Second Age released in 1998.

==== Wizards of the Coast dominates, Hasbro steps in (1998–1999) ====
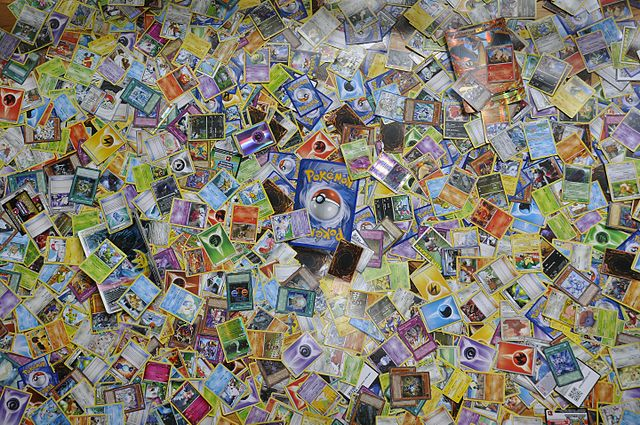
A collection of Pokémon and Yu-Gi-Oh! cards

By February 1998, one out of every two CCGs sold was Magic: the Gathering. Only 7 new CCGs were introduced that year, all but two being Wizards of the Coast product. C-23, Doomtown, Hercules: The Legendary Journeys, Legend of the Burning Sands and Xena: Warrior Princess were those five, and only Doomtown met with better than average reviews before its run was terminated and the rights returned to Alderac. C-23, Hercules, and Xena were all a part of a new simplified CCG system Wizards had created for beginners. Called the ARC System, it had four distinct types of cards: Resource, Character, Combat, and Action. The system also utilized the popular "tapping" mechanic of Magic: The Gathering. This system was abandoned shortly afterward.

Despite limited success or no success at all in the rest of the CCG market, Magic had recovered and Wizards learned from its lessons of 1995 and early 1996. Players still enjoyed the game and were acquiring its latest expansions of Tempest, Stronghold, Exodus and by year's end, Urza's Saga which added new enthusiasm to Magic's fanbase in light of some of the cards being "too powerful".

In early 1999, Wizards released the English-language version of the Pokémon TCG, starting with the Base Set, to the mass market (the original Japanese version of the game having been released by Media Factory in 1996). The game benefited from the Pokémon boom also of that year. At first, there was not enough product to meet demand. Some retailers perceived the shortage to be, in part, related to Wizards' recent purchase of the Game Keeper stores where it was assumed they received Pokémon shipments more often than non-affiliated stores. By the summer of 1999, the Pokémon TCG became the first CCG to outsell Magic: The Gathering. The success of Pokémon brought renewed interest to the CCG market and many new companies began pursuing this established customer base. Large retail stores such as Walmart and Target began carrying CCGs and by the end of September, Hasbro was convinced on its profitability and bought Wizards of the Coast for $325 million (equivalent to $628.1 million in 2025).

A small selection of new CCGs also arrived in 1999, among them Young Jedi, Tomb Raider, Austin Powers, 7th Sea and The Wheel of Time.

=== Franchising (2000–2002) ===
==== Transitions and refining of the market (2000) ====
By 2000, the volatility of the CCG market was familiar to its retailers. They foresaw Pokémon's inevitable fall from grace as the initial boom reached its peak in April of that year. The panic associated with the overflooding of the CCGs from 1995 and 1996 was absent and the retailers withstood the crash of Pokémon. Yet CCGs benefited from the popularity of Pokémon and they saw an uptick in the number of CCGs released and an overall increased interest in the genre. Pokémon's mainstream success in the CCG world also highlighted an increasing trend of CCGs being marketed with existing intellectual properties, especially those with an existing television show, such as an anime. New CCGs introduced in 2000 included notable entries in Sailor Moon, The Terminator, Digi-Battle, Dragon Ball Z Collectible Card Game, Magi-Nation and X-Men. Vampires: The Eternal Struggle resumed production in 2000 after White Wolf regained full rights and released the first new expansion in three years called Sabbat War. Wizards of the Coast introduced a new sports CCG called MLB Showdown as well.

Decipher released its final chronological expansion of the original Star Wars trilogy called Death Star II and would continue to see a loss in sales as interest waned in succeeding expansions, and their Star Wars license was not being renewed. Mage Knight was also released this year and would seek to challenge the CCG market by introducing miniatures into the mix. Though not technically a CCG, it would target the same player base for sales. The real shake-up in the industry, however, came when Hasbro laid off more than 100 workers at Wizards of the Coast and ended its attempts at an online version of the game when it sold off the subsidiary's interactive division. Coinciding with this turn of events was Peter Adkisson's decision to resign and Lisa Stevens whose job ended when The Duelist magazine (published by Wizards of the Coast) was canceled by the parent company. With Adkisson went Wizards' acquisition of Gen Con and the Origins Convention went to GAMA. Hasbro also ceased production of Legends of the Five Rings in 2000, but its production resumed when after it was sold to Alderac in 2001.

==== Franchise trends continue (2001–2002) ====
The years 2001 and 2002 progressed with the CCG market being less likely to take risks on new and original intellectual properties, but instead, it would invest in CCGs that were based on existing franchises. Cartoons, movies, television, and books influenced the creation of such CCGs as Harry Potter, The Lord of the Rings, A Game of Thrones, Buffy the Vampire Slayer, Yu-Gi-Oh! and two Star Wars CCGs: Jedi Knights and a rebooted Star Wars TCG, by Decipher and Wizards of the Coast. They followed the demise of the original Star Wars CCG by Decipher in December 2001, but they would see very little interest and eventually the two games were canceled. Other niche CCGs were also made, including Warlord: Saga of the Storm and Warhammer 40,000.

Upper Deck had its first hit with Yu-Gi-Oh! The game was known to be popular in Japan but until 2002 had not been released in the United States. The game was mostly distributed to national retailers, with hobby stores added to their distribution afterward. By the end of 2002, the game was the top CCG even though it was nowhere near the phenomenon that Pokémon was. The card publisher Precedence produced a new CCG in 2001 based on the Rifts RPG by Palladium. Rifts had top-of-the-line artwork but the size of the starter deck was similar in size to the RPG books. Precedence's other main CCG Babylon 5 ended its decent run in 2001 after the company lost its license. The game was terminated and the publisher later folded in 2002. The release of The Lord of the Rings TCG marked the release of the 100th new CCG since 1993, and 2002 also marked the release of the 500th CCG expansion for all CCGs. The Lord of the Rings TCG briefly beat out sales of Magic for a few months.

Magic continued a steady pace releasing successful expansion blocks with Odyssey and Onslaught. Decipher released The Motion Pictures expansion for the Star Trek CCG, and also announced that it would be the last expansion for the game. Decipher then released the Second Edition for the Star Trek CCG which refined the rules, rebooted the game, and introduced new card frames. Collectible miniature games continued their effort to take market share away from the CCG market with the releases of HeroClix and MechWarrior in 2002 but saw limited success.

=== A second wave of new CCGs (2003–2005) ===
The next few years saw an increase in the number of companies willing to start a new CCG, partly owing to the success of Pokémon and Yu-Gi-Oh!. New CCGs entered the market, many of which tried to continue the trend of franchise tie-ins. Notable entries include The Simpsons, SpongeBob SquarePants, Neopets, G.I. Joe, Hecatomb, Teenage Mutant Ninja Turtles and many others. Duel Masters was introduced to the United States after strong popularity in Japan the preceding two years. Wizards of the Coast published it for a couple of years before weak sales resulted in its cancellation. Two Warhammer CCGs were released with Horus Heresy and WarCry. Horus Heresy lasted two years and was succeeded by Dark Millennium in 2005.

Also, two entries from Decipher were released, one that passed the torch from their Star Wars CCG to WARS. WARS kept most of the gameplay mechanics from their Star Wars game, but transferred them to a new and original setting. The game did not do particularly well, and after two expansions, the game was canceled in 2005. The other new CCG was .hack//Enemy which won an Origins award. The game was also canceled in 2005.

Plenty of other CCGs were attempted by various publishers, many that were based on Japanese manga such as Beyblade, Gundam War, One Piece, Inuyasha, Zatch Bell!, Case Closed, and YuYu Hakusho. Existing CCGs were reformatted or rebooted including Dragon Ball Z as Dragon Ball GT and Digimon D-Tector as the Digimon Collectible Card Game.

An interesting CCG released by Upper Deck was called the Vs. System. It incorporated the Marvel and DC Comics universes and pitted the heroes and villains from those universes against one another. Similarly, the game UFS: The Universal Fighting System used characters from Street Fighter, Soul Calibur, Tekken, Mega Man, Darkstalkers, etc. This CCG was obtained by Jasco Games in 2010 and is currently still being made. Another CCG titled Call of Cthulhu was the spiritual successor to Mythos by the publisher Chaosium. Chaosium licensed the game to Fantasy Flight Games who produced the CCG.

In Russia, 2003 marked the release of Berserk, the first Russian CCG. Its grid-based battlefield and emphasis on card placement drew some comparisons with board wargames. The game would run for 12 years, before being discontinued in 2015. It was later relaunched in 2023.

Probably one of the biggest developments in the CCG market was the release of Magic's 8th Edition core set. It introduced a redesigned card border and it would later mark the beginning of a new play format titled Modern that utilized cards from this set onward. Another development was Pokémon, originally published in English by Wizards, having its publishing rights transferred to Pokémon USA, Inc. in June 2003.

=== The CCG renaissance continues (2006–present) ===
The previous year's influx of new CCGs continued into 2006. Riding on the success of the popular PC Game World of Warcraft, Blizzard Entertainment licensed Upper Deck to publish a TCG based on the game. The World of Warcraft TCG was born and was carried by major retailers but saw limited success until it was discontinued in 2013 prior to the release of Blizzard's digital card game Hearthstone. Following previous trends, Japanese-influenced CCGs continued to enter the market. These games were either based on cartoons, anime, or manga and included: Naruto, Avatar: The Last Airbender, Bleach, Rangers Strike and the classic series Robotech. Dragon Ball GT was rebooted once again in 2008 and renamed as Dragon Ball. Many other franchises were made into CCGs with a few reboots. Notable ones included Cardfight!! Vanguard, Conan, Battlestar Galactica, Power Rangers, 24 TCG, Redakai, Monsuno, and others, as well as another attempt at Doctor Who in the United Kingdom and Australia. Publisher Alderac released the City of Heroes CCG based on the City of Heroes PC game. Another video game, Kingdom Hearts for the PS2, was turned into the Kingdom Hearts TCG by Tomy.

A few other CCGs were released only in other countries and never made it overseas to English speaking countries, including Monster Hunter of Japan, and Vandaria Wars of Indonesia. By the end of 2008, trouble was brewing between Konami, who owned the rights to Yu-Gi-Oh! and its licensee Upper Deck. Meanwhile, strong sales continued with the three top CCGs of Pokémon, Yu-Gi-Oh!, and Magic: the Gathering. The Warhammer series Dark Millennium ended its run in 2007.

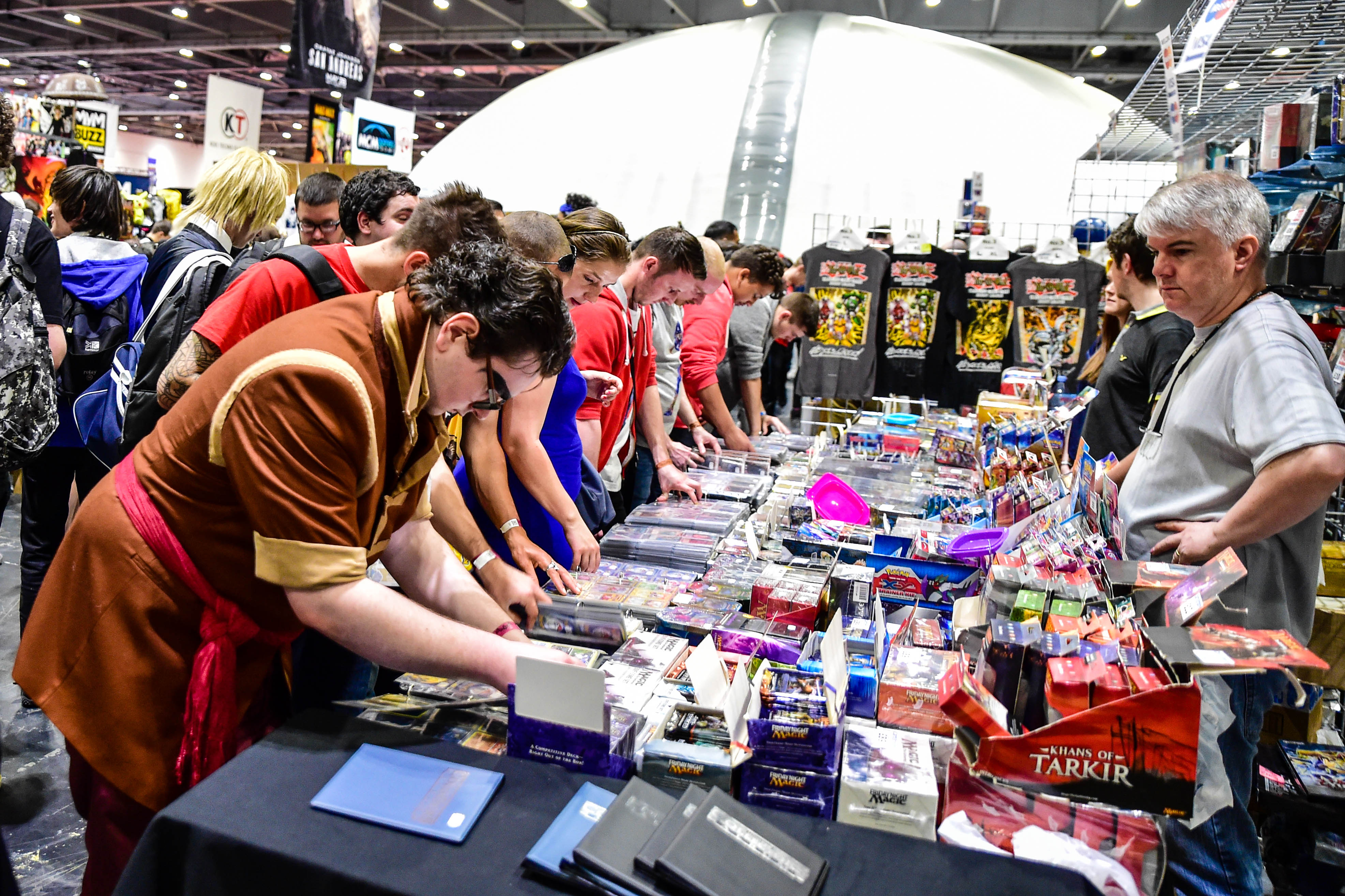
Convention attendees browsing collectible card game cards at MCM London Comic Con May 2015

Magic: the Gathering saw a large player boom in 2009, with the release of the Zendikar expansion. The spike in the number of Magic players continued for a few years and leveled off by 2015. Interest also developed with their multiplayer format called Commander. This increase in the player base created a Magic subculture based on finance speculation. New players entering the market from 2009 to 2015 desired cards that were printed before 2009 and with smaller print runs. Demand outstripped quantity and prices of certain cards increased and speculators started to directly manipulate the Magic card market to their advantage. This eventually attracted the interest of the controversial figure Martin Shkreli, former CEO of Turing Pharmaceuticals, for a brief period of time. Prices of cards from previous sets increased dramatically and the American market saw an influx of Chinese counterfeits capitalizing on the demand. This created a unique situation where the most desirable and expensive cards could be printed by counterfeiters, but not by the brand owner, due to a promise made with collectors in 1996 and refined in 2011. In 2015, Wizards of the Coast implemented more anti-counterfeit measures by introducing a holographic foil onto cards with specific rarities, in addition to creating a proprietary font. Between the time period of 2008 to 2016, Magic: the Gathering sold over 20 billion cards.

A rise in tie-in collectible card games continued with the introduction of the My Little Pony Collectible Card Game. It was licensed to Enterplay LLC by Hasbro and published on 13 December 2013. The collectible cards, according to president Dean Irwin, proved to be moderately successful, so Enterplay reprinted the premiere release set mid-February 2014. Other tie-in games released included the Final Fantasy Trading Card Game and Star Wars: Destiny; which had collectible cards and dice which after a 3-year run ended production in early 2020. Force of Will was released in 2012 in Japan and in 2013 in English, but as an original intellectual property.

One of the longest running CCGs, Legend of the Five Rings, released its final set Evil Portents for free in 2015. After a 20-year run, the brand was sold to Fantasy Flight Games and released as an LCG.

In March 2018, it was announced that PlayFusion and Games Workshop would team up to create a new Warhammer trading card game.

During the late 2010s and early 2020s, Japanese publisher Bandai expanded its presence in the trading card game market through games based on established anime and manga franchises. The company announced the Dragon Ball Super Card Game in 2017, with its initial release scheduled for July of that year. This was followed by a new Digimon Card Game in 2020, and the One Piece Card Game in 2022. In 2023, Bandai introduced Union Arena, a trading card game featuring characters from multiple anime, manga and video game franchises under a shared gameplay system. In September 2023, these products were brought together under the "Bandai Card Games" brand, which was established as part of the company's efforts to expand its international business and create opportunities for interaction between fans of its intellectual properties. A revamped version of the Dragon Ball Super Card Game, called Dragon Ball Super Card Game Fusion World was released in 2024, with a digital version also released at the same time. In June 2026, Bandai announced a new Naruto Card Game scheduled for simultaneous worldwide release in June 2027.

Forbes reported that the global Trading Card Game market size in 2022 was valued at $2.99 billion and it is expected to reach $4.2 billion by 2028.

== Reception ==
In 1996, Luke Peterschmidt, designer of Guardians, remarked that unlike board game and RPG players, CCG players seem to assume they can only play one CCG at a time. Often, the less popular CCGs will have localized sales success; in some cities a CCG will be a hit, but in many others it will be a flop.

=== Concerns about gambling ===
Like lootboxes in video games, there are concerns about the random and sealed booster packs. However, challenges to whether booster packs are equivalent to gambling have failed to hold up in court, as CCGs typically follow similar rules established for baseball card distribution. These include that the publisher states what the rarity expectations are for a booster pack, and that all cards they sell have equal value; it is only the secondary market that assigns speculative value to rarer cards that elevates their price. Since the publisher has no interaction with the secondary market, this helps to insulate their from gambling concerns.

A survey among users of Reddit's online message boards found little evidence of the need to regulate collectible card games. This concern for gambling plays a big part of the brand messaging for Living Card Games with fixed non-randomized distribution of cards.

== See also ==
- Collectible dice games
- Collectible miniature game
- Digital collectible card game
- List of collectible card games
- List of digital collectible card games
- List of most expensive CCG cards
- Loot box criticism
- Non-sports trading card

== Sources ==
- Miller, John Jackson; Greenholdt, Joyce (2003). Collectible Card Games Checklist & Price Guide (2nd ed.). Krause Publication. ISBN 0-87349-623-X.
