= List of Wizards of the Coast products =

This list of Wizards of the Coast products includes games and other products published by Wizards of the Coast as an independent developer and publisher, and any of its subsidiaries, its computer and video game divisions, and later as a brand of Hasbro.

== Games and products ==
=== Board games ===
A board game is a tabletop game that involves counters or pieces moved or placed on a pre-marked surface or "board", according to a set of rules.

- Axis & Allies (Revised Edition), as well as D-Day, Europe, Pacific, and Battle of the Bulge spinoffs
- Betrayal at House on the Hill
- Diplomacy
- Lords of Waterdeep
- Monsters Menace America
- Magic the Gathering: Arena of the Planeswalkers
- Nexus Ops
- Risk 2210 A.D. and Risk Godstorm
- RoboRally
- Vegas Showdown

=== Collectible card games ===
- BattleTech Trading Card Game
- C-23
- Codename: Kids Next Door Trading Card Game
- Duel Masters Trading Card Game
- Dune
- Harry Potter Trading Card Game
- Hecatomb
- Hercules: The Legendary Journeys
- Magic: The Gathering
- MLB Showdown
- NBA Showdown
- Neopets Trading Card Game
- Netrunner
- NFL Showdown
- Pokémon Trading Card Game (publishing right transferred back to Nintendo in 2003)
- The Simpsons Trading Card Game
- Star Sisterz
- Star Wars: The Trading Card Game
- Vampire: The Eternal Struggle (previously Jyhad)
- WCW NITRO Trading Card Game
- Xena: Warrior Princess
- Xiaolin Showdown Trading Card Game

=== Miniature games ===
- Axis & Allies Miniatures
- Dreamblade
- Dungeons & Dragons Miniatures Game
- Star Wars Miniatures
- Heroscape

=== Online games ===
- Magic: The Gathering Online
- Magic Duels
- Magic: The Gathering Arena

=== Role-playing games and supplements ===
- Alternity (defunct line, acquired in the TSR buyout)
- Ars Magica 3rd edition supplements only.
- d20 Modern
- d20 system
- Dungeons & Dragons (acquired in the TSR buyout)
- Everway
- Gamma World
- Marvel Super Heroes Adventure Game (acquired in the TSR buyout)
- Star Wars Roleplaying Game
- The Primal Order
- Talislanta 3rd edition

Wizards of the Coast drafted the Open Game License used by Open Gaming Foundation and the d20 system.

=== Standalone card games ===
- Alpha Blitz
- Filthy Rich (game)
- Guillotine
- Pivot
- The Great Dalmuti and Corporate Shuffle (a Dilbert-themed edition; it is not functionally identical, however. See The Great Dalmuti for detail on the differences.)
- Three-Dragon Ante

=== Fantasy novel series ===
Wizards of the Coast also publishes many fantasy novel series based on its other game products. Some of these are now out-of-print.

- Dragonlance
- Eberron
- Forgotten Realms
- Greyhawk
- Legend of the Five Rings
- Magic: The Gathering (since 1998)
- Planescape
- Ravenloft

Wizards also has a juvenile publishing imprint, Mirrorstone Books, which has produced books for StarSisterz, Dragonlance: The New Adventures and Knights of the Silver Dragon.
