= Chessboards: The Planes of Possibility =

1993 role-playing game supplement

Chessboards
- Cover art by Rob Alexander
- Designers: Dave Howell
- Illustrators: Anson Maddocks; Quinton Hoover; Ron Spencer; Yan Rozentsveig; Sandu Florea; Rob Alexander; Dave Howell (maps)
- Publishers: Wizards of the Coast
- Publication: 1993
- Genres: Generic fantasy role-playing

Chessboards: The Planes of Possibility is a book published by Wizards of the Coast (WotC) in 1993 that is a supplement to The Primal Order, WotC's first publication. Chessboards sets out a system for planar construction that can be used with many of the popular fantasy role-playing game system of the time.

== Description ==
Chessboards explains how a fantasy role-playing gamemaster can create planes of existence on which the campaign's deities can dwell. The book first outlines a possible multiverse of five primary planar groups. The concept of permissive and imperative absolutes on planar design is discussed, as well as sentient planes of existence, steady state versus expanding or contracting universes, and problems in designing one's own multi-verse. The book also provides extensive examples of several planes.

== Publication history ==
In 1992, WotC published their first product, Peter Adkison's The Primal Order, the first book in a "capsystem" that would explain how to design role-playing game campaigns, and provide advice on how those designs could be adapted for use with many role-playing games such as AD&D, RuneQuest and Palladium Fantasy Role-Playing Game. Three supplements for the Primal Order were published: Pawns: The Opening Move (1992 — a compendium of powerful servants and minions of deities), Knights: Strategies in Motion (1993 — creating worshippers), and Chessboards: Planes of Possibilities (1993). The latter was a 114-page perfect bound softcover book written by Dave Howell, with cover art by Rob Alexander, and interior art by Anson Maddocks, Quinton Hoover, Ron Spencer, Yan Rozentsveig, Christopher Rush and Sandu Florea.

WotC's next planned step in their capstone system was a series of books titled The Military Order. However, the young company was sued by Palladium Books for their use of the Palladium Fantasy Role-Playing Game system in the Primal Order series. After a year of legal acrimony, Michael Pondsmith, then president of GAMA, negotiated a settlement. By the time that was resolved, WotC was too busy dealing with the unprecedented popularity of their new game Magic:The Gathering, and work on all of their role-playing products was postponed, and eventually abandoned.

== Reception ==
In the July 1994 edition of Dragon (Issue #207), Rick Swan called this book "a mess, but a glorious mess." Swan was not a fan of the book's design, saying, "Graphically, it's a bore." He also found the material badly organized, and in need of an index. But he found that "the quality of the writing more than compensates for any deficiencies in the presentation. With his effortless mix of formality and whimsy, Howell writes like a dream. He illuminates complicated ideas with striking imagery." Swan concluded by giving the book an above average rating of 5 out of 6, saying that "even at their most obscure, Howell's musings are never less than fascinating. Chessboards stands as a work of remarkable intelligence and irresistible mischief. If you can resist a book with a section titled 'Planes as Morons,' maybe you're taking this stuff too seriously." Two years later, in Issue 9 of Inquest, Swan gave this book a satirical "Numbers Lust Weenie" award, noting the impossibly convoluted formulae found in the book, using as an example "An excerpt from the appendix, explaining the formula required to calculate the growth of alternate planes of existence: Total conduit capacity. C1: CCapat, C2 = (0.8*$P$2) * (1 + A2* 0.000027397), C3 = C2 + C2 * $P$3* MAX (MIN (1 - ((C2/ 12 + 0.001)/$P$3, 1) , 0)/365 * (A3 - A2)..."

In Issue 3 of Interregnum, Peter Maranci was not very impressed, commenting, "Chessboards is not really a bad work. The author is clearly intelligent and literate; the technical aspects of the writing are good. The subject of planes has certainly never been covered in such detail in a roleplaying product before. There are some good and amusing ideas included. But Chessboards is not particularly a leap forward for roleplaying, because it really has no purpose." Maranci noted the lack of tables for randomly creating a plane, saying, "When I have to come up with a new plane fast I'd much rather roll a few dice on a table, or even look at concise lists of options rather than read through page after pages of exposition." Maranci also questioned what audience the book was designed for, since "hack & slashers" wouldn't take the time to read through the book and experienced gamers were unlikely to need this book. Maranci concluded by giving the book a grade of C+, writing, "The book is an interesting read, but there's better reading material available at a much more reasonable price."
