= Legend of the Five Rings (disambiguation) =

Legend of the Five Rings is a fictional setting based on feudal Japan and currently controlled by Fantasy Flight Games.

Legend of the Five Rings may also refer to:

- Legend of the Five Rings (collectible card game), a collectible-card game set in the Legend of the Five Rings setting
- Legend of the Five Rings Roleplaying Game, a role-playing game set in the Legend of the Five Rings setting
- Legend of the Five Rings: The Card Game (living card game), a living card game set in the Legend of the Five Rings setting

== See also ==
- The Book of Five Rings, the treatise on swordsmanship by Miyamoto Musashi
