= April Lee =

Artist

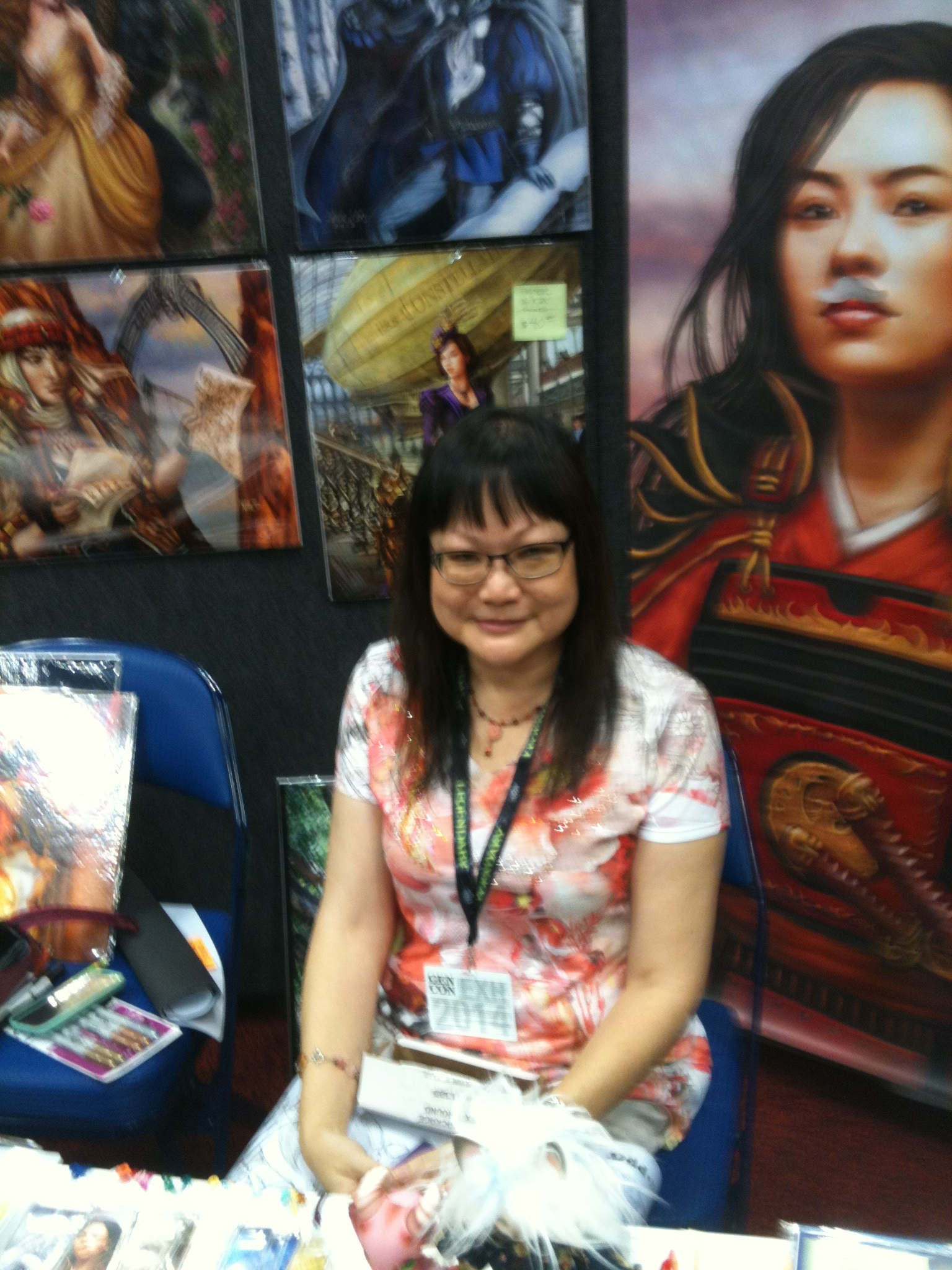
- Known for: Fantasy art

April Lee is an artist whose work has appeared in role-playing games, collectible card games, and PC games.

== Education ==
She graduated from Art Center College of Design with a BFA in illustration. Oxford University, St. Hilda's College (Eng/Hist). Mount Holyoke College, A.B.

== Career ==
Her collectible card game work includes artwork for Galactic Empires (1994), Legend of the Five Rings (1995-2012), Shadowfist (1995), Middle-earth Collectible Card Game (1995), Doomtown (1998), Legend of the Burning Sands (1998), Warlord: Saga of the Storm (2001), Warhammer 40,000 Collectible Card Game (2001), and Warcry (2003).

She has done artwork for Magic: The Gathering collectible card game (1997).

Her PC game work includes art credits on Might and Magic (1998), and Heroes of Might and Magic (2003-2011).
