= List of Legend of the Five Rings sets =

This is a list of the card sets for the Legend of the Five Rings collectible card game ("L5R") published by AEG. L5R is marketed through base sets and expansion sets. Base sets are typically composed primarily of reprinted cards from prior sets with a smaller number of new cards. Expansion sets (which are smaller than base sets) are composed entirely of new cards. Cards are sold in 60-90 card semi-randomized starter decks and booster packs which have a smaller number (typically 11 or 15) of random cards. Starters feature a particular faction, including new fixed rarity cards and a Stronghold card for that faction. They also include cards from previous sets and are intended to be fully playable decks.

In addition to starters and boosters, there is also the occasional "learn to play" set containing two fixed decks and an expanded rulebook for new players and a fixed "direct to player" set unavailable except directly from AEG.

For the purpose of tournament format/legality and the storyline, L5R's sets are divided into "arcs". From the beginning of the game's second arc with Jade Edition, cards have featured a "bug" (a kanji approximation of the edition's name) in a lower corner of the card's text box showing that card's legality. The only cards legal at most official tournaments are those printed with the current bug (or earlier printings of those cards). These bugs are shown next to each arc's title.

Originally, sets were differentiated by the color of their borders. From Gold Edition on, cards have an expansion code, card number, and rarity symbol listed on their lower edge. The rarity symbols are circle for common, diamond for uncommon, star for rare, triangle for promo, hollow diamond for "premium" (bonus cards found in Emperor Edition and later boosters), and star within a circle for fixed cards.

== Clan Wars ==
Set	Release date	Featured Factions	Size	Border	Notes
Pre-Imperial	8/1995	-	84	Red-Orange unbroken line	Cards made available at GenCon prior to commercial release.
Imperial Edition	10/1995	Crab, Crane, Dragon, Lion, Phoenix, Unicorn	309	Yellow-Red broken line	First base set. Included "Ancestral Swords" for each clan.
Shadowlands	5/1996	Naga, Scorpion	155	Purple & Green swirls	
Forbidden Knowledge	8/1996	-	150	Rust-colored swirls	Introduced Region card type and Ritual spells.
Emerald Edition	8/1996	Same as Imperial Edition	312	Black marble	Second base set. Included "Ancestral Armors" for each clan.
Battle of Beiden Pass	11/1996	Crab, Dragon	118	Black	"Learn to Play" boxed set.
Anvil of Despair	12/1996	Junzo's Horde, Toturi's Army	152	Blue swirls	Introduced Ancestor card type.
Crimson & Jade	4/1997	Brotherhood, Yoritomo's Alliance	161	Green	Introduced Kiho card type.
Obsidian Edition	8/1997	Same as Imperial Edition	312	Brown marble	Third base set. Included "Ancestral Standards" for each clan. Introduced actual cards for Strongholds, instead of using back of deck box.
Time of the Void	9/1997	Crab, Phoenix	229	Brown with white cracks	Included "story-backed" stronghold cards for the twelve factions at the uncommon rarity level.
Scorpion Clan Coup, Scroll 1	12/1997	Scorpion	53	Black with red cracks	"Prequel" expansion, released in 3 monthly installments as part of the "Rolling Thunder" campaign. These did not have rares.
Scorpion Clan Coup, Scroll 2	1/1998	-	50	"	
Scorpion Clan Coup, Scroll 3	2/1998	Lion	52	"	
Promotional Cards	Various	-	28	Golden waves	

== Hidden Emperor - "Jade" ==
With Jade Edition, L5R introduced the concept of "arc legality". Newly printed cards were now marked with a "Jade bug". This allowed tournament rules to limit the card base allowed to be used: either "Strict Jade" in which only cards with the bug were legal or "Extended Jade" in which all Actions, Followers, Items, Kihos, and Regions were legal but all other types were required to have the bug.

Set	Release date	Featured Factions	Size	Border	Notes
Jade Edition	5/1998	Brotherhood, Crab, Crane, Dragon, Lion, Naga, Phoenix, Scorpion, Shadowlands, Toturi's Army, Unicorn, Yoritomo's Alliance	330	Green waves	Fourth base set. Included "Clan Charters" for each clan.
The Hidden Emperor, Episode 1	6/1998	Naga	52	Wood grain	The Hidden Emperor expansion was released in small monthly episodes as part of the "Rolling Thunder" campaign. These had two levels of uncommon rather than true rares.
The Hidden Emperor, Episode 2	7/1998	Dragon	52	Wood grain	
The Hidden Emperor, Episode 3	8/1998	Monk	52	Wood grain	
The Hidden Emperor, Episode 4	9/1998	Unicorn	52	Wood grain	
The Hidden Emperor, Episode 5	10/1998	Mantis	52	Wood grain	
The Hidden Emperor, Episode 6	11/1998	Crane	52	Wood grain	
The Hidden Emperor: The Dark Journey Home	2/1999	Ninja, Phoenix, Toturi's Army	154	Wood grain	
Pearl Edition	5/1999	Same as Jade Edition	364	Purple ripples	Fifth base set. First to feature revised card design. Included "Clan Weapons" for each clan.
Siege of Sleeping Mountain	5/1999	Brotherhood & Dragon, Naga & Toturi's Army	64	Red-Green ovals	"Learn to Play" set including two pairs of decks.
Honor Bound	6/1999	Crab, Scorpion, Shadowlands	173	Red whorls	Introduced Sensei card type. Included "Clan War Saga" foils reprinting older cards.
Ambition's Debt	11/1999	Lion, Naga, Shadowlands	180	Dark blue whorls	Included "Clan War Saga" foils reprinting older cards.
Fire & Shadow	3/2000	Brotherhood, Dragon, Yoritomo's Alliance	186	Olive whorls	Included "Clan War Saga" foils reprinting older cards.
Top Deck Booster	3/2000	-	20	Black	Simplified cards included in demo booster for Top Deck Magazine.
Heroes of Rokugan	5/2000	-	27	Golden spheres	First direct to player set. Packaged in cloth covered box and binder. These cards also had the Gold bug.
Soul of the Empire	6/2000	Crane, Toturi's Army, Unicorn	200	Dark green whorls	Included token cards with red backs. Included "story-backed" stronghold cards for the thirteen legal factions at the uncommon rarity level.
Storms Over Matsu Palace	6/2000	Lion, Unicorn	55	Black and red	"Learn to Play" set.
Spirit Wars	11/2000	Lion, Phoenix, Spirit	197	Thick red diagonal lines	Some cards in this set also featured the Gold bug. First set to feature new card backs.
Promotional Cards	Various	-	51	Golden lines on black	

== Four Winds - "Gold" ==
With the new Gold Edition, AEG reduced the number of factions in the game from 14 to 8 by removing the Brotherhood, Naga, Ninja, Spirit, Toturi's Army, and Yoritomo's Alliance factions. The Mantis and Ratling factions were then introduced in expansions later in the block, bringing the total to 10. All sets in this arc included random foil versions of rare cards.

Set	Release date	Featured Factions	Size	Code	Notes
Gold Edition	6/2001	Crab, Crane, Dragon, Lion, Phoenix, Scorpion, Shadowlands, Unicorn	541	GE	Sixth base set. Introduced Wind card type. Included "Celestial Swords" for each clan.
A Perfect Cut	9/2001	Crab, Crane, Scorpion	155	APC	
An Oni's Fury	12/2001	Dragon, Shadowlands, Unicorn	156	AOF	Reprints in this set are not marked with an expansion code.
Dark Allies	4/2002	Lion, Mantis, Phoenix	161	DA	Yoritomo's Alliance Officially Changed To Mantis Clan
The L5R Experience	6/2002	Crane, Scorpion	62	L5R EXP.	Free "Learn to Play" set.
Broken Blades	8/2002	Crab, Scorpion, Unicorn	156	BB	
1,000 Years of Darkness	9/2002	-	94	KYD	Direct to player set. Included binder. Some cards also had Diamond bug.
The Fall of Otosan Uchi	12/2002	Crane, Dragon, Mantis	156	FOU	Cards also had Diamond bug.
Heaven & Earth	4/2003	Lion, Phoenix, Shadowlands	157	H&E	Cards also had Diamond bug.
Winds of Change	8/2003	Crab, Mantis, Ratling	155	WoC	Cards also had Diamond bug.
Promotional Cards	Various	-	100	Various	

== Rain of Blood - "Diamond" ==
Set	Release date	Featured Factions	Size	Code	Notes
Diamond Edition	10/2003	Crab, Crane, Dragon, Lion, Mantis, Phoenix, Ratling, Scorpion, Shadowlands, Unicorn	487	DE	Seventh base set. Included "Celestial Swords" for each clan.
Training Grounds	11/2003	Lion, Shadowlands	95	TG	"Learn to play" set.
Reign of Blood	12/2003	Dragon, Phoenix, Unicorn	157	RoB	
The Hidden City	4/2004	Crab, Lion, Ratling	156	HC	
Wrath of the Emperor	8/2004	Crane, Scorpion, Shadowlands	156	WotE	
Dawn of the Empire	11/2004	-	108	DotE	Direct to player set. Included binder. Most cards also had Lotus bug.
Web of Lies	12/2004	Mantis, Phoenix, Unicorn	156	WoL	Cards also had Lotus bug.
Enemy of My Enemy	4/2005	Crab, Dragon, Ratling	156	EoME	Cards also had Lotus bug.
Code of Bushido	8/2005	Crane, Lion, Scorpion	156	CoB	Cards also had Lotus bug.
Promotional Cards	Various	-	126	Various	

== Age of Enlightenment - "Lotus" ==
Set	Release date	Featured Factions	Size	Code	Notes
Lotus Edition	10/2005	Crab, Crane, Dragon, Lion, Mantis, Phoenix, Ratling, Scorpion, Shadowlands, Unicorn	500	LE	Eighth base set. Included "Clan Swords" for each clan. All cards in the Crane starter deck were initially released separately in an all-foil deck to commemorate 2005 GenCon victory.
Path of Hope	1/2006	Crab, Crane, Shadowlands	156	PoH	
Drums of War	5/2006	Dragon, Lion, Unicorn	156	DoW	
Training Grounds 2	7/2006	Crane, Dragon	112	TG2	"Learn to Play" set.
Test of Enlightenment	7/2006	-	124	ToE	Direct to player set.
Rise of the Shogun	9/2006	Mantis, Phoenix, Scorpion	156	RotS	
Khan's Defiance	1/2007	Crab, Crane, Ratling	156	KD	Cards also had Samurai bug.
Tomorrow	3/2007	Ratling	56	Tomorrow	Cards also had Samurai bug, All foil set including the 2006 World Championship deck and 21 new cards.
The Truest Test	5/2007	Dragon, Spider, Unicorn	156	TTT	Cards also had Samurai bug.
Promotional Cards	Various	-	92	Various	

== Race for the Throne - "Samurai" ==
The Ratling faction was removed, and the Shadowlands faction became the Spider Clan, although not all Shadowlands cards transitioned. This brought the total faction count to 9, establishing the factions that have been in play since.

Set	Release date	Featured Factions	Size	Code	Notes
Samurai Edition	7/2007	Crab, Crane, Dragon, Lion, Mantis, Phoenix, Scorpion, Spider, Unicorn	412	Samurai	Ninth base set. Included unique armors for each clan.
Stronger than Steel	10/2007	Lion, Mantis, Phoenix	157	STS	
Test of the Emerald and Jade Championships	12/2007	-	52	E&JC	Direct to player set.
Honor's Veil	2/2008	Crane, Dragon, Scorpion	156	HV	
Words and Deeds	5/2008	Crab, Spider, Unicorn	166	W&D	
Samurai Edition Banzai		Same as Samurai Edition			Tenth base set. Reprint of Samurai Edition with bonus rares from expansions. Cards had a 2008 copyright date instead of 2007; rares from other expansions included a star symbol but no set numbers.
The Heaven's Will	10/2008	Dragon, Lion, Mantis	166	THW	
Glory of the Empire	1/2009	Crab, Crane, Phoenix	166	GotE	Dual Bug (Samurai & Celestial). First to feature revised card design.
The Imperial Gift 1	1/2009	-	28	Imperial Gift I	Free expansion, Dual Bug (Samural & Celestial)
Death at Koten	4/2009	-	84	DaK	Direct to player set, Dual Bug (Samurai & Celestial)
Promotional Cards	Various	-	257	Various	

== Destroyer War - "Celestial" ==
Set	Release date	Featured Factions	Size	Code	Notes
Celestial Edition	6/2009	Crab, Crane, Dragon, Lion, Mantis, Phoenix, Scorpion, Spider, Unicorn	395	Celestial	Eleventh base set. Included heavenly weapons for each clan.
The Imperial Gift 2	8/2009	-	82	IG 2	Free expansion. Packaged as two unaligned decks, with some cards reprinted from other Celestial-legal expansions, designed to be played against each other.
Path of the Destroyer	8/2009	Scorpion, Spider, Unicorn	166	PotD	Introduces Celestial card type.
The Harbinger	1/2010	Dragon, Mantis, Phoenix	176	TH	
Celestial Edition 15	3/2010	Same as Celestial Edition	154	CE 15	Twelfth base set. Reprint of Celestial Edition including bonus rares from earlier expansions, a non-legal "Flashback" reprint of an earlier card, and a "Celestial Mempo" for each clan.
The Plague War	5/2010	Crab, Crane, Lion	176	TPW	
The Imperial Gift 3	8/2010	-	44	Imperial Gift 3	Free expansion
Battle of Kyuden Tonbo	9/2010	Dragon, Lion	91	BoKT	"Learn to Play" set
Empire at War	9/2010	Dragon, Scorpion, Unicorn	176	EaW	
The Dead of Winter	1/2011	Crane, Mantis, Spider	164	TDoW	
Before the Dawn	5/2011	Crab, Lion, Phoenix	156	BtD	Dual Bug (Celestial & Emperor)
Forgotten Legacy	7/2011	-	90	FL	Direct to player set, Dual Bug (Celestial & Emperor), 6 "Eternity" bug cards
Second City	9/2011	Dragon, Mantis, Scorpion	156	SC	Dual Bug (Celestial & Emperor)
Promotional Cards	Various	-	142	Various	

== Age of Conquest - "Emperor" ==
Set	Release date	Featured Factions	Size	Code	Notes
Emperor Edition	2/2012	Crab, Crane, Dragon, Lion, Mantis, Phoenix, Scorpion, Spider, Unicorn	428	EE	Thirteenth base set. Included new family House Guards and a Celestial for each clan.
Embers of War	5/2012	Lion, Spider, Unicorn	159	EoW	
The Shadow's Embrace	7/2012	Crab, Crane, Phoenix	159	TSE	Factory Set
Seeds of Decay	10/2012	Dragon, Mantis, Scorpion	159	SoD	
Honor and Treachery	12/2012	Phoenix, Scorpion	84	HaT	"Learn to Play" set
Emperor Edition: Gempukku	1/2013	Same as Emperor Edition	18	EE Gempukku	Reprinted cards from BtD, SC, EE, EoW, SoD. Boosters contained rares only. Starter decks included an Experienced Personality for each clan, decided upon by a player vote from the Emperor Edition starters, as well as a card-draw Holding for each clan.
Torn Asunder	2/2013	-	156	TA	The first expansion not to include featured clan starter decks since Forbidden Knowledge.
Coils of Madness	5/2013	-	147	CoM	Dual Bug (Emperor & Ivory), switches to new Emperor bug. Factory set includes all cards (including Emperor-legal only) except nine Premium rarity Personalities. Booster packs include only Ivory-legal cards, including full-bleed art versions of non-Unique cards, and foil versions of Unique cards.
Gates of Chaos	9/2013	-	150	GoC	Dual Bug (Emperor & Ivory). First expansion to include foil rares since The Heaven's Will.
Aftermath	12/2013	-	150	AM	Dual Bug (Emperor & Ivory)
Promotional Cards	Various	-	264	Various	

== A Brother's Destiny - "Ivory" ==
Set	Release date	Featured Factions	Size	Code	Notes
A Matter of Honor	12/18/2013	Crab, Lion	55	AMoH	"Learn to Play" set
Ivory Edition	03/24/2014	Crab, Crane, Dragon, Lion, Mantis, Phoenix, Scorpion, Spider, Unicorn	372	Ivory	Fourteenth base set. Reintroduced Sensei card type. Included experienced "Ancestral Armors" for each clan. Marks the switch from expansions using 11-card booster packs to 16-card booster packs, to foster L5R Draft tournament environment.
The Coming Storm	06/09/2014	-	185	TCS	
A Line in the Sand	09/28/2014	-	156	ALitS	
The New Order	12/01/2014	-	156	TNO	
The Currency of War	01/05/2015	Crane, Mantis	57	TCW	"Learn to Play" set
Twenty Festivals	03/27/2015	Same as Ivory Edition	372	20F	Dual Bug (Ivory & Onyx). Fifteenth base set.
Thunderous Acclaim	07/21/2015	-	156	THA	Dual Bug (Ivory & Onyx).
Evil Portents	11/09/2015	-	165	EP	Dual Bug (Ivory & Onyx).
The Blackest Storm	Digital 2018	-	168	TBS	Dual Bug (Ivory & Onyx).

== Onyx Edition ==
Set	Release date	Featured Factions	Size	Code	Notes
Hidden Forest War	Digital 2023	Akasha, Spider	82	HFW	"Learn to Play" set
Onyx Edition	Digital 2023	Akasha, Crab, Crane, Dragon, Lion, Phoenix, Scorpion, Spider, Unicorn	387	Onyx	Sixteenth base set. Completed and released by "Onyx Lives!" Project by some of the original CCG Designers. Dual Bug (Onyx & Shattered Empire).
Rise of Jigoku	Digital 2023	-	166	RoJ	Completed and released by "Onyx Lives!" Project by some of the original CCG Designers. Dual Bug (Onyx & Shattered Empire).
Road to Ruin	Digital 2023	-	157	RtR	Completed and released by "Onyx Lives!" Project by some of the original CCG Designers. Dual Bug (Onyx & Shattered Empire).
Rise of Otosan Uchi	Digital 2023	-	166	RoU	Completed and released by "Onyx Lives!" Project by some of the original CCG Designers. Dual Bug (Onyx & Shattered Empire).

== Shattered Empire ==
Set	Release date	Featured Factions	Size	Code	Notes
Gathering Storms	Digital 3/2024	Mantis	53	GS	Released by "Onyx Lives!" Project by some of the original CCG Designers.
Chaos Reigns Part I	Digital 5/2024	-	54	CRI	Released by "Onyx Lives!" Project by some of the original CCG Designers.
Gates of Tengoku	Digital 9/2024	-	101	GoT	Released by "Onyx Lives!" Project by some of the original CCG Designers.
Shattered Empire	Digital 2/2025	Akasha, Crab, Crane, Dragon, Lion, Mantis, Phoenix, Scorpion, Spider, Unicorn	396	ShE	Seventeenth base set. Released by "Onyx Lives!" Project by some of the original CCG Designers.
Chaos Reigns Part II	Digital 5/2025	Sparrow	82	CRII	Released by "Onyx Lives!" Project by some of the original CCG Designers.
Chaos Reigns Part III	Digital 12/2025	-	135	CRIII	Released by "Onyx Lives!" Project by some of the original CCG Designers.

== Three Dynasties ==
Set	Release date	Featured Factions	Size	Code	Notes
Three Dynasties	Digital (Fall 2026)	TBD	502	3D	Eighteenth base set. Released by "Onyx Lives!" Project by some of the original CCG Designers.

== Other ==
Set	Release date	Featured Factions	Size	Code	Notes
War of Honor	6/2011	Dragon, Lion, Phoenix, Scorpion	127	WoH	Self-contained multiplayer L5R variant. Some cards in this game had the Celestial and/or Emperor bugs.
Siege: Heart of Darkness	9/2014	Dark Naga, Mantis, Phoenix, Scorpion	41	S:HoD	Self-contained cooperative L5R variant, with multiple players opposing a challenge deck piloted by another player. The Dark Naga challenge deck includes new cards with no arc legality; the three pre-constructed decks include cards legal throughout the Ivory arc, from Coils of Madness through A Line in the Sand. Introduces Clock and Territory card types, which are only relevant to the Siege format.
Siege: Clan War	9/2015	Yogo Junzo, Brotherhood of Shinsei, Toturi’s Army, Yoritomo’s Alliance	77	S:CW	Another Siege variant. Yogo Junzo deck includes new cards with no arc legality; the three pre-constructed decks include cards legal throughout the 20F Arc, from Ivory Edition through Evil Portents, 9 new cards and one reprinted card, Productive Mine, with Onyx legality only. Also contains Clock and Territory card types, which are only relevant to the Siege format.
