= Pawns: The Opening Move =

1992 role-playing supplement for The Primal Order published by Wizards of the Coast

Pawns: The Opening Move is a 1992 role-playing supplement for The Primal Order published by Wizards of the Coast.

== Contents ==
Pawns: The Opening Move is a supplement in which divine minions are detailed.

== Publication history ==
Shannon Appelcline noted that for The Primal Order, "Three supplements - Pawns (1992), Knights (1993) and Chessboards (1993) - quickly followed that premiere release. From there, Wizards began to expand upon their multisystem ideas." Pawns was the first supplement to The Primal Order.

== Reception ==
Gene Alloway reviewed Pawns: The Opening Move in White Wolf #36 (1993), rating it a 2 out of 5 and stated that "Pawns is an interesting sourcebook that almost makes it. It doesn't add rules, but it does provide a lot of ideas and possibly material for a campaign. To be honest, its usefulness is limited due to the strong links the minions have to deities on which the reader has little or no information, and who are acting in worlds the reader again does not know. If you have a campaign where the gods are already developed, this is not for you. If you are designing a new world, then you should find this well-done work helpful."

== Reviews ==
- Journeys: Journal of Multidimensional Roleplaying #6
- Grey Worlds (Volume 1, Issue 3–Aug 1994)
- The Last Province (Issue 4–June / July 1993)
