= Pivot (card game) =

The Up-Down Card Game
- Designers: André François
- Publishers: Wizards of the Coast
- Players: 2 to 8
- Setup time: negligible (under 1 minute)
- Playing time: 20 minutes
- Chance: medium
- Age range: 10 to Adult
- Skills: Counting, understanding of left and right

Pivot is a casual card game released by Wizards of the Coast in 1998. The game was designed by André François. Pivot, along with Alpha Blitz, Go Wild!, and Twitch, were part of a move by Wizards of the Coast to diversify beyond their core Magic: The Gathering property. This game is no longer in print.

There are 108 cards in a Pivot deck:
80 Number cards (numbered 1 - 80)
28 Direction cards (11 Up, 11 Down, and 6 Pivot)

The object of the game is to be the first player to get rid of all of their own selves cards. Before playing all players need to get around in a circle, It it suggested to put the number cards and Direction cards into two separate pile.

When playing, Play proceeds around the circle according to the direction indicated by the most recently played Direction card. The Direction cards also determine which Number cards can be played next. An Up Direction card allows a Number card with a value higher than the last played Number card, while a Down Direction card allows one with a lower value. The Pivot Direction card can be played to reverse the current direction. On their turn, a player may play a valid Number card or a Direction card. If they cannot play a card, the player must draw one card from the draw pile and end their turn.

For example, if the direction is Up and the last played Number card was 42, valid plays are any Number card higher than 42, a Down card, or a Pivot card (which would have the same effect as a Down card).
