= Peter Adkison =

American game designer and businessman

Peter D. Adkison
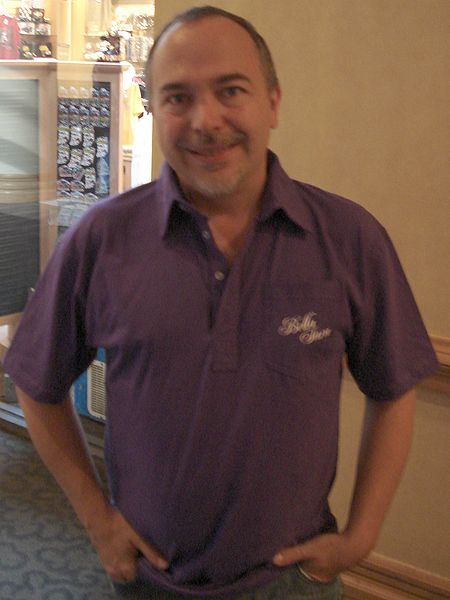
- Adkison at Gen Con Indy 2007
- Education: Walla Walla College; University of Washington
- Occupations: CEO, Owner of Gen Con

Peter D. Adkison is an American game designer and businessman best known as the founder of Wizards of the Coast. He served as the company's chief executive officer from 1993 to 2001. Adkison is the current owner of Gen Con, a major yearly game convention in the Midwest.

During Adkison's tenure, Wizards of the Coast rose to the status of a major publisher in the hobby game industry. Wizards achieved success with its creation of Magic: the Gathering, which started the collectible card game genre. It also distributed the Pokémon trading cards, and later acquired TSR, publisher of the Dungeons & Dragons role-playing game, releasing a successful new edition.

In 1999, Adkison sold Wizards of the Coast to Hasbro, remaining with the company until January 2001.

As a longtime fan of role-playing games (RPGs), Adkison has become an advocate for indie RPGs. His own game design work includes The Primal Order, a "capstone system" for use with any of a number of different role-playing games.

== Background ==
As a child, Adkison enjoyed playing strategy games and war games. In 1978, he was exposed to Dungeons & Dragons, which "blew [him] away." His friend, Terry Campbell, suggested the idea of starting a game company to Adkison and his friends using the name "Wizards of the Coast", taken from a guild of which one of their player characters was a member.

In the early 1980s, Adkison self-published a wargame to be used with fantasy role-playing games titled Castles & Conquest, utilizing the "Wizards of the Coast" name as a brand. In 1981, he created a Dungeons & Dragons campaign titled Chaldea, which he continues to run today.

As of 2002, Adkison was running two Dungeons & Dragons campaigns and playing in three. He enjoys a wide variety of games including Magic: the Gathering, Twitch, The Settlers of Catan, Robo Rally, Call of Cthulhu, Vampire: The Masquerade, and the Legend of the Five Rings Roleplaying Game.

While working at Hidden City Games, his public biography from 2005 claimed that he was married to Melissa Reis Adkison.

In 2014, Adkison married Dee Fenton.

== Career ==
Adkison received a Bachelor of Science degree in Computer Science from Walla Walla College in 1985. He also has an MBA degree from the University of Washington. From 1985 to 1991, he worked as a systems analyst for Boeing.

While working for Boeing, he became involved in the founding of Wizards of the Coast. Adkison suggested to his friend, Ken McGlothlen, that they start a company, and Wizards of the Coast was soon founded on May 23, 1990. The company immediately began working on its first project, The Primal Order by Adkison, although it was not released until April 1992. Adkison asked game designer Richard Garfield to develop a game that would be cheaper to produce than the board game RoboRally that Garfield had proposed; Garfield developed his idea to combine a concept like baseball cards with a card game into what would eventually become Magic: The Gathering (1993). With that game's success, Adkison began working full-time for Wizards of the Coast. TSR was facing financial insolvency in 1996, so Ryan Dancey of Five Rings Publishing Group arranged a deal for Adkison to purchase TSR, and thus Wizards of the Coast announced their purchase of TSR on April 10, 1997. Adkison paid approximately US$30 million to purchase TSR, including the payment of its debts, and also purchased Five Rings Publishing as part of this deal. Adkison appointed Mary Kirchoff to manage the book publishing division of TSR, and made Bill Slavicsek the head of role-playing game research and development; he also made Lisa Stevens the brand manager for the RPGA and Greyhawk, and put Ryan Dancey over the business and marketing concerns of TSR. Adkison improved the relationships between TSR with Gary Gygax and Dave Arneson by making favorable financial and legal arrangements with them. Adkison also restored the relationships between TSR with the authors Margaret Weis, Tracy Hickman, and R.A. Salvatore. Adkison was planning a third edition of Dungeons & Dragons even during the acquisition of TSR, and put Bill Slavicsek in charge of the design team, later naming Jonathan Tweet the new project leader for third edition. Adkison was a longtime friend of Christian Moore from Last Unicorn Games, and when that company was having its own financial troubles, Wizards of the Coast purchased it in July 2000.

Peter Adkison at Origins Game Fair 2003

Hasbro purchased Wizards of the Coast in 1999. Adkison began working on a Dungeons & Dragons MMORPG based on a design from Richard Garfield and Skaff Elias. According to game designer Ed Stark, Adkison said, "Look, computer gaming is the future of roleplaying. We've got to get involved in this." However, Hasbro folded up the rights for D&D computer games into Hasbro Interactive and then sold them to Infogrames, leaving Wizards unable to publish D&D computer games; Adkison therefore submitted his resignation, which became effective December 31, 2000. In January 2001, Adkison sold Wizards of the Coast to Hasbro and entered "semi-retirement", engaging in rock-climbing and "lying around". In May 2002, Adkison purchased Gen Con from Hasbro, which he had been attending since 1992. Adkison says he has "always loved" Gen Con.

As of 2005, Adkison is the CEO of Hidden City Games, publishers of the Bella Sara collectible card game for girls. As of 2013, he has started a production company known as Hostile Work Environment LLC.

== Accolades ==
In 1999, Pyramid magazine named Peter Adkison as one of The Millennium's Most Influential Persons "at least in the realm of adventure gaming".
