= C-23 (card game) =

Collectible card game by Wizards of the Coast

- Card back to C-23 CCG
- Designers: Charlie Catinus, Mike Davis, Skaff Elias, Richard Garfield, Joe Grace, Jim Lin, and Joel Mick
- Publishers: Wizards of the Coast
- Players: 2 or more
- Setup time: < 5 minutes
- Playing time: < 60 minutes

C-23, also known as Jim Lee's C-23, is an out-of-print collectible card game by Wizards of the Coast based on the comic book by Jim Lee, that was new at the time. The game was first released in April 1998. The original set had 162 cards. It was the first game released using the ARC System. The game is a simplified Deckmaster system with four different card types: Resource, Character, Combat, and Action. The ARC System allowed C-23 to be played with Xena: Warrior Princess and Hercules: The Legendary Journeys.

The premise of the game is to play as HyperShock troopers trying to reclaim the Earth's surface back from humanoid insects called the Angelans.

The game failed and Jim Lee soon left the self-publishing business. The planned expansion set called the Uprising never materialized.

== World champions ==
Year	Champion
1999	Bertrand Mayer (France) - Essen (Internationale Spieltage)

== Reviews ==
- Syfy
