= Xena: Warrior Princess (card game) =

1998 collectible card game

- Cardback of Xena card game
- Designers: Charlie Catinus, Mike Davis, Skaff Elias, Richard Garfield, Joe Grace, Jim Lin, and Joel Mick
- Publishers: Wizards of the Coast
- Players: 2 or more
- Setup time: < 5 minutes
- Playing time: < 60 minutes

Xena: Warrior Princess is an out-of-print collectible card game by Wizards of the Coast based on the Xena: Warrior Princess television series. It was released in May 1998. The original set had 180 cards and an expansion called Battle Cry was released in September 1998 consisting of 75 cards. It was the second game released using the ARC System. The game is a simplified Deckmaster system with four different card types: Resource, Character, Combat, and Action. The ARC System allowed Xena: Warrior Princess to be played with C-23 and Hercules: The Legendary Journeys.

== World champions ==
Year	Champion
1999	Bertrand Mayer (France) - Essen (Internationale Spieltage)

== Reception ==
In a January 1999 review for the Polish magazine Świat Gier Komputerowych, Michał Nowakowski gave Xena: Warrior Princess an overall rating of 4/10. He praised the clarity of its rules, awarding them 10/10, and considered the card presentation reasonably attractive (7/10). However, he criticized the gameplay as shallow and repetitive (3/10), arguing that the mechanics offered little strategic depth and that the distinctions between different categories of cards had limited impact on play. He found the game considerably less engaging than other contemporary collectible card games, judging Xena to be a simplified and lackluster version of Star Wars and Magic: The Gathering, and ultimately recommended against purchasing it.

Other reviews:

- InQuest Gamer #40
- Realms of Fantasy
