= Shadowveil: Legend of the Five Rings =

2025 rogue-like strategy video game

- Developer: Palindrome Interactive
- Publishers: Palindrome Interactive, Amplifier Studios, THQ Nordic
- Series: Legend of the Five Rings
- Platform: Windows
- Release: March 4, 2025
- Genres: Rogue-like, strategy, adventure
- Mode: Single-player

Shadowveil: Legend of the Five Rings is a rogue-like strategy video game developed and published by Palindrome Interactive together with Amplifier Studios and THQ Nordic. It was released on Steam on March 4, 2025. The game is based on the 1995 Legend of the Five Rings roleplaying fantasy franchise.

== Gameplay ==
The player plays as the commander of an army of samurai, making an expedition into Shadowlands - a dangerous, corrupted wasteland. During the journey, the player can find different cards that represent abilities that units can use during combat, which is an auto-battle. Between expeditions, the player can upgrade, recruit, and contact the different families of clans to gather support and reach specific goals.

== Reception ==
Reviewers noted, that one of the advantages of the game is that it does not assume familiarity with the original universe. Others highlighted that "The RPG elements had surprising depth", that the fans of the original franchise would enjoy the game and that the game has high replayability.
