= MLB Showdown =

Collectible card game

- MLB Showdown logo
- Publishers: Wizards of the Coast
- Years active: 2000–2005
- Genres: Collectible card game Dice game
- Players: 2
- Setup time: < 5 minutes
- Playing time: < 30 minutes
- Chance: High^{1}
- Age range: 10 and up
- Skills: Card playing Some knowledge of baseball
- 1: Due to the 20-sided die

MLB Showdown (colloq. Showdown) is an out-of-print collectible card game made by Wizards of the Coast that ran from April 2000 to 2005. The game was introduced to the public in 2000, featuring Atlanta Braves third baseman Chipper Jones on the product cover. Subsequent cover athletes included Shawn Green, Gary Sheffield, Manny Ramírez, Luis Gonzalez, Torii Hunter, Albert Pujols, and Craig Biggio.

== Gameplay ==
Original MLB Showdown Logo

MLB Showdown simulates baseball through a card game, with heavy randomness. It involves a 20-sided die and cards made specifically for the game. These cards were available in booster packs, a staple of collectible card games, as well as starter packs and draft packs. There are two types of cards: player cards (current and former Major League players) and strategy cards (actions that can add to or subtract from dice rolls, change results, draw extra cards, etc.)

The outcome of an at-bat largely depends on the player cards. The player whose pitcher is pitching that turn rolls a die to determine whether the batting player rolls on the pitcher's chart or the batter's chart. Each of the two charts has a list of possible results from the at-bat.

Beginning in 2002, the formulas were revamped, especially for batter cards, which now allowed for more rolls on batters' charts, but less variation from chart to chart. On the fan blog The Greatest MLB Showdown Project, contributor David Bush argued that the extreme outlier performance of Barry Bonds beginning in the 2001 MLB season forced game designers to make the changes to the formula, as previous construction was unable to reasonably reflect Bonds' statistics.

== Organized play ==
The organized play was set into three levels: local leagues, regionals, and the national championship. The MLB Showdown card game had four national champions: Scott Forster (2001), Gary Quinn (2002), Keith Pioro (2003), and Terry Dugan (2004).

For the 2005 season, the national championship was set as a different format than previously because of changes in organized play. Eight players were regional champions only and won the grand prize of MLB season tickets to the team of his/her choice. However, Wizards of the Coast eventually approved a national championship in Houston, Texas. Prizes were reduced to merely autographed memorabilia sent in from Wizards of the Coast. Four players, Stephen Mendel, Ben Taylor, Jonathan Rose, and Daniel Rosen, split the tournament and were named national champions of the 2005 season.

There was no formal organized after Showdown was discontinued by Wizards of the Coast in January 2006.

== Sets ==
| Year | Set | Type of card | # of cards |
|---|---|---|---|
| 2000 | Base | Player | 462 |
| 2000 | Base | Strategy | 55 |
| 2000 | Pennant Run | Player | 150 |
| 2000 | Pennant Run | Strategy | 25 |
| 2000 | Spring Training Promo | Player | 34 |
| 2000 | Home Run Hitter Promo | Player | 14 |
| 2000 | Pennant Run Promo | Player | 8 |
| 2001 | Base | Player | 462 |
| 2001 | Base | Strategy | 75 |
| 2001 | Pennant Run | Player | 175 |
| 2001 | Pennant Run | Strategy | 25 |
| 2001 | MLB Showdown 2001 Promo | Player | 34 |
| 2001 | Ace Pitchers Promo | Player | 16 |
| 2002 | Base | Player | 356 |
| 2002 | Base | Strategy | 50 |
| 2002 | Trading Deadline | Player | 150 |
| 2002 | Trading Deadline | Strategy | 25 |
| 2002 | Pennant Run | Player | 150 |
| 2002 | Pennant Run | Strategy | 25 |
| 2002 | All-Star Game | Player | 50 |
| 2003 | Base | Player | 304 |
| 2003 | Base | Strategy | 50 |
| 2003 | Trading Deadline | Player | 145 |
| 2003 | Trading Deadline | Strategy | 25 |
| 2003 | Pennant Run | Player | 125 |
| 2003 | Pennant Run | Strategy | 25 |
| 2004 | Base | Player | 348 |
| 2004 | Base | Strategy | 50 |
| 2004 | Trading Deadline | Player | 125 |
| 2004 | Trading Deadline | Strategy | 25 |
| 2004 | Pennant Run | Player | 125 |
| 2004 | Pennant Run | Strategy | 25 |
| 2005 | Base | Player | 348 |
| 2005 | Base | Strategy | 50 |
| 2005 | Trading Deadline | Player | 168 |
| 2005 | Trading Deadline | Strategy | 25 |

== MLB Showdown timeline ==
- February 4, 2000: MLB Showdown 2000 is announced by Wizards of the Coast.
- April 24, 2000: MLB Showdown is put on the market at $2.99 per booster pack.
- August 14, 2000: The first expansion set, entitled "Pennant Run," is released.
- March 30, 2001: MLB Showdown 2000 is named the 2000 Collectible Card Game of the Year by Card Trade Magazine.
- April 2, 2001: MLB Showdown 2001 is released; changes in the game are made to allow more baserunning choices.
- July 2001: The strategy card set is released in Pennant Run. New cards include "Mound Conference" and "Pep Talk." "1st Edition" cards are discontinued.
- April 29, 2002: MLB Showdown 2002 is released with revamped on-base values.
- July 15, 2002: MLB Showdown 2002 Trading Deadline is announced. It was released less than a week later.
- September 2002: "Super Season" cards are created, allowing managers to play with player with stats from previous historic seasons in the "Pennant Run" expansion.
- March 7, 2003: MLB Showdown 2003 is released. Icons are put onto player cards to supplement gameplay.
- June 27, 2003: New rookie season cards let managers play with a card based on a Rookie of the Year winner's rookie season.
- August 29, 2003: In the "Pennant Run" set, the Cooperstown Collection subset is created, allowing managers to play with classic Hall of Famers such as Nolan Ryan and Reggie Jackson.
- March 26, 2004: MLB Showdown 2004 is released.
- March 25, 2005: MLB Showdown 2005 is released.
- January 8, 2006: Wizards announces the cancellation of MLB Showdown.

== Reviews ==
- Pyramid

== See also ==
- NFL Showdown
- NBA Showdown
