= Star Sisterz =

Collectible card game

- Publishers: Wizards of the Coast
- Players: 2 or more
- Setup time: < 5 minutes
- Playing time: < 60 minutes

Star Sisterz, also known as Star Sisterz: Collectible Charm Game is an out-of-print collectible card game by Wizards of the Coast based on a young adult book series of the same name. It was released in March 2003 and contained 231 cards and 100 charms (a kind of jewelry). Its focus was on the tween girl market. The game and series are produced by Wizards of the Coast (a subsidiary of Hasbro) and is the company's "first card game that specifically targets girls". Wizards of the Coast has reported that the game's domestic sales have "met expectations".

== Gameplay ==
The gameplay had a truth or dare element that featured the collectible charms. The game starts with each player getting a bracelet, bracelet charms, and a deck of cards. Each player draws a card and attempts to do what it says. If you do, you get a charm to add to your bracelet.

== Reception ==
=== Game reception ===
Kidzworld gave the game a rating of four out of five stars, praising the game's bracelet charms and cards, but stating that you need multiple players to be fun and that "some of the card challenges are really lame".

=== Book reception ===
Of the book series, the School Library Journal gave the first book a mixed review, calling the ending "predictable" but stating that Nova Rocks was told with "a lot of humor and teen angst". Kidsreads.com wrote that some elements of the first book were awkward, but that the book's "fun and engaging storyline" and relevant themes that the target audience would "find hard to put down". Kidzworld gave the book three stars, saying that Nova Rocks was a "quick read" with a weak ending but was an overall "fun read".

Of later books in the series, KidzWorld wrote that Carmen Dives In was fun but that the main character was "too cool" and that didn't seem to have any real problems. Kidsreads.com has reviewed many of the other books in the series, with an overall positive consensus.
