= Legend of the Five Rings: The Card Game =

2017 collectible card game

Legend of the Five Rings
The Card Game
- Designers: Brad Andres, Erik Dahlman, and Nate French
- Publishers: Fantasy Flight Games
- Publication: 2017
- Players: 2
- Setup time: < 5 minutes
- Playing time: 45-90 minutes
- Chance: Some
- Skills: Card playing, Logic, Bluffing, Strategy

Legend of the Five Rings: The Card Game is a Living Card Game (LCG) produced by Fantasy Flight Games (FFG) from 2017 to 2021. It is a two-player game set on the world of Rokugan in the Legend of the Five Rings franchise. During the game, players take on the leadership of one of the Great Clans which define Rokugani society, and they are cast into conflict against another clan. The conflicts will decide the future of Rokugan.

The game is a successor to the Legend of the Five Rings collectible card game produced by Alderac Entertainment Group from 1995 to 2015. On 17 February 2021, FFG announced the completion of the game, Under Fu Leng’s Shadow being the last pack, released in June 2021.

== Released card sets ==
=== Core Set ===
The Core Set was shown to the public during Gen Con Indy in August 2017, and was released October 5, 2017. In order to obtain a full playset for deck building, three copies of the Core Set must be purchased.

==== Box contents ====
- 7 Stronghold Cards
- 117 Dynasty Cards
- 98 Conflict Cards
- 17 Province Cards
- 20 Status Tokens (double-sided)
- 40 Fate Tokens
- 50 Honor Tokens
- 5 Ring Tokens (double-sided)
- 1 First Player Token
- 2 Honor Dials
- 1 Imperial Favor Card (double-sided)
- 5 Role Cards (double-sided)
- 2 Reference Cards (double-sided)

=== Premium Expansions ===
The first two Premium Expansions contain 234 new cards each, covering every clan and dedicated theme. The third and last one contains 271 new cards, almost half of them being dedicated to the Shadowlands faction.

Children of the Empire Premium Expansion offered plenty of support for dueling.

Clan War Premium Expansion introduced an Enlightenment format to the game, where three or more players race to claim all five elemental rings on their provinces.

Under Fu Leng's Shadow Premium Expansion introduces two new game variants: cooperative and challenge. On cooperative variant, a player can either play solo or team up with friends to take on a mighty Shadowlands warlord. On challenge variant, one of the players will lead the forces of the Shadowlands into battle against two to four other players.

Expansion name	Release date
Children of the Empire	14 February 2019
Clan War	7 February 2020
Under Fu Leng's Shadow	18 June 2021

=== Clan Packs ===
Each Clan Pack contains 78 cards (3 copies each of 25 new cards and 1 copy each of 3 additional new cards) designed to augment deck building options for one specific clan.

Expansion Name	Clan	Release date
Disciples of the Void	Phoenix	5 April 2018
Underhand of the Emperor	Scorpion	11 October 2018
Warriors of the Wind	Unicorn	11 April 2019
Masters of the Court	Crane	25 April 2019
The Emperor's Legion	Lion	1 November 2019
Defenders of Rokugan	Crab	8 November 2019
Seekers of Wisdom	Dragon	6 December 2019

=== Dynasty Packs ===
Each Dynasty Pack typically contains 60 cards and has a complete playset of new cards (i.e. 3 copies each of 20 new cards). Dynasty packs are generally part of a six-pack "cycle" that follows a particular storyline and theme. A new pack is usually released monthly during the cycle. There was an exception with the initial Imperial cycle, where they released a new pack weekly in order to quickly increase the card pool and improve deck building variety.

==== Imperial Cycle ====
Expansion Name	Release date
Tears of Amaterasu	9 November 2017
For Honor and Glory	16 November 2017
Into the Forbidden City	23 November 2017
The Chrysanthemum Throne	30 November 2017
Fate Has No Secrets	7 December 2017
Meditations on the Ephemeral	14 December 2017

==== Elemental Cycle ====
Expansion Name	Release date
Breath of the Kami	28 June 2018
Tainted Lands	5 July 2018
The Fires Within	12 July 2018
The Ebb and Flow	19 July 2018
All and Nothing	26 July 2018
Elements Unbound	2 August 2018

==== Inheritance Cycle ====
This cycle introduced the Disguised keyword.

Expansion name	Release date
For the Empire	20 June 2019
Bonds of Blood	19 July 2019
Justice for Satsume	23 August 2019
The Children of Heaven	20 September 2019
A Champion's Foresight	25 October 2019
Shoju's Duty	29 November 2019

==== Dominion Cycle ====
This cycle introduced the Eminent and Rally keywords.

Expansion name	Release date
Rokugan at War	6 March 2020
Spreading Shadows	5 June 2020
In Pursuit of Truth	3 July 2020
Campaigns of Conquest	7 August 2020
As Honor Demands	4 September 2020
Atonement	2 October 2020

==== Temptations Cycle ====
This cycle introduced the Dire keyword.

Expansion name	Release date
Twisted Loyalties	6 November 2020
Honor in Flames	4 December 2020
A Crimson Offering	22 January 2021
The Temptation of the Scorpion	19 February 2021
Coils of Power	4 June 2021
Peace at Any Cost	21 May 2021

== Expansion Sets Ordered Chronologically ==
Expansion Name	Set	Number of cards	MSRP Price	Release date
Core Set	Core	239 (223 unique)	$39.95	5 October 2017
Tears of Amaterasu	Imperial	60 (20 unique)	$14.95	9 November 2017
For Honor and Glory	Imperial	60 (20 unique)	$14.95	16 November 2017
Into the Forbidden City	Imperial	60 (20 unique)	$14.95	23 November 2017
The Chrysanthemum Throne	Imperial	60 (20 unique)	$14.95	30 November 2017
Fate Has No Secrets	Imperial	60 (20 unique)	$14.95	7 December 2017
Meditations on the Ephemeral	Imperial	60 (20 unique)	$14.95	14 December 2017
Disciples of the Void	Clan	78 (28 unique)	$19.95	5 April 2018
Breath of the Kami	Elemental	60 (20 unique)	$14.95	28 June 2018
Tainted Lands	Elemental	60 (20 unique)	$14.95	5 July 2018
The Fires Within	Elemental	60 (20 unique)	$14.95	12 July 2018
The Ebb and Flow	Elemental	60 (20 unique)	$14.95	19 July 2018
All and Nothing	Elemental	60 (20 unique)	$14.95	26 July 2018
Elements Unbound	Elemental	60 (20 unique)	$14.95	2 August 2018
Underhand of the Emperor	Clan	78 (28 unique)	$19.95	11 October 2018
Children of the Empire	Premium	234 (82 unique)	$39.95	14 February 2019
Warriors of the Wind	Clan	78 (28 unique)	$19.95	11 April 2019
Masters of the Court	Clan	78 (28 unique)	$19.95	25 April 2019
For the Empire	Inheritance	60 (22 unique)	$14.95	20 June 2019
Bonds of Blood	Inheritance	60 (22 unique)	$14.95	19 July 2019
Justice for Satsume	Inheritance	60 (22 unique)	$14.95	23 August 2019
The Children of Heaven	Inheritance	60 (22 unique)	$14.95	20 September 2019
A Champion's Foresight	Inheritance	60 (22 unique)	$14.95	25 October 2019
The Emperor's Legion	Clan	78 (28 unique)	$19.95	1 November 2019
Defenders of Rokugan	Clan	78 (32 unique)	$19.95	8 November 2019
Shoju's Duty	Inheritance	60 (20 unique)	$14.95	29 November 2019
Seeker of Wisdom	Clan	78 (28 unique)	$19.95	6 December 2019
Clan War	Premium	231 (94 unique)	$39.95	7 February 2020
Rokugan at War	Dominion	60 (24 unique)	$14.95	6 March 2020
Spreading Shadows	Dominion	60 (24 unique)	$14.95	5 June 2020
In Pursuit of Truth	Dominion	60 (22 unique)	$14.95	3 July 2020
Campaigns of Conquest	Dominion	60 (22 unique)	$14.95	7 August 2020
As Honor Demands	Dominion	60 (22 unique)	$14.95	4 September 2020
Atonement	Dominion	60 (22 unique)	$14.95	2 October 2020
Twisted Loyalties	Temptations	60 (22 unique)	$14.95	6 November 2020
Honor in Flames	Temptations	60 (22 unique)	$14.95	4 December 2020
A Crimson Offering	Temptations	60 (22 unique)	$14.95	22 January 2021
The Temptation of the Scorpion	Temptations	60 (20 unique)	$14.95	19 February 2021
Peace at Any Cost	Temptations	60 (22 unique)	$14.95	21 May 2021
Coils of Power	Temptations	60 (22 unique)	$14.95	4 June 2021
Under Fu Leng's Shadow	Premium	271 (? unique)	$39.95	18 June 2021
