= Star Trek: The Next Generation Collectible Dice Game =

Star Trek: The Next Generation Collectible Dice Game is a 1996 tabletop game published by Five Rings Publishing Group.

== Gameplay ==
Star Trek: The Next Generation Collectible Dice Game is a game in which the Star Trek cinematic universe is fused with the mechanics of collectible dice gaming. Inspired by First Contact, the game pits players against each other in starship combat using two starter sets—Enterprise E and Borg Sphere—each equipped with a full complement of themed dice, control panels, and ship screens. Gameplay hinges on a dual-dice system: status dice, which monitor vital ship statistics like power reserves and shield strength, and system dice, which players roll to execute commands across five action types—Command, Movement, Repair, Special, and Weapons. Turns are structured around hidden planning followed by "volleys," where players reveal dice and carry out strategic maneuvers, reacting to each other in a rhythmically escalating back-and-forth until one ship's Warp Core collapses.

== Publication history ==
Shannon Appelcline noted that starting in 1996, "Over the next year Five Rings Publishing was very active in the industry. They signed an agreement with Last Unicorn Games to develop and publish Last Unicorn's Dune CCG and a license with Pinnacle Entertainment to create a Deadlands CCG called Doomtown. They also obtained the rights to publish a Star Trek collectible dice game."

== Reception ==
Andy Butcher reviewed Star Trek: The Next Generation Collectible Dice Game for Arcane magazine, rating it an 8 out of 10 overall, and stated that "A great game which features high-quality components, a very clever design, and perfectly captures both the feel and atmosphere of Star Trek space combat. Without a doubt the best-designed collectable dice system so far; if the expansion sets live up to the game's potential the ST:TNG CDG will be all but unbeatable."

== Reviews ==
- Casus Belli #103
- Backstab #2
