= Hercules: The Legendary Journeys (card game) =

Collectible card game

- Designers: Charlie Catinus, Mike Davis, Skaff Elias, Richard Garfield, Joe Grace, Jim Lin, and Joel Mick
- Publishers: Wizards of the Coast
- Players: 2 or more
- Setup time: < 5 minutes
- Playing time: < 60 minutes

Hercules: The Legendary Journeys is an out-of-print collectible card game by Wizards of the Coast based on the Hercules television series. It was first released in July 1998. The 180-card set was sold in 40-card starter decks and 12-card booster packs. It was the third and last game released using the ARC System. The game is a simplified Deckmaster system with four different card types: Resource, Character, Combat, and Action.

The ARC System allowed Hercules: The Legendary Journeys to be played with C•23 and Xena: Warrior Princess.

== World champions ==
Year	Champion
1999	Bertrand Mayer (France) - Essen (Internationale Spieltage)

== Reviews ==
- Realms of Fantasy
