= NFL Showdown =

Collectible card game

- Designers: Tom Wylie
- Publishers: Wizards of the Coast
- Years active: 2001–2003
- Players: 2
- Playing time: Approx 30 min
- Chance: Some
- Age range: 8+
- Skills: Card playing Arithmetic; Basic Reading Ability

Created in 2001, NFL Showdown is an out-of-print collectible card game by Wizards of the Coast based on American football. Cards feature players from the 2001-2003 seasons. During gameplay the game uses a barcode reader which resolves play selection. The game has been out of print since 2003.

== See also ==
- MLB Showdown
- NBA Showdown

== Reviews ==
- Pyramid
