= NBA Showdown =

Trading card game

- Publishers: Wizards of the Coast
- Years active: 2002
- Players: 2
- Playing time: Approx 20 min.
- Chance: High
- Age range: 8+
- Skills: Card playing Arithmetic; Basic reading ability

NBA Showdown is an out-of-print trading card game produced by Wizards of the Coast based on the game of basketball. It was released in February 2002. The game is played with customizable decks of cards featuring National Basketball Association players and 20-sided dice. It is one of several sport-themed card games produced through the company, including MLB Showdown and NFL Showdown.

The one and only set was released in 2002 and contained 228 player cards (175 of which were designated common, the other 53 rare) and 50 strategy cards. Both starter sets and seven-card booster packs were sold. Approximately one in every three booster packs contains a rare card. The NBA Showdown 2002 starter set contains the following items:

- 16 player cards -including John Stockton and Dikembe Mutombo rare cards
- 40 strategy cards
- 1 20-sided die
- 1 playmat
- 1 rulebook
- 1 set of counters and tokens

Shortly after the game was released, several coaches in the Indiana Pacers organization participated in the "Front Office Basketball League", a simulated NBA season using the cards.

The game was discontinued after its initial run, though it maintained a small following online via sites such as showdowncards.com.
