= Legend of the Burning Sands =

Collectible card game

- Legend of the Burning Sands card back
- Designers: David Williams and Raymond Lau
- Publishers: Five Rings Publishing Group
- Players: 2-6
- Playing time: Approx 1 hour
- Chance: Some
- Skills: Card playing Arithmetic; Basic Reading Ability

Legend of the Burning Sands (LBS) is an out-of-print collectible card game (CCG) published by Five Rings Publishing Group (FRPG, then a subsidiary of Wizards of the Coast) in July 1998. It was a spin-off from the earlier CCG Legend of the Five Rings. Legend of the Burning Sands was set in the same fictional world as Legend of the Five Rings, but with an Arabian setting rather than an East Asian one, with a few characters appearing in both games. Both games had similar mechanics and emphasized a continuing storyline.

The first three Legend of the Burning Sands sets were released under FRPG's experimental Rolling Thunder system, which emphasized small, regular releases of cards. The Rolling Thunder distribution mechanism proved to be unpopular, however, so the game was put on hiatus. After six months, the game's massive conclusion set, The Awakening, was released, but interest in the game had already faded significantly. Sales were poor, and most of the stock was destroyed rather than being warehoused. Today, cards from The Awakening are in high demand from collectors.

Much like Legend of the Five Rings, LBS included many factions, especially towards the end of the game, where 12 different groups existed: The Ashalan, Ivory Kingdoms, Assassins, Ra'Shari, Senpet, Yodatai, Celestial Alliance, Jackals, Ebonites, Moto, Dahab and Qabal.

== Expansion sets ==
1. Shadow of the Tyrant: Released July 1998. 156 cards.
2. Secrets and Lies: Released October 1998. 104 cards.
3. Black Hand, Black Heart: Released December 1998. 104 cards.
4. The Awakening: Released June 1999. Approximately 315 cards.

== Revival ==
In 2006, a movement was started to revive LBS at Origins and GenCon. A project was later started to photo document all known cards in the hopes of building standard rules for proxying cards to be able to play.

A plugin for the free LackeyCCG engine was also created. It includes all the cards picture, text and rulings, allowing players to enjoy online games of Legends of the Burning Sands without any constraints regarding cards disponibility nor geographical emplacement.

In 2012, the game system was revised and implemented in the game "Romance of the Nine Empires" which was inspired by the movie "The Gamers: Hands of Fate." During the movie's Kickstarter campaign, Alderac Entertainment Group promised the game's release as a stretch goal option.

== Fan remaster ==
On June 18, 2021, the completion of a fan project to remaster Legend of the Burning Sands was announced on BoardGameGeek by the original project lead from the 2006 revival. The Remaster features new card templates, updated rulebook, and reworked card texts.

== Role-playing game ==
Alderac Entertainment Group has announced the release of a Legend of the Burning Sands sourcebook for their 3rd Edition Legend of the Five Rings Role-Playing Game. The book, a stand-alone game compatible with L5R, was released in September, 2008. A Fourth edition update was released as a free PDF in 2010.

== Reviews ==
- InQuest Gamer #43
