= The Primal Order =

Fantasy role-playing game supplement

- First edition cover
- Designers: Peter Adkison
- Publishers: Wizards of the Coast
- Publication: 1992, 1995 (revised edition)
- Genres: Fantasy
- Systems: Capsystem

The Primal Order, or TPO, is a religion-based fantasy roleplaying game supplement. Of particular note, TPO was the first work published by Wizards of the Coast and its president, Peter Adkison. Through TPO, Wizards of the Coast introduced the "Capsystem" concept, enabling gamemasters to seamlessly integrate TPO and future Capsystem titles into other role-playing games.

The supplement covers high-powered gaming and the gods. TPO provides guidelines for gamemasters to develop individual gods of various power levels, to include entire pantheons, as well as the vast support network, both divine and mortal, required to maintain and increase godly status. These guidelines stem from the foundational concept of primal energy, its sources and impact, as well as its resource management.

As part of the sale of Wizards of the Coast to Hasbro in 2001, Adkison retained the rights to The Primal Order, his own original work.

== Published supplements ==
Wizards quickly followed up the release of TPO with several supplements to help build on the system's foundation. These supplements included:

- Pawns, The Opening Move. Written by Nigel Findley, the first supplement serves as a bestiary created with the TPO ruleset in mind. It was published in 1992.
- Knights, Strategies in Motion. Written by Nigel Findley, this supplement details three fictional deities and their approaches to building their respective religions based on the TPO ruleset. It was published in 1993.
- Chessboards, The Planes of Possibility. Written by Dave Howell, this supplement details planar design and management with respect to the TPO ruleset. It was published in 1993. The first copies went on sale at Gen Con 1993, but its release was overshadowed by another new product: Magic: the Gathering.

== Controversy ==
One of the driving forces behind the Capsystem concept was to provide gamemasters of various systems with conversion notes to port TPO into their respective games. Wizards therefore solicited conversions for various systems, and included the following conversions with TPO:

- Advanced Dungeons & Dragons (both 1st and 2nd edition)
- Arduin Grimoire
- Ars Magica
- Chivalry & Sorcery
- Dungeons & Dragons
- GURPS
- HârnMaster
- Hero System
- Palladium Fantasy Role-Playing Game
- Pendragon RPG
- RoleMaster
- RuneQuest
- Shadowrun
- Synnibarr
- Talislanta
- Torg
- Warhammer Fantasy Roleplay
- WarpWorld

Kevin Siembieda, the owner of Palladium Books and Palladium FRPG copyright holder, sued Wizards for copyright infringement. The parties settled the suit out of court, and Wizards released a revised edition of TPO that excluded Palladium. The revised edition also excluded AD&D, D&D and WarpWorld. However, Adkison took advantage of the revision to include these games:

- Castle Falkenstein
- CORPS
- Earthdawn
- Kult
- Tri Tac Games
- World of Darkness games

The expanded coverage increased TPO 's page count from 232 to 250 pages. It also included new cover art.

== Planned supplements ==
Wizards initially planned several supplements, of which two are known:

- Bishops, The Eternal Crusade. This TPO supplement, to be written by Loren Miller, was to focus on "Earthly" churches using the TPO ruleset. It was never completed, nor are there any notes or references available.
- Rivals of Estedil. Written by Jonathan Tweet, this was an adventure using the TPO ruleset. It was never completed, although Mr. Tweet compiled copious notes and an outline.

In addition, the following Capsystem works are mentioned in the Legal Stuff section of both the original and revised editions:

- The Military Order
- The Economic Order
- The Governmental Order
- The Underworld Order

Yet, with the dramatic success of Magic: The Gathering, coupled with previous legal issues regarding their Capsystem approach, Wizards focused almost entirely on collectible card games and did not release any further Capsystem books.

== Other conversions ==
Although TPO received no further official support beyond the 1995 revised edition, several folks have put forth other game system conversions for the system, to include:

- GURPS 4th Edition
- Mythus
- Unisystem

== Reception ==
Gene Alloway reviewed The Primal Order in White Wolf #34 (Jan./Feb., 1993), rating it a 5 out of 5 and stated that "Overall, it is just an exceptional work. I suggest with great emphasis that any GM who is running a campaign, however small, pick this book up. It will change your 'world' in a dramatic and exciting way."

Loyd Blankenship reviewed The Primal Order in Pyramid #1 (May/June, 1993), and stated that "TPO is probably the single most useful book a GM can buy regarding the proper and effective use of gods and religion in a campaign."

TPO received very good reviews from various sources, including RPGNet.

== Reviews ==
- Journeys: Journal of Multidimensional Roleplaying #6
