= Legend of the Five Rings =

Collectible card game and setting

- Designers: John Zinser, Dave Seay, Dave Williams, Jeff Alexander, Brent Keith, Bryan Reese, and John Wick
- Publishers: Alderac Entertainment Group (1995–2015)
- Publication: 1995–present
- Genres: Asian Fantasy CCG / RPG
- Players: 2 or more
- Chance: Some (order of cards drawn)

Legend of the Five Rings (often abbreviated L5R) is a fictional setting created by John Zinser, Dave Seay, Ryan Dancey, Dave Williams, DJ Trindle, Matt Wilson and John Wick and first published by a joint venture between Alderac Entertainment Group and ISOMEDIA in 1995. The setting primarily involves the fictional empire of Rokugan, though some additional areas and cultures have been discussed. Rokugan is based roughly on feudal Japan with influences from other East Asian cultures such as China, Mongolia and Korea. This setting is the basis for the Legend of the Five Rings Collectible Card Game as well as the Legend of the Five Rings Roleplaying Game. Legend of the Five Rings was also the "featured campaign setting" of the Oriental Adventures expansion to the third edition of Dungeons & Dragons, though this book is now out of print.

The timeline of the Legends of the Five Rings setting can be influenced by players of the collectible card game, and to a lesser extent the role-playing game, with the winners of major tournaments making pivotal decisions that become canonical history in future products. The most significant example of this was the Race for the Throne event, which took place through 2007 and 2008, which allowed players of both the collectible card game and the role-playing game to affect the storyline of their Clan by earning points in various Spheres of influence.

L5R was acquired by Fantasy Flight Games in 2015. In 2020, FFG's parent company Asmodee transferred L5R to another subsidiary, Edge Studio.

== Products ==
=== Card games ===
==== Collectible card game ====
The Legend of the Five Rings collectible card game is played by two or more players (in tournaments, generally two), each with two decks of at least 40 cards each (formerly at least 30 cards each). The game continues until a player has reached one of several different victory conditions, at which point that player is declared the winner. Victory conditions include winning militarily (destroying all provinces of one's opponent), by honour (reaching a certain number of honour points), dishonour (forcing one's opponent under a certain honour point threshold), through enlightenment (by putting cards called rings into play) or via a couple of special cards which essentially mean "game won".

In the game's tournaments players can affect the storyline of the game, their deck construction directly contributing to the lives (or deaths) of the characters involved. This is in turn reflected in future expansions of the game, and the mechanics of the cards therein. The full current rules of the collectible card game can be found at the Comprehensive Rules Site. The Kotei Season runs generally February through June of each year, where regional tournaments occur around the world. Each season incorporates a major event currently going on in the Emerald Empire, with each event determining at least one factor of the larger story. Kotei winners are pre-qualified into major events such as Gen Con and the European Championships, allowing them to skip the qualifying rounds.

Legend of the Five Rings has many cards that are directly influenced by players and their actions. These cards often feature an attribution on the vertical right side of the card, which includes the name of the player, the event, and the date involved in the creation of the card or theme behind the card. Having your name on a card is a goal of many players of Legend of the Five Rings.

The CCG ended its run in 2015.

==== Oracle of the Void ====
Having no official search engine for the game, Bryan Reese created the Oracle of the Void, released by Alderac in 2012. The Oracle is a search engine which contains the text, visuals, flavor text, and more for every printing of every card in the game's history. Bryan created every card entry and every card image in the Oracle. Bryan brought onto the project Don Eisele to code, Brook Cunningham to update the wordings for all cards to modern templating, and Brandon Snyder to collect all flavor text for every version of every card. In 2015, Ryan Dancey briefly shut down the Oracle of the Void after L5R's sale to Fantasy Flight Games, but Bryan revived the Oracle and gave control of it to Don Eisele who kept it active.

The Oracle of the Void is widely regarded as the greatest online resource for the card game.

==== Living card game ====
After Legend of the Five Rings was purchased by Fantasy Flight Games, in 2015, they released a new version of the card game. Fantasy Flight's version (renamed Legend of the Five Rings: The Card Game) is distributed as an introductory core set with periodical Clan Packs (which focus on a single clan) and Dynasty Packs (which have a variety of clan cards). Unlike the collectible card game version, the cards in the core set and packs are non-random.

The game is played by two players, each with two decks of 40–45 cards each. The game continues until a player has reached one of several different victory conditions, at which point that player is declared the winner. Victory conditions include breaking the province which holds their opponent's stronghold, accumulating 25 honor, or having their opponent run out of honor. In the game's tournaments players can affect the storyline of the game.

The living card game was discontinued in 2021.

=== Role-playing game ===
The Legend of the Five Rings Role-Playing Game is a role-playing game that requires one person to be game master and any number of other people to play different characters. There is no "winner" or "loser", and the players do not generally compete against each other. Instead, the players work together to find a solution to some problem which the game master has presented their characters. The setting allows for stories which are oriented around action, courtly diplomacy or a mix of the two.

The Legend of the Five Rings Role-Playing Game is currently in its fifth edition. The first four editions used an original ruleset designed specifically for the setting. To distinguish this game system from the d20 System mechanics (see below), it is often referred to as the d10, "classic", or the "Roll & Keep" ("R&K") system.

In September 2017, after Legend of the Five Rings was purchased by Fantasy Flight, they announced a fifth edition of the RPG, which was released on October 11, 2018. It features an alternate version of the Roll and Keep system using special dice.

In 2020, FFG's parent company Asmodee transferred FFG's RPG lines, including Legend of the Five Rings, to Edge Studio, another subsidiary of Asmodee.

In August 2022, Edge Studio released Adventures in Rokugan, a roleplaying game set in Rokugan but utilizing a system compatible with the 5th Edition of Dungeons & Dragons.

=== Live-action roleplaying ===
In 2004 a live-action roleplay version of the game was released. Live-Action roleplaying has long been a major part of Legend of the Five Rings at events such as Gen Con. Heroes of Rokugan, a fan-run group, organizes yearly LARPs as part of their own storyline.

=== Board games ===
Clan War was a miniature based model strategy game produced by AEG, whose story line is derived from the Legend of the Five Rings setting. This game is currently out of print; in 2010, however, a limited selection of the metal miniatures used to play the game was released by Valiant Enterprises Ltd. A second Legend of the Five Rings board game titled Art of War has been demonstrated several times but never released.

In 2011 AEG released a board game titled War of Honor, which utilized the same cards as the collectible card game in a simplified game. Four complete decks were included with the game, making it self-contained, however additional cards can also be included. A second game, titled Ninja: Legend of the Scorpion Clan, was released the same year. This is a board game for 2–4 players in which one player takes the role of a Scorpion Clan ninja attempting to infiltrate a Lion Clan compound, with the other players defending it.

In 2013 a Legend of the Five Rings themed version of the card game Love Letter was released. Using a deck of 16 cards and taking roughly an hour to play, the game simulates the courtly intrigue surrounding the attempts of several players to court a princess.

In 2017, Fantasy Flight Games released Battle for Rokugan, an L5R-themed area-control strategy board game in which the clans fight to conquer regions on a map of Rokugan.

In 2024, Office Dog Games released River of Gold, an economic board game in which the players take the role of river merchants aligned with one of six clans from Rokugan, developing ports, trading resources, and accumulating local influence.

In 2025, Monolith Board Games announced Champions of Rokugan.

=== Video game ===
In 2023, Swedish game development studio Palindrome Interactive announced that they had partnered with publisher Asmodee to bring the franchise to the video game genre for the first time, with the game Shadowveil: Legend of the Five Rings.

== Novels ==
=== Clan War series ===
- The Scorpion by Stephen D. Sullivan (July 2000)
- The Unicorn by Allison Lassieur (September 2000)
- The Crane by Ree Soesbee (November 2000)
- The Phoenix by Stephen D. Sullivan (March 2001)
- The Crab by Stan Brown (June 2001)
- The Dragon by Ree Soesbee (September 2001)
- The Lion by Stephen D. Sullivan (November 2001)

=== The Four Winds Saga ===
- The Steel Throne by Edward Bolme (March 2002)
- Wind of Honor by Ree Soesbee (August 2002)
- Wind of War by Jess Lebow, Ree Soesbee (December 2002)
- Wind of Justice by Rich Wulf (June 2003)
- Wind of Truth by Ree Soesbee (December 2003)

=== Death at Koten ===
In May 2009, Death at Koten was published, a graphic novel written by Shawn Carman which takes place in the Legend of the Five Rings setting. It revolves around the death of Hida Kisada and the events that take place as a result of his assassination.

=== Aconyte Books ===
- Curse of Honor by David Annadale (October 2020)
- Poison River The Daidoji Shin Mysteries by Josh Reynolds (December 2020)
- The Night Parade of 100 Demons by Marie Brennan (February 2021)
- Death's Kiss The Daidoji Shin Mysteries by Josh Reynolds (June 2021)
- The Great Clans of Rokugan - Volume 1 by Various (November 2021)
  - Ice and Snow by Katrina Ostrander
  - The Sword and the Spirits by Robert Denton III
  - Whispers of Shadow and Steel by Mari Murdock
  - Across the Burning Sands by Daniel Lovat Clark
- To Chart the Clouds by Evan Dicken (January 2022)
- The Great Clans of Rokugan - Volume 2 by Various (May 2022)
  - Deathseeker by Robert Denton III
  - Trail of Shadows by D.G. Laderoute
  - The Eternal Knot by Marie Brennan
- The Flower Path The Daidoji Shin Mysteries by Josh Reynolds (June 2022)
- The Game of 100 Candles by Marie Brennan (March 2023)
- Three Oaths The Daidoji Shin Mysteries by Josh Reynolds (July 2023)
- The Soul of Iuchiban by Evan Dicken (September 2023)
- The Market of 100 Fortunes by Marie Brennan (February 2024)
- A Bitter Taste The Daidoji Shin Mysteries by Josh Reynolds (August 2024)
- A Throne Betrayed by Julie Kagawa and J.T. Nicholas (August 2025)

== Setting ==
Legend of the Five Rings is set primarily in the fictional land of Rokugan (also known as the Emerald Empire), based on feudal Japan with influences from other East Asian cultures, where samurai, shugenja, and trained courtiers vie for control of the noble courts. Rokugan itself is home to mostly humans, divided into a society based on clans, with eight Great Clans and various minor ones, though at the moment they are all in confusion, and are vying for one of their members to be the new Emperor. They are regularly threatened by evil plots from within, but the main threat still lies to the southwest of Rokugan: the deadly wastes of the Shadowlands, where demonic hordes roam.

The world of L5R, which contains Rokugan, also contains the nations of the Burning Sands as well as the Ivory Kingdoms. A few foreign visitors from these lands have been featured in Legend of the Five Rings, but have not played a major role in the storyline. Much is unknown of these lands, mostly due to the extreme xenophobia of the Rokugani, shown in the story by an Imperial mandate of non-interaction with gaijin.

== History ==
=== Ownership ===
Alderac Entertainment Group (AEG), in partnership with Isomedia, first designed and published the L5R collectible card game in 1995. Eventually, it became obvious that L5R would greatly benefit from the sort of promotion, marketing, and production that costs a lot of money. Some of the original AEG and Isomedia folks found interested investors and formed the Five Rings Publishing Group (FRPG), which purchased the intellectual property (IP) that is L5R. FRPG took over production and marketing, while AEG continued to design the game. In 1997, AEG licensed the role-playing publication rights for L5R from FRPG, and published the first edition of the L5R RPG. The fans liked it enough to vote it the Best RPG of 1997 at the Origins Awards, and the core book went through four printings while spawning two dozen sourcebooks and add-on products.

— D. J. Trindle

In 1997, FRPG was purchased by Wizards of the Coast. The existing licenses remained in place, so the same creative team continued work on Legend of the Five Rings, AEG continued publishing the RPG, and Wizards began publishing the card game. In 1999, Legend of the Five Rings changed hands once more when Wizards was purchased by toy-making giant Hasbro (however, "Wizards" continued operations under their original name). The previous licenses were still in effect, so changes to the games and the development teams as a result were unnoticeable. Wizards of the Coast re-released Oriental Adventures (a long out-of-print AD&D supplement), changing the setting from the original Kara-Tur to Rokugan, and updating the supplement to the d20 rules. Several of the following sourcebooks provided dual (d20 & d10/R&K) rulesets.

In late 2000, however, speculation about the future of Legend of the Five Rings – especially the RPG – began to run rampant after Hasbro, during a string of decisions that greatly upset the leadership at Wizards, decided to sell Legend of the Five Rings two years before AEG's long-standing license was due to expire. Any fears turned out to be unfounded when, less than half a year later, AEG won the bidding war for Legend of the Five Rings.

Until 2015, AEG owned Legend of the Five Rings. They designed and published the card game and the role-playing game. AEG released Lotus Edition for the CCG in late 2005, beginning the Age of Enlightenment story arc. Samurai Edition was released in July 2007 and included the Race for the Throne story arc. Celestial Edition was released in mid-2009, followed by Emperor Edition in early 2012 and Ivory Edition two years after that, in 2014. The final arc designed by AEG, Onyx Edition, was to be released in 2016.

On September 11, 2015, AEG and Fantasy Flight Games jointly announced that the setting had been sold to FFG. A new version of the card game (incompatible with the CCG) was released as a Living Card Game at Gen Con 2017.

=== Design Team ===
There have been four 'eras' when it comes to the L5R Design Lead/Team.

When the game first released until its sale from Wizards of the Coast back to Alderac in 2001, David Williams was the Lead Designer. Starting in 2001, Jeff Alexander took over as Lead Designer until 2004 when Brent Keith became the Lead Designer. The Player Design Team (known as the PDT) was created in 2004 and remained until the game's sale in 2015. The PDT were a small group of volunteer players (usually 5) who helped design and develop the game. Mark Wootton became the game's first and only Lead Developer in 2005, retiring the role in 2010. Bryan Reese was the game's final Lead Designer, taking over from Brent Keith in 2006. Bryan oversaw the most tumultuous time in the game's history after the Lotus Edition almost killed the game in 2005-2006, through the crash of 2008, until its sale to Fantasy Flight Games in 2015. Bryan was the game's longest Lead Designer, and also subsumed the roles of Lead Developer, Lead Playtester, and Project Manager.

=== Story Team ===
There have been five 'eras' when it comes to the L5R Story Lead/Team.

The previous lead was Rich Wulf, assisted by Shawn Carman. Wulf's works include Way of the Wolf, Bells of the Dead, Rokugan, and many other Legend of the Five Rings products. Large contributions to the Legend of the Five Rings series were also made by Ree Soesbee, who was lead writer of Legend of the Five Rings prior to Rich Wulf, and John Wick before her who along with the founding members of Five Rings Publishing Group created the world. While the property was controlled by Wizards of the Coast, the creation of the Four Winds arc (starting with Gold Edition) was helmed by Paul Allen Timm and Rob Heinsoo with contributions from Andy Heckt and Frank Chafe.

Currently, Shawn Carman is the head of the Legend of the Five Rings Story Team. He has had great success at incorporating player effects into the game in a smooth manner, regardless of how odd the results of a tournament may be to the setting of the game. His team includes Nancy Sauer, Brian Yoon, Yoon Ha Lee, and Robert Denton with Fred Wan acting as co-lead and continuity editor. The team formerly included Rusty Priske and Lucas Twyman.

=== International Olympic Committee legal issues ===
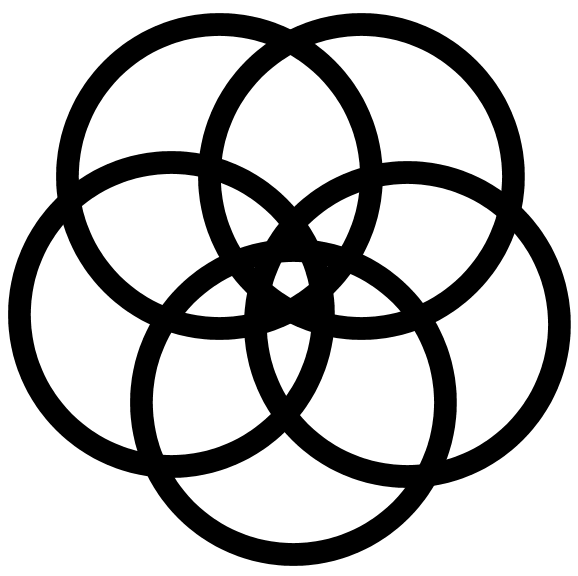
Five rings in an arrangement resembling those on the original Lot5R cards

One legal issue for Legend of the Five Rings involved the use of a symbol that consisted of five interlocking rings, arranged in essentially a star pattern. This symbol was used for several years in the role-playing game and featured prominently on the backings of the cards in the collectible card game. The United States Olympic Committee sued Wizards of the Coast, who at that time owned Legend of the Five Rings, over the logo, because a special Act of the U.S. Congress gave them the exclusive rights to any symbol consisting of five interlocking rings.

The only way to completely resolve the issue was to quit using the symbol. For the role-playing game this meant very little, but for the collectible card game it meant that the backing of the cards had to be redesigned, which left players with a mix of cards that essentially resulted in marked decks. In an attempt to appease the players, Wizards released the first set with the different backs – Spirit Wars – bundled with opaque sleeves that would obscure the designs on the backs of the cards, allowing players to use any mix of cards in their decks.

== See also ==
- The Book of Five Rings
- Legend of the Burning Sands
