= Five Rings Publishing Group =

Card game publisher

The Five Rings Publishing Group (FRPG) was formed as a spin-out of Alderac Entertainment Group and ISOMEDIA.

== History ==
In 1996, Alderac Entertainment Group (AEG) and ISOMEDIA divested themselves of their joint operating venture, and created Five Rings Publishing Group. Using the joint venture the two companies had co-created the Legend of the Five Rings Collectible Card Game in 1995, and realized that in order to continue to successfully publish the game that a stand-alone company focused on the game-publishing business was the best solution.

FRPG was incorporated in the spring of 1996, and was funded by a pool of investors recruited in the Seattle area by Robert (Bob) Abramowitz, who became the CEO of the new company. John Zinser, CEO of AEG took the additional role of VP of Sales, and Ryan S. Dancey of ISOMEDIA left the company to become the full-time VP of Product Development for FRPG. Other initial staff at FRPG included Mindy Sherwood-Lewis, Philip Lewis, Arnold Koppel, Heather Beiderman, Al Skaar, Blake Beasley and Daniel Landers.

FRPG signed a development deal with AEG to allow the AEG team to continue to work on Legend of the Five Rings, and licensed the L5R property to AEG for its role-playing game line.

It also began development work on the Legend of the Burning Sands, a "sequel" of sorts to the Legend of the Five Rings world, set in a mythical "dark arabia" setting featuring pseudo-Egyptians, pseudo-Mongols, and a melange of 1001 Arabian Nights and The Adventures of Sinbad. This work was also contracted to AEG.

FRPG partnered with Last Unicorn Games to develop and publish the Dune Collectible Card Game. Last Unicorn negotiated the license with the Herbert Estate and oversaw the design and art direction of the game.

The company also entered into a complex three-way deal with AEG and Pinnacle Entertainment Group to create Doomtown: The Deadlands Collectible Card Game. AEG would do the design and art direction based on Pinnacle Entertainment Group's intellectual property, Deadlands.

In addition to its work on collectible card games, the company also entered into a licensing deal with Paramount Pictures for the Star Trek license, and began work on the Star Trek: The Next Generation Collectible Dice Game.

Finally, as a part of the deal that created FRPG, ISOMEDIA transferred its ownership of RPG International, its mail order hobby gaming business to FRPG. RPG International sold all manner of hobby gaming products (such as RPGs, collectible card games, wargames, etc.) to customers all around the globe.

FRPG had a short, but exciting life. In the spring of 1997, FRPG helped to broker the deal that allowed Wizards of the Coast to acquire TSR, Inc., the creator of Dungeons & Dragons. As a part of that deal, Wizards of the Coast also acquired FRPG, which was rolled into Wizards' New Brand Development & Licensing (NBD&L) group, under the auspices of Vice President Richard Fukutaki. FRPG continued to exist as an organization within Wizards of the Coast through the end of 1998, when it was finally dissolved. During this period, it saw the launch of Legend of the Burning Sands, Doomtown, Dune, the Star Trek Collectible Dice Game, and it completed several more projects that were in transition during its acquisition, including re-launching the Rage Collectible Card Game under license from White Wolf, Inc. and redesigned and art-directed by Luke Peterschmidt, as well as overseeing the Commander's Edition of the BattleTech Collectible Card Game licensed from FASA Corporation and developed and art directed by Wizards of the Coast.

By the end of 1998, Ryan had been reassigned to head up the company's role-playing game business, Luke Peterschmidt was brought on staff full-time and took over management of many of the games FRPG had produced, and most of the rest of the team had moved on to other opportunities both within and outside of Wizards of the Coast.
