= Legend of the Five Rings (collectible card game) =

1995 collectible card game

- Designers: David Seay, John Zinser, David Williams, Jeff Alexander, Brent Keith, and Bryan Reese
- Publishers: Alderac Entertainment Group
- Players: 2-8
- Playing time: 1 hour
- Chance: Some
- Age range: 14+
- Skills: Card playing Arithmetic/Patience/Grasp of strategy Basic reading ability

Legend of the Five Rings (L5R) is an out-of-print collectible card game created by a joint venture featuring Alderac Entertainment Group and ISOMEDIA in 1995 and published until 2015, when it was announced that the game would be discontinued for a rules-incompatible successor that will be part of Fantasy Flight Games' Living Card Game line. L5R takes place in the fictional empire of Rokugan from the Legend of the Five Rings setting, where several clans and factions vie for domination over the empire.

The card game shares some similarities with Magic: The Gathering but has its own game mechanics and flavor, providing "passive" win conditions like the Enlightenment Victory, as well as a version of Magic's goal of destroying the opponent. Games can be very long, with some matches lasting hours.

A major distinctive feature of the game is the importance of the storyline: new fiction pieces advancing the story of Rokugan are published on a weekly basis, in addition to being released with every expansion, and in a quarterly publication, the Imperial Herald. Many of these stories reflect the result of tournaments, where players use their decks to determine which faction will claim a particular prize within the storyline. Two novel lines, covering the Clan War and Four Winds arcs, have been published.

Legend of the Five Rings has garnered many accolades throughout the years, including several Origins awards (such as the most recent 2008 award for best CCG with Samurai Edition) and the 2008 Scrye Players Choice Best CCG Award for Samurai Edition.

== History ==
The game was created by a joint venture featuring Alderac Entertainment Group and ISOMEDIA. It was first previewed at Gen Con in 1995, followed by the release of the first set, Imperial Edition, in October of that year, beginning the Clan War arc. The joint venture was dissolved and spun-out as Five Rings Publishing Group (FRPG), which was then acquired by Wizards of the Coast in 1997.

In 2000, at the behest of Wizards' mother company, Hasbro, the intellectual property to the game was put up for sale. Alderac Entertainment acquired the rights to publish the game in 2001, and full rights over the game within the following years, and have since published the game.

The release of Lotus Edition (in 2005) and Samurai Edition (2007) saw extensive changes to several aspects of the game.

=== Card appearance changes ===
Originally, cards featured intricately ornate front sides, while the back of the card, either black or green, featured five interlocked rings and the words "Legend of the Five Rings".

Starting with the release of Pearl Edition in 1999, the card fronts were changed to a simpler, cleaner look that allowed for more card text, as well as returning the visual focus of the card on the art, rather than the borders of the card.

Following a legal issue with the International Olympic Committee, which has trademark-like rights in the United States to all designs featuring five interlocking rings, it was agreed that Wizards of the Coast would change the card back. This was done with The Spirit Wars in 2000, when the design was changed to five non-interlocking circular symbols depicting each of the five elements of the game (Fire, Air, Earth, Water and Void).

The card fronts were redesigned for a second time in 2008.

== Factions ==
There are a number of different factions that a player may use in Legend of the Five Rings. Each faction has different strengths and weaknesses and often can use one or more different paths to victory. At various times in the game's history, factions have been added and removed for storyline reasons, simplification of mechanics for newer players or power-level reasons. At the time of Imperial Edition six factions were included: Crab, Crane, Dragon, Lion, Phoenix and Unicorn. The most recent arc, Emperor Edition, features the six original factions and three others: Mantis, Scorpion, and Spider.

=== Imperial Edition factions ===
- Crab Clan: Defenders of Rokugan from the creatures of the Shadowlands, the Crab Clan are traditionally a military clan.
- Crane Clan: Artisans, courtiers and duelists, the Crane Clan usually tries to achieve victory by gaining recognition for its honorable deeds.
- Dragon Clan: Isolated and mysterious monks and deadly duelists, the Dragon Clan often speak in riddles and act in unpredictable ways. The Dragon has been a clan that can win through any victory condition, and has usually been one of the best clans to be able to achieve an enlightenment victory.
- Lion Clan: Firm adherents to Bushido, and deadly warriors, the Lion Clan tends to win through military victory, but is often able to win by being more honorable, gaining its honor from battle instead of words.
- Phoenix Clan: Honorable shugenja (wizards or spellcasters) and their dutiful yojimbo (bodyguards) allow the Phoenix clan to win through honor. Despite being pacifistic in nature, the Phoenix Clan has often had a strong military theme, utilizing tricks and spells to prevail against stronger individual forces.
- Unicorn Clan: Masters of horsemanship, the Unicorn Clan is primarily a military clan that uses cavalry to attack around the enemy defenders, allowing them to attack resources as well as being strong in direct confrontations. The Unicorn are seen by many to be outsiders but are capable of honor victory.

=== Introduced during the Clan War arc ===
- Naga (Shadowlands): A race of ancient snake people, the Naga were unable to win through honor victory, but had a strong military theme.
- Scorpion Clan (Shadowlands): A dark mirror to the Crane Clan, the Scorpion also use the power of the courts, but where the Crane seek to be more virtuous than their adversaries, the Scorpion seek to shame theirs. The Scorpion also have military strength, but their ninja and warriors are more subtle than the Lion or Crab, using the power of their courtiers to slow the enemy down.
- Toturi's Army (Anvil of Despair): A group of ronin (unaligned samurai) united under the banner of Toturi the Black, the former Lion Clan champion who was shamed and forced to leave his clan. Toturi's army was both a military and honor faction that eventually morphed into the Monkey Clan, a minor clan of Rokugan.
- Yogo Junzo's Army/The Shadowlands Horde (Anvil of Despair): Monstrous oni, goblins, trolls, and corrupted samurai from the evil Shadowlands who follow the dark kami, Fu Leng, and seek the destruction of Rokugan. The Shadowlands Horde has in part merged into the Spider Clan, a great clan of Rokugan.
- Yoritomo's Alliance (Crimson and Jade): An alliance of several minor clans. At the conclusion of the Clan War, Yoritomo was allowed to make his alliance into a great clan, the Mantis Clan. The original four clans in the alliance were the Mantis Clan, the Wasp Clan, the Fox Clan and the Centipede Clan, as well as other members from the great clans and minor clans.
- The Brotherhood of Shinsei (Crimson and Jade): Identified by the monk keyword, the Brotherhood of Shinsei were pacifists who primarily dealt with enlightenment and honor victories, but were able to use their powerful magic to defend the empire as well.

=== Introduced during the Hidden Emperor arc ===
- The Ninja/Lying Darkness (Dark Journey Home): Identified by the ninja keyword, they served as the ultimate evil bent on destroying everything that existed. They were defeated at the end of the Jade Arc, but many ninja have survived and are now a part of the Spider Clan.
- Ratlings (Heroes of Rokugan): A race of anthropomorphic rat people who received a stronghold that was allowed in both Jade and Gold Editions.
- Spirits (The Spirit Wars): Received one stronghold in the last expansion of Jade Edition.

=== Introduced during later arcs ===
- Spider Clan: Founded by Daigotsu, the dark lord of the Shadowlands, the Spider clan has now been elevated to great clan status.
- Imperial (Emperor Edition): Had a stronghold representing the forces of the Imperial Household during the raid on the Second City.
- Fudo (Coils of Madness): A rogue faction of the Shinsei who followed the teachings of a new master.
- Pan'Ku (Coils of Madness): The forces that followed the whims of the mad Dragon Pan'Ku.

=== Other factions ===
In addition to the playable factions, several minor clans exist in Rokugan, each with a purpose and task given to them by the Emperor and some card and storyline support. They include the Badger Clan, Bat Clan, Boar Clan, Dragonfly Clan, Falcon Clan (now the Toritaka family of the Crab), Fox Clan (now the Kitsune Family of the Mantis Clan), Hare Clan, Kolat, Monkey Clan, Oriole Clan, Snake Clan (now the Chuda Family of the Spider clan), Sparrow Clan, Tortoise Clan, and Wasp Clan (now the Tsuruchi Family of the Mantis Clan).

== Game play ==
Legend of the Five Rings can be played with any number of players, although two to four are most common. Unlike most CCGs, which are geared towards one-on-one duels, L5R was designed with multi-player matches in mind. Each player represents a leader of one of the factions battling for power.

=== Before the game ===
Each player has two decks that are kept separate during play: One Dynasty deck, consisting of black-backed cards, and one Fate deck, consisting of green-backed cards. Each deck must contain at least 40 cards, with no upper limit. No deck may contain more than three of any particular card, and no more than one of any particular unique card. In addition to a Fate deck and a Dynasty deck, each player must choose one Stronghold card to represent his or her faction and ancestral home.

At the beginning of a game, all players start by simultaneously revealing their chosen stronghold. The family honor value printed on the stronghold determines play order, with the highest value going first. If a tie occurs, a random method such as a die roll or coin toss is used. Each player shuffles his or her Fate and Dynasty decks, and places them some distance apart on the game surface. Players then place the first four cards of their Dynasty deck face down on the table in front of them next to each other, between their two decks. This represents their provinces, the lands their clan control. Finally, each player draws five Fate cards and places them in his or her hand.

The two most important type of card in the game are the personality and the holding. Personalities represent warriors, courtiers, scholars, monks and creatures of the empire. Almost every personality card has a unique name corresponding to a character in the story of Legend of the Five Rings; many characters have several versions, representing the evolution of the character over the course of the story. Many cards require a personality in play to be played; in addition, Personalities are necessary in order to attack or defend. Holdings, meanwhile, are used to produce gold, which is in turn used to pay for further cards.

=== Turn sequence ===
At the beginning of each of his or her turns, during the Straighten Phase, a player straightens all bowed (turned 90 degrees to indicate using an effect) cards he or she currently controls.

During the Events Phase, a player turns all of the face-down Dynasty cards in his or her provinces face-up. If these cards are regions or events, they immediately take effect. Regions (representing places in Rokugan) modify the province they are revealed in, while events (representing rare specific occurrences) have one global effect before being immediately discarded. Whenever a province becomes empty, the top card of the Dynasty deck is put into it, face-down.

The player then proceeds to the Action Phase, where he or she may purchase a variety of cards to improve personalities he or she controls. These cards, collectively known as attachments, are items (such as weapons and armor), followers (representing troops and retainers), spells, and ancestors (guiding spirits). During the limited phase, the player may also use certain abilities on cards in play or on action cards in hand; the latter are discarded when used. Other players may also take actions during this phase, but the abilities available to them are more limited.

The player then has the option of attacking opponents in the Attack Phase. If he or she does so, the attacking and defending players takes turn assigning personalities they control to attack or defend the defending player's provinces. The attacking player assigns first, allowing the defending player to position his or her cards in response to the attacking player's choices. Once all assignment is done, the battles at each province are played out, with players using abilities on cards they control or in hand in turn until both players pass; the battle is then resolved with the side having the highest total force becoming victorious. All cards on the losing side are destroyed; if the defending player loses, the province may also be destroyed. Destroyed provinces cannot hold Dynasty cards.

Once all battles (if any) are played out, the game moves on to the Dynasty Phase. The player may purchase face-up personality or holding cards in his or her provinces. The abilities of newly purchased holdings generally cannot be used until the beginning of their controller's next turn, whereas those of personalities can be used immediately. Once a player has no further actions, he or she draws a card from the Fate deck, then the turn ends.

=== Victory and defeat ===
There are several ways to achieve victory or defeat in Legend of the Five Rings.

A player may win the game by having his or her honor score (representing the public view of his or her clan) reach over 40, at which point he or she will win the game by an honor victory at the beginning of his or her next turn. A player may also win by playing all of the titular five rings, representing philosophical mastery of the universe; such a victory is called the enlightenment victory.

Another way to achieve victory is by eliminating all opposing players from the game. Players can be eliminated in two ways. The first is to destroy all of a player's provinces (military victory) while the second involves reducing another player's honor score below -19 (dishonor victory). Until Samurai Edition, published in 2007, victory by eliminating other players was termed "military victory" regardless of how the elimination was achieved.

In addition, several cards offer alternate, unique paths to victory or defeat, and certain factions are similarly immune to winning or losing the game in some ways.

== Release history ==
The history, story, and organized play rules of L5R are divided into a series of arcs. The beginning of each new arc redefines which cards may be used in tournament formats. Arcs typically begin with the publication of a base set of 300 or more cards, primarily reprinted older cards, followed by the release of several expansions of 50 to 180 new cards, and one promotional set, of variable size, which is sold directly to players by the manufacturer. Often, the last few expansions of one arc will be legal for play in the next arc; such cards are referred to as dual bugged, with circular indicators (bugs) at the bottom of the card indicating their legality.

Learn to play sets are standalone releases that allow new players to be easily introduced to the game. Several learn to play sets have been released over the course of the game's history. Generally, these sets feature particular flavor text and promotional cards relating to a specific event in the storyline.

=== The Clan War (Imperial Edition) ===
The Clan War arc began in October 1995 with the release of Imperial Edition. It initially had six legal factions for play (Crab Clan, Crane Clan, Dragon Clan, Lion Clan, Phoenix Clan and Unicorn Clan). Later expansions added six more : the Naga and Scorpion Clan in Shadowlands, Toturi's Army and Yogo Junzo's Army in Anvil of Despair, and Yoritomo's Alliance and The Brotherhood of Shinsei in Crimson and Jade. The learn to play set Battle at Beiden Pass was released in November 1996. The arc (and the game as a whole) was originally intended to end with Time of the Void, but was extended due to its popularity and ended with the release of Scorpion Clan Coup. The latter was released as three small sets of 50 cards each.

=== The Hidden Emperor (Jade Edition) ===
This arc began in May 1998 with the release of the Jade Edition base set. It consisted of over 450 cards, 50 of which were new and the rest reprints, and was followed by monthly expansion set releases of about 50 cards for the subsequent nine months.

The base set contained all twelve factions playable at the end of the Clan War arc, to which were later added the Ninja in Dark Journey Home, the Ratlings in Heroes of Rokugan, and the Spirits in The Spirit Wars. Heroes of Rokugan was the first promotional set, depicting certain past figures of Rokugan's history. The learn to play sets were Siege of Sleeping Mountain (May 1999) and Storms over Matsu Palace (July 2000).

=== The Four Winds (Gold Edition) ===
This arc began in July 2001 with the release of Gold Edition. Several factions were removed from the game, to retain only eight: the original six factions from Imperial Edition, the Scorpion Clan, and the Shadowlands Horde. In addition, all cards in Heroes of Rokugan remained legal for play. Later, in the Dark Allies expansion, Yoritomo's Alliance was re-introduced as the Mantis Clan. The promotional set was A Thousand Years of Darkness, depicting an alternate timeline where the Shadowlands Horde ruled over Rokugan. Instead of a learn to play set, during The L5R Experience (July 2002), simple demonstration decks were freely distributed.

=== The Rain of Blood (Diamond Edition) ===
This arc began in October 2003 with the release of Diamond Edition. It featured all the factions of the Four Winds arc (including Ratling), this time all fully supported. The promotional set was Dawn of the Empire, depicting events surrounding the creation of Rokugan. The learn to play set was The Training Grounds (November 2003).

=== The Age of Enlightenment (Lotus Edition) ===
This arc began in October 2005 with the release of Lotus Edition. Several significant rules changes marked this release, redefining several key concepts of the game. A new faction, the Spider Clan, was introduced at the very end of the Age of Enlightenment, with the release of The Truest Test. The promotional set was Test of Enlightenment, which, unlike previous promotional sets, depicted current events, focused on results of the 2006 tournament season. The learn to play set was The Training Grounds II (July 2006).

=== The Race for the Throne (Samurai Edition) ===
This arc began in July 2007 with the release of Samurai Edition. It featured significant faction changes, with the removal of the Ratlings and the Shadowlands Horde. The latter group was replaced with the newly introduced Spider Clan. The promotional set for the Samurai arc was The Emerald and Jade Champions, again depicting current events within the game, this time centered on the results of the 2007 World Championship. This arc did not feature a learn to play set.

=== The Destroyer War (Celestial Edition) ===
The arc began in June 2009 with the release of Celestial Edition. The story begins with events following the tournament story line of The War of Dark Fire. The promotional set was Forgotten Legacy. A bit apart from the other learn to play sets were The Imperial Gift (Part 1 to 3), released in August 2009 and distributed through Stronghold Stores as free sets. The learn to play set was Battle of Kyuden Tonbo (September 2010), featuring decks for Lion and Dragon.

=== The Age of Conquest (Emperor Edition) ===
This arc began with Emperor Edition. Originally scheduled for release November 2011, it was delayed until February 2012. The learn to play set, Honor and Treachery (December 2012), depicts a set of battles between the Phoenix and Scorpion clans.

=== Ivory Edition ===
This arc began with Ivory Edition, which released on March 24, 2014. The Ivory Edition sought to streamline the rules and make the card text easier to read and understand, with the intention of lowering the entry barrier for new players (the complexity level being seen as a stumbling block to new players) while at the same time retaining the deep play that established players enjoyed. The learn to play set is "A Matter of Honor" featured the Crab Clan and the Lion Clan and newly rewritten core rules of Ivory Edition.

== Reception ==
Steve Faragher reviewed Legend of the Five Rings for Arcane magazine, rating it an 8 out of 10 overall. Faragher comments that "Lo5R is a splendid game, redolent with the atmosphere of ancient Japan."

Pyramid magazine reviewed Legend of the Five Rings and stated that "Legends of the Five Rings is set in the mythical empire of Rokugan, drawing upon Japanese and Chinese lore and the Samurai/Ninja genre for a setting at once exotic and familiar. In Rokugan, the Emperor - last of the Imperial Family - is dying, prompting civil war as rival clans battle to determine his successor."

Wolfgang Baur comments: "In the case of collectible card games, the outstanding title after Magic: The Gathering is Legend of the Five Rings (known to its fans as L5R). It inspires loyalty and devotion in those fans unlike any other CCG, and for good reason." According to Matt Wilson of Alderac, the game had a strong following in Philadelphia and "towards New York" as well as stating "we own southern California".

In 1997, Legend of Five Rings: Battle of Beiden Pass won in a three-way tie the Origins Award for Best Card Game of 1996.

Legend of the Five Rings won the 2007 Origins Award for Best Collectible Card Game of the Year.

== See also ==
- Legend of the Burning Sands
- Legend of the Five Rings Role-Playing Game
- The Book of Five Rings
