= Wizards of the Coast =

American game publisher

Wizards of the Coast LLC
- Logo used since 2021
- Formerly: Wizards of the Coast, Inc. (1990–2009)
- Type: Subsidiary
- Industry: Entertainment
- Founded: 1990; 36 years ago
- Founder: Peter Adkison
- Headquarters: Renton, Washington, United States; 47°27′53″N 122°13′18″W
- Key people: Dan Ayoub (President); Tim Fields (VP, General Manager); David Schwartz (VP, Digital Publishing); Timothy O'Hara (SVP, Finance and Operations)
- Products: Collectible card games; role-playing games; video games; magazines
- Brands: Magic: The Gathering; Dungeons & Dragons; Pokémon Trading Card Game (1999–2003); Kaijudo Trading Card Game (2002–2014)
- Number of employees: 1,000+ (2020)
- Parent: Hasbro (1999–present)
- Subsidiaries: See § Studios
- Website: company.wizards.com

Wizards of the Coast LLC (WotC, /ˈwɒt.ˌsiː/), also known as Wizards, is an American game publisher, mostly of fantasy and science-fiction games, and formerly an operator of retail game stores. In 1999, toy manufacturer Hasbro acquired the company and currently operates it as a subsidiary. During a February 2021 reorganization of Hasbro, WotC became the lead part of a new division called "Wizards & Digital".

WotC was originally a role-playing game (RPG) publisher that in the mid-1990s originated and popularized collectible card games with Magic: The Gathering. It later acquired TSR, publisher of the RPG Dungeons & Dragons, and published the licensed Pokémon Trading Card Game from 1999 to 2003. WotC's corporate headquarters is located in Renton, Washington, which is part of the Seattle metropolitan area.

The company publishes RPGs, board games, and collectible card games. It has received numerous awards, including several Origins Awards. The company has also produced sets of sports cards and series for association football, baseball, basketball and American football.

== History ==
Original logo designed by Rich Kaalaas

Wizards of the Coast (WotC) was founded by Peter Adkison in 1990 outside of Seattle, Washington, and its current headquarters is located in nearby Renton. The company was named after a guild of wizards in a D&D campaign Adkison was playing. The company published RPGs such as the third edition of Talislanta and its own product The Primal Order (1992). The Primal Order was a supplement designed for use with any game system, but Palladium Books sued WotC for using references to Palladium's game and system. The suit was settled in 1993.

In 1991, Richard Garfield approached WotC with the idea for a new board game called RoboRally but Adkison rejected it because the game would have been too expensive to produce. Adkison asked Garfield if he could invent a game that was portable and quick-playing, and Garfield agreed.

Adkison set up a new corporation called Garfield Games to develop Garfield's collectible card game concept into Magic: The Gathering. The new company sheltered the game from the legal battle with Palladium. Garfield Games then licensed the production and sale rights to WotC until the court case was settled, at which point Garfield Games was shut down. WotC debuted Magic: The Gathering in July 1993 at Origins Game Fair in Dallas. The following month, the game was extremely popular at Gen Con, selling out of its supply of 2.5 million cards, which had been planned to last until the end of the year. The game's success generated revenue that grew the company in two years from a few employees working in Adkison's basement headquarters to 250 employees in its own offices. In 1994, Magic: The Gathering won the Mensa Top Five Mind Games award, and the Origins Awards for Best Fantasy or Science Fiction Board Game of 1993 and Best Graphic Presentation of a Board Game of 1993.

In 1994, WotC began an association with The Beanstalk Group, a brand-licensing agency and consultancy, to license the brand Magic: The Gathering. After the success of Magic: The Gathering, in 1994, WotC published RoboRally, which won the 1994 Origins Awards for "Best Fantasy or Science Fiction Board Game" and "Best Graphic Presentation of a Board Game". That same year, WotC also expanded its RPG line by buying SLA Industries from Nightfall Games and Ars Magica from White Wolf. In 1995, WotC published The Great Dalmuti, another card game by Richard Garfield, which won the 1995 Mensa Best New Mind Game award. In August 1995, WotC released Everway before closing its RPG product line four months later. Wizards' annual sales that year passed US$65 million.

=== Acquisition of TSR and Pokémon Trading Card Game ===
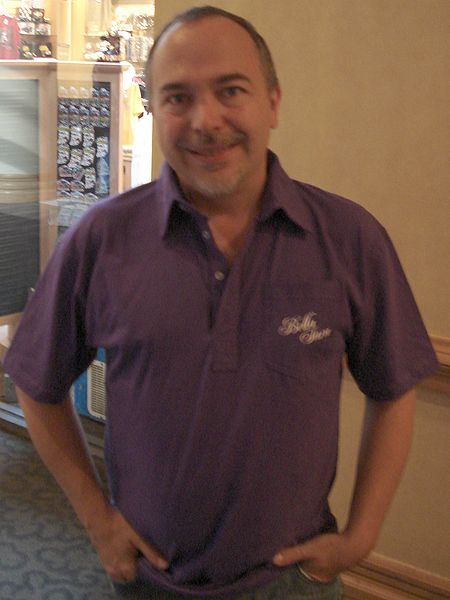
Peter Adkison, founder of Wizards of the Coast, at Gen Con Indy 2007

Wizards of the Coast announced the purchase of TSR, the publisher of Dungeons & Dragons, on April 10, 1997. The company acquired TSR and Five Rings Publishing Group for $25 million. As part of the transition, TSR employees were given the opportunity to relocate from Wisconsin to the West Coast. WotC continued to use the TSR brand name until 2000 and allowed the trademark to lapse in 2004. Between 1997 and 1999, the company discontinued several TSR campaign settings, including Planescape, Dark Sun, and Spelljammer, to focus the business on the more profitable Greyhawk and Forgotten Realms lines.

In mid 1997, WotC revisited the concept of a third edition of Dungeons & Dragons, having first discussed it soon after the purchase of TSR. WotC released the third edition of Dungeons & Dragons in 2000 with the d20 System. The company released these properties under the Open Game License (OGL), which allows other companies to make use of those systems.

The new edition of Dungeons & Dragons won multiple Origins Awards in 2000, such as Best Roleplaying Game for Dungeons & Dragons and Best Graphic Presentation of a Roleplaying Game, Adventure, or Supplement for the Monster Manual. In 2002, WotC sponsored a design contest for which designers could submit proposals to produce a new campaign world to the company. WotC selected "Eberron", which game designer Keith Baker submitted, and its first campaign book was released in June 2004. The Eberron Campaign Setting won the 2004 Origins Award for Best Role-Playing Supplement. In 2003, WotC released version 3.5 of Dungeons & Dragons and the d20 system. The 30th anniversary of the D&D game was celebrated at Gen Con Indy 2004.

==== Pokémon TCG ====
On August 2, 1997, Wizards of the Coast was granted U.S. patent 5,662,332 on collectible card games. In January 1999, WotC began publishing Pokémon Trading Card Game after acquiring the rights in August 1998. The game sold nearly 400,000 copies in less than six weeks and sold 10-times more units than initial projections. Some sports card series were discontinued in 1999 because so many printers were producing Pokémon cards. The game won the National Parenting Center's 1999 Seal of Approval.

Within a year, WotC had sold millions of copies of the Pokémon game and the company released a new set that included an instructional CD-ROM. WotC continued to publish the game until 2003. One of Nintendo's affiliates, The Pokémon Company (formerly Pokémon USA), began producing a new edition for the game one day after the last of its agreements with Wizards expired on September 30, 2003. The following day, WotC filed suit against Nintendo, accusing it of "abandoning a contract with Wizards, the longtime producer and distributor of Pokémon trading-card games, and using Wizards-patented methods and technology to manufacture the games itself". The companies resolved the legal action in December 2003 without going to court.

==== Retail stores ====
After the company's success in 1999 with Pokémon, Wizards of the Coast acquired and expanded The Game Keeper, a US chain of retail gaming stores, eventually changing its name to Wizards of the Coast. The company's gaming center in Seattle was closed in March 2001. In December 2003, WotC announced it would close all of its stores to allow it to concentrate on game design. The stores were closed in early 2004.

=== Acquisition by Hasbro ===
In September 1999, toy manufacturer Hasbro bought Wizards of the Coast for about US$325 million. Avalon Hill, which Hasbro had purchased in mid-1998, was made a division of WotC in late 1999. In November 1999, WotC announced Gen Con would leave Milwaukee after the 2002 convention. Also in November, Vince Caluori became President of WotC.

On January 1, 2001, Peter Adkison resigned from WotC. In August 2001, the company, which had been a semi-independent division of Hasbro, was consolidated into Hasbro's game division. According to trade magazine ICv2: "this is seen as a loss of autonomy for WotC by most. The Hasbro release specified that despite the consolidation at the management level, WotC will continue to operate out of its Seattle offices." Between 2001 and 2002, Hasbro sold Origins Game Fair to Game Manufacturers Association (GAMA), and in May 2002, it sold Gen Con to Peter Adkison.

=== 2000–2010 ===
In 2000, Wizards of the Coast introduced the Open Game License (OGL), which allowed the production of a wide range of unofficial commercial derivative works based on the mechanics of Dungeons and Dragons; it is credited with increasing the market share of d20 products and leading to a "boom in the RPG industry in the early 2000s". Chuck Huebner became president and CEO of Wizards of the Coast in June 2002. In 2003, the company employed 850 people.

Throughout the early 2000s, WotC won multiple Origins Awards, including: 2001 Best Role-Playing Game Supplement (Forgotten Realms Campaign Setting) and the Best Game Related Novel (Clan War 7th Scroll: The Lion); 2002 Best Role-Playing Adventure (City of the Spider Queen); 2005 Collectible Card Game or Expansion of the Year (Ravnica: City of Guilds expansion for Magic: The Gathering) and Gamer's Choice Best Historical Game of the Year (Axis and Allies Collectible Miniatures Game), and the 2006 Miniature or Miniatures Line of the Year (Colossal Red Dragon). It also won the 2002 Gold Ennie Award for "Best Publisher" and the 2006 Silver Ennie Award for "Fan's Choice for Best Publisher".

In 2002, Wizards of the Coast's periodicals department was spun off; WotC outsourced its magazines by licensing Dungeon, Dragon, Polyhedron, and Amazing Stories to former VP Lisa Stevens' Paizo Publishing. The license expired in September 2007 and WotC began publishing the magazines online. In 2003, WotC released Dungeons & Dragons miniatures; collectible, painted, plastic miniature games. In 2004, the company added a licensed Star Wars line. In April 2004, Loren Greenwood succeeded Huebner as the subsidiary's president. That same year, Avalon Hill became a subsidiary of WotC.

In early 2006, WotC filed a lawsuit against Daron Rutter, who was the administrator of the website MTG Salvation. The lawsuit said Rutter publicly posted confidential prototypes of upcoming Magic: The Gathering card sets to the MTG Salvation forums, ten months before the cards were to be released. The lawsuit was settled out of court, according to Mark Rosewater.

Greg Leeds succeeded Greenwood as president and CEO of WotC in March 2008. On June 6, 2008, Wizards released the fourth edition of Dungeons & Dragons, and began introducing fourth-edition online content in Dragon and Dungeon magazines.

Throughout the 2000s, WotC released new editions of Magic: The Gathering. In 2009, WotC announced a new edition called Magic 2010, which coincided with the first major rules change to Magic since the Revised Edition was released in 1994.

By 2008, the company employed over 300 people and went through a restructuring. On April 6, 2009, WotC suspended all sales of its products for the Dungeons & Dragons games in PDF format from places such as OneBookShelf, and its online storefronts RPGNow and DriveThruRPG. The company launched a lawsuit against eight people to prevent future copyright infringement of its books, including fourth-edition Dungeons & Dragons products that were sold through these places, and all older editions PDFs of the game.

=== 2010–2020 ===
Wizards of the Coast logo from 2010 to 2021

In 2012, Ethan Gilsdorf writing for The New York Times reported sales of Dungeons & Dragons products had slumped. Despite the company not releasing sales figures, analysts and gaming experts noted sales had been declining. That year, WotC announced a public playtest to develop a new edition of Dungeons & Dragons called D&D Next. The 5th edition of Dungeons & Dragons was released on July 15, 2014, with the Dungeons & Dragons Starter Set. In 2014, 126,870 units of the Dungeons & Dragons Starter Set were sold, and in 2018, 306,670 units of the product were sold.

Throughout the 2010s, WotC and its products continued to earn awards. This included multiple 2015 Origins Awards, such as: Role-Playing Game Fan Favorite (Dungeon & Dragons: Players Handbook), Role-Playing Supplement Fan Favorite (Dungeon & Dragons: Monster Manual), and Collectible Card Game (Magic the Gathering: Khans of Tarkir). WotC won the 2015 Gold Ennie Award for "Fan's Choice for Best Publisher" and won the 2017 Gold Ennie Awards for "Fan's Choice for Best Publisher".

In 2014, 20th Century Fox acquired the screen rights to Magic: The Gathering to produce a movie series with Simon Kinberg attached to the project. Also in 2014, WotC filed a lawsuit against Cryptozoic Entertainment and Hex Entertainment alleging their online card game Hex: Shards of Fate was a clone of Magic: The Gathering. The three companies agreed to a settlement the following year. In 2015, it was reported an estimated 20 million people played Magic: The Gathering and that the game had tournaments, a professional league, and a weekly organized game program called Friday Night Magic.

Since the release of the 5th edition, WotC has published more than twenty Dungeon & Dragons books, including new rulebooks, campaign guides and adventure modules. According to The Seattle Times, 2017 had "the most number of players in its history". Writing for Bloomberg, Mary Pilon reported sales of the 5th edition of Dungeon & Dragons rose 41 percent in 2017 compared to the year before, and in 2018 rose another 52 percent. Pilon also said in 2017, nine million people watched others play D&D on the video-sharing platform Twitch.

In 2016, WotC partnered with OneBookShelf to create an online community-content platform called Dungeon Masters Guild (DMsGuild) that allowed creators to make and sell content using WotC's properties. Users of DMsGuild could also purchase earlier editions of Dungeon & Dragons as PDFs and as print-on-demand books.

In 2016, Chris Cocks replaced Greg Leeds as president of WotC. Giaco Furino writing for Vice reported high tensions over deadlines at the company. In 2019, WotC became a member of the Entertainment Software Association.

In April 2019, WotC announced the appointment of gaming-industry veteran James Ohlen as the head of its new studio in Austin, Texas; in January 2020 the new studio was revealed to be Archetype Entertainment. In June 2019, internet-streaming service Netflix announced WoTC would work with Anthony and Joe Russo to create an animated series based on the mythology of Magic: The Gathering. The Russo brothers were executive producers on the series, with writers Henry Gilroy and Jose Molina as showrunners, and Bardel Entertainment worked on animation. In July 2019, Joe Deaux reported in Bloomberg: "Magic is part of the [Hasbro's] 'franchise brands', a segment that accounted for $2.45 billion in net revenue for the company last year". According to Chris Cocks, Magic accounted for a "meaningful portion" of that sum and KeyBanc estimated the game's contribution was more than $500 million of the franchise brands.

In 2019, WotC released a Hearthstone competitor called Magic: The Gathering Arena, which is a free-to-play digital collectible card game with microtransaction purchases. It had been In open beta testing since September 2018. Brett Andress, an analyst at KeyBanc Capital Markets, predicted Magic: The Gathering Arena would boost earnings by at least 20 percent.

=== The 2020s ===
==== 2020–2023: Revenue gains, product expansion and the OGL ====
In February 2020, during a Hasbro earnings call, CEO Brian Goldner said Wizards of the Coast was delivering positive results and that Hasbro planned to double WotC's revenues between 2018 and 2023. He also reported revenues from Magic: The Gathering had increased by over 30 percent; Magic: The Gathering Arena had a strong first year and Dungeons & Dragons revenues grew for the seventh consecutive year. Dungeons & Dragons virtual play increased by 86 percent during 2020, due to the COVID-19 pandemic.

On June 1, 2020, after the murder of George Floyd, WotC released a statement in support of its Black fans, employees, and community members. This provoked a backlash; multiple open letters that criticized the company for its treatment of people of color and documented issues with the company's actions were published. The New York Times, Polygon, and Kotaku reported following this criticism, WotC banned seven Magic: The Gathering cards that were deemed racially offensive from tournament-sanctioned play. The D&D team announced it would be changing portions of its fifth-edition product line that fans had criticized for being insensitive, such as races characterized as monstrous and evil. The company also announced plans to change character creation to broaden the range of character types and adding a sensitivity disclaimer to some legacy products. The Washington Post reported the tabletop community has widely approved of these changes, although Wired criticized some of the change attempts as often feeling "like lip service".

During its 2021 Investor Event, Hasbro announced the company would be reorganized into three divisions: Consumer Products, Entertainment, and Wizards & Digital. The announcement was paired with a rebrand including a new logo and refreshed website for WotC. Also in 2021, WotC opened a new video-game studio, whose first project was a high-budget game based on the G.I. Joe franchise. In 2022, Chris Cocks became CEO of Hasbro and Cynthia Williams replaced him as president of Wizards & Digital. In July 2022, WotC announced it was establishing another new video-game studio called Skeleton Key, which would focus on AAA games and would be headed by Christian Dailey, formerly of BioWare.

In April 2022, Hasbro acquired the digital toolset and game companion D&D Beyond from Fandom, and transferred control to WotC the following month. At the Hasbro Investor Event in October 2022, it was announced Dan Rawson, former chief operating officer (COO) of Microsoft Dynamics 365 was appointed to the newly created position of Senior Vice President for the Dungeons & Dragons brand to act as head of the franchise. According to Dicebreaker, Rawson's role was "part of Wizards' plans to apply more resources to the digital side of D&D" following Hasbro's purchase of D&D Beyond.

In 2022, The Gamer and Kotaku reported on the increased product-release schedule for Magic: The Gathering; The Gamer said it was leading to exhaustion within the community. Vice commented there was "a growing divide in the Magic: The Gathering community between the casual players and the collectors" because "some rich collectors have turned the cards into a kind of commodities market", and that "Wizards of the Coast has increasingly catered to this kind of consumer", leading to products that are too expensive for many casual players. In November 2022, CNBC reported: "Bank of America downgraded the stock of Wizard of the Coast's owner, Hasbro"; analyst Jason Haas stated changes to the Magic: The Gathering brand "amount to Hasbro 'killing its golden goose'" and that the "primary concern" is the overproduction of "Magic cards which has propped up Hasbro's recent results but is destroying the long-term value of the brand".

Between November and December 2022, there was speculation based on unconfirmed leaks saying WotC was planning to discontinue the OGL for Dungeons & Dragons. Following a WotC response to the speculation, the company released limited details of an update to the OGL the following month. Linda Codega, writing for Io9, reported on the details from a leaked full copy of the OGL 1.1 on January 5, 2023. Codega said: "every single licensed publisher will be affected by the new agreement ... The main takeaway from the leaked OGL 1.1 draft document is that WotC is keeping power close at hand." ICv2 commented the leaked OGL had several controversial parts. Following this leak, numerous news-and-industry-focused outlets reported on negative reactions from fans and professional content creators. (Note: Such as:Financial Times, Vice, The Guardian, CNBC, NME, IGN, ICv2, Inverse, and ComicBook.com.) TheStreet said WotC's main competitors quickly moved away from the OGL in the time it took WotC to settle on a response. Both Kobold Press and MCDM Productions announced upcoming new open tabletop RPG systems. Paizo announced a new Open RPG Creative License (ORC), a system-agnostic license, and other publishers joined the development of this new license. (Note: Such as: Kobold Press, Chaosium, Green Ronin, Legendary Games, and Rogue Genius Games.) TheStreet also said WotC had united its player base against it; both TheStreet and Io9 noted the movement to boycott D&D Beyond and mass subscription cancellations; Io9 stated the "immediate financial consequences" forced a response by WotC. Io9 also reported WotC's internal messaging on the response to the leak was this was a fan overreaction.

In the following weeks, WotC reversed changes to the OGL and solicited public feedback (Note: OGL1.2, with an open feedback period, was announced on January 13, 2023.) before moving away from the OGL and releasing the System Reference Document 5.1 (SRD 5.1) under an irrevocable creative commons license (CC-BY-4.0). (Note: System Reference Document 5.1 was announced and became effective immediately on January 27, 2023. Additionally, Wizards announced it would no longer pursue deauthorizing the OGL1.0a.) Edwin Evans-Thirlwell of The Washington Post wrote: "pushback from fans, who criticized WotC's response as far from an apology and a dismissal of their legitimate concerns, led WotC to backpedal further" and that the company "appears to have committed an irreversible act of self-sabotage in trying to replace [the OGL]—squandering the prestige accumulated over 20 years in a matter of weeks". Both Io9 and ComicBook.com called the major concessions by WotC a "huge victory" for the Dungeons & Dragons community. The Motley Fool said the "abrupt volte-face" was "an abject failure for Hasbro's business" if the assumed goal was to increase monetization of "Dungeons & Dragons properties, grow revenue for Hasbro, and earn more profits for Hasbro shareholders".

==== 2023–present: Video game cancelations, layoffs and unionization ====
Also in January 2023, WotC canceled at least five unnamed video-game projects; an internal project code-named Jabberwocky, and two games that were in the early development stages. Jason Schreier writing for Bloomberg News said fewer than 15 people at WotC would lose their jobs but "the reorganization will land hard for several independent studios such as Boston-based OtherSide Entertainment and Bellevue, Washington-based Hidden Path Entertainment, both of which were working on games for Wizards of the Coast". In February 2023, Markets Insider reported Bank of America continued to rate Hasbro's stock as underperforming and said the company "faces a steep decline in its share price if it continues to 'destroy customer goodwill'" by over-monetizing brands within its Wizards segment.

In April 2023, WotC sent private detectives from the Pinkerton agency to the house of a Magic: The Gathering YouTuber, who said the agents demanded he destroy cards from an unreleased set he had been accidentally sent, and to remove videos from his channel, otherwise he and his wife would face a $200,000 fine and imprisonment. WotC's action was widely condemned and criticized, and the game's players subsequently initiated a boycott in response.

In December 2023, TechCrunch reported that paperwork Hasbro filed with the SEC contained information announcing layoffs of 1,100 employees (20 percent of their entire workforce across all divisions) effective immediately. A wide range of WotC employees were laid off; Chase Carter of Dicebreaker commented: "past successes and future plans could not save Wizards of the Coast's workers from the hungry maw of corporate line-item reduction, and the full extent of this culling remains to be seen".

In March 2024, Wizards of the Coast stopped localizing Magic: The Gathering and Dungeons & Dragons for Portuguese. The company received a vampetaço in retaliation. Cynthia Williams resigned at the end of April 2024 and was replaced that summer by John Hight, who left his long-time role at Blizzard Entertainment to take the job. The 3D virtual tabletop (VTT) Dungeons & Dragons simulator Sigil launched as part of D&D Beyond in March 2025. Later that month, approximately 90% of the development team were laid off by WotC; in an internal communication, Hasbro Direct senior vice president Dan Rawson stated "our aspirations for Sigil as a large, standalone game with a distinct monetization path will not be realized". In October 2025, it was announced that Sigil development had ended and its servers would be shut down at the end of October 2026.

Following the release of core rulebooks for the 2024 revision of Dungeons & Dragons, Creative Director Chris Perkins and Game Director Jeremy Crawford announced their departures from the company in April 2025. Christian Hoffer, for Screen Rant, highlighted that both "have been part of the Dungeons & Dragons design team for decades and were two of the lead designers of" Dungeons & Dragons 5th Edition. In April 2026, Magic: The Gathering Arena employees announced their intention to form Wizards of the Coast's first union, United Wizards of the Coast – Communications Workers of America (UWOTC-CWA). After Wizards of the Coast missed the deadline to voluntarily recognize, the union was officially formed via election in June 2026. In October 2026, the Dungeons & Dragons and D&D Beyond teams as well as Studio X, the team that develops Magic: The Gathering and Duel Masters, announced their intention to form a union as part of UWOTC-CWA. Wizards of the Coast declined voluntary recognition. Also in 2026, Dungeons & Dragons Head Dan Ayoub became President of Wizards of the Coast and Hasbro Digital Games, replacing Hight who stepped down after two years in the role.

== Studios ==
- Archetype Entertainment in Austin, Texas, U.S.; opened in April 2019.
- Atomic Arcade in Raleigh, North Carolina, led by Ames Kirshen, formerly vice-president of production and creative at Warner Bros. Interactive Entertainment (WBIE), opened in September 2021.
- D&D Beyond; founded in 2017, acquired in May 2022.
- Invoke Studios in Montreal, Quebec, Canada; founded in 2012, acquired in October 2019.
- Mirrorstone Books; opened in 2004.
- Studio X in Renton, Washington, U.S.; reorganization of Magic: The Gathering R&D in 2018.
- Skeleton Key in Austin, Texas; opened in July 2022.
- Wizards Kids Studio in Seattle, Washington, U.S.; opened in December 2020.

=== Former ===
- Avalon Hill in Renton, Washington, U.S.; founded 1952, acquired by Hasbro in 1998, moved to Wizards of the Coast in 2004, moved back to Hasbro Gaming in 2021.
- Last Unicorn Games in Philadelphia, Pennsylvania, U.S.; founded in 1994, acquired and dissolved in 2000.
- TSR, Inc. in Lake Geneva, Wisconsin, U.S.; founded in 1973, acquired and dissolved in 1997.

== See also ==
- List of Wizards of the Coast products
