= 2003 ENnie Award winners =

- Awarded for: Best role-playing games of previous year
- Country: United Kingdom & United States
- Presented by: Gen Con
- First award: 2001

The following are the winners of the 3rd annual ENnie Awards, held in 2003:

== List of winners ==
Category	Gold Winner	Silver Winner
Best Cartography	Lock and Load (Privateer Press)	Necropolis (Necromancer Games)
Best Art, Cover	Monsternomicon (Privateer Press)	Midnight (Fantasy Flight Games)
Best Art, Interior	Monsternomicon (Privateer Press)	Freedom City (Green Ronin Publishing)
Best Graphic Design and Layout	Monsternomicon (Privateer Press)	Freedom City (Green Ronin Publishing)
Best Adventure	The Banewarrens (Malhavoc Press)	The Vault of Larin Karr (Necromancer Games)
Best Monster Supplement	Tome of Horrors (Necromancer Games)	Monsternomicon (Privateer Press)
Best Campaign Setting	Midnight (Fantasy Flight Games)	Freedom City (Green Ronin Publishing)
Best Setting Supplement	Magical Medieval Society: Western Europe (Expeditious Retreat Press)	The Book of the Righteous (Green Ronin Publishing)
Best Rules Supplement	Dynasties & Demagogues (Atlas Games)	Toolbox (AEG)
Best d20 Game	Mutants & Masterminds (Green Ronin Publishing)	Sláine: The Roleplaying Game of Celtic Heroes (Mongoose Publishing)
Best Non-Open-Gaming Product	Unknown Armies 2nd Edition (Atlas Games)	Spaceship Zero (Green Ronin Publishing)
Best Aid or Accessory	GM Mastery: NPC Essentials (RPG Objects)	Kingdoms of Kalamar DM Shield (Kenzer & Company)
Best Official Website	Malhavoc Press	Wizards of the Coast
Best Resource Fan Site	SWRPG Network	3rdEdition.org
Best Campaign Web Site	Conan d20	World of Inzeladun
Best Free Product or Web Enhancement	Magical Medieval City Guide (Expeditious Retreat Press)	Initiative Cards (The Game Mechanics)
Best Electronic Product	Magical Medieval City Guide (Expeditious Retreat Press)	Mindscapes (Malhavoc Press)
Best Publisher	Malhavoc Press	Green Ronin Publishing

Peer Award: Mutants & Masterminds (Green Ronin Publishing)
