= Larry Correia bibliography =

Works of the American fantasy and sci-fi writer

This is the bibliography of American fantasy and science fiction writer Larry Correia.

== Academy of Outcasts ==
Epic Progression Fantasy series

- Academy of Outcast (October 2025, Aethon Books, ISBN 1638493030)
- Academy of Outcast Book 2: Magic and Bullets (May 2026, Aethon Books)ISBN 978-1638493815)
- Academy of Outcast Book 3:Reap the Whirlwind (forthcoming April 2027, Aethon Books)
- Academy of Outcast Book 4 (announced, Aethon Books)
- Academy of Outcast Book 5 (announced, Aethon Books)
- Academy of Outcast Book 6 (announced, Aethon Books)

== The Age of Ravens ==
1. Servants of War with Steve Diamond (March 2022, Baen Books)
2. Instruments of Violence with Steve Diamond (Announced, Baen Books)

== American Paladin ==
Series of books and a graphics novel published by Ark Press. "A contemporary fantasy with monsters and supernatural elements. It is set in the western US and the main story takes place in 2022."

1. American Paladin (June 2026, Ark Press) ISBN 978-1945649554)
- Graphic novel drawn by Alex Wisner (Announced, Ark Press)
- Book 2 (Announced, Ark Press)

== The Crimson Pact ==
These are all short works.

- "Bull King" in The Crimson Pact, Volume 1 edited by Paul Genesse (August 2011, Alliteration Ink, ISBN 978-0-9832631-5-9)
- "Son of Fire, Son of Thunder" in The Crimson Pact, Volume 2 edited by Paul Genesse (October 2011, Alliteration Ink, ISBN 978-0-9840065-0-2)
- "That Which We Fear" in The Crimson Pact, Volume 3 edited by Paul Genesse (May 2012, Alliteration Ink, ISBN 978-0-9840065-5-7)

== Dead Six ==
This near-future series was co-authored with Mike Kupari.

1. Dead Six (September 2011, Baen Books, ISBN 1-45163-758-6)
2. Swords of Exodus (September 2013, Baen Books, ISBN 978-1-47673-611-2)
3. Alliance of Shadows (October 2016, Baen Books, ISBN 9781476781853)

Short works set in the Dead Six universe:

- "Sweothi City" (2013, Baen Free Library, prequel short story), first print appearance in Target Rich Environment, Volume 1

In May 2025 Larry said on X talking about future Dead Six stories " We've (Larry and Mike) talked about an "Old Man Lorenzo" and possibly returning to the Dead Six universe, but that's back burner for now. The idea of that mean bastard as a senior citizen is hilarious to me though."

== The Grimnoir Chronicles ==
The original series is set in an alternate history version of the 1930s. A second Grimnoir series set in the 1950s has been announced.

Original trilogy

1. Hard Magic (May 2011, Baen Books, ISBN 1-43913-434-0)
2. Spellbound (November 2011, Baen Book, ISBN 1-45163-775-6)
3. Warbound (August 2013, Baen Books, ISBN 978-1-4516-3908-7)

Short works set in the Grimnoir universe:

- "Detroit Christmas" in the Baen Free Library (2011, prequel short story); first print appearance in Target Rich Environment, Volume 1
- "Murder on the Orient Elite" (December 2014, Audible Studios), first print appearance in Target Rich Environment, Volume 1
  - Jake Sullivan and the nefarious crime lord Dr. Wells try to stop the sabotage of a luxury airship.
- "Tokyo Raider" (October 2014, Audible Studios), first print appearance in Target Rich Environment, Volume 2
  - Joe Sullivan is loaned the Imperium to drive a giant robot to battle a super demon.
- "Bombshell" in Noir Fatale (May 2019)
  - Henry Garrett is trying to find an active murderer in 1950s New York City.

== Gun Runner ==
- Gun Runner with John D. Brown (February 2021, Baen Books, ISBN 978-1-9821-2516-5)

Short works set in the Gun Runner universe

- "Gun Runner Graphic novel Volume 1" with Mike Baron (Forthcoming, Hound Dog Media)

- "A Tank Named Bob" in World Breakers edited by Tony Daniel and Christopher Ruocchio (August 2021, Baen Books ISBN 978-1-9821-2551-6)

=== Lost Planet Homicide Audible Series ===
1. "Lost Planet Homicide" – Audible novella (October 2021, Audible Studios)
2. "Ghosts of Zenith" - Audible novella (January 2023, Audible Studios)
3. "The Five Points Ripper" - Audible novella (September 2024, Audible Studios)

== Iron Kingdoms ==
These stories are set in the Iron Kingdoms wargaming universe. There are currently no plans for more Malcontents novellas.

- Instruments of War (ebook and audiobook only, April 2013, Privateer Press, ISBN 978-1-939480-07-1)
1. Into the Storm (August 2013, Privateer Press, ISBN 978-1-939480-36-1)
2. Into the Wild (April 2016, Privateer Press, ISBN 978-1-943693-11-5)

Short works in this series:

- "Destiny of a Bullet" in Called to Battle: Volume One, an anthology of short works by Correia, Erik Scott de Bie, Orrin Grey, and Howard Tayler (ebook and audiobook only, September 2013, Privateer Press ISBN 978-1-939480-43-9), later printed in Target Rich Environment, Volume 1
- "The Worthy" in Iron Kingdoms Excursions: Season One: Volume Two (ebook only, March 2014, Privatfeer Press, ISBN 978-1-939480-62-0)
- "Step Outside" in Iron Kingdoms Excursions: Season One: Volume Four (ebook only, May 2014, Privateer Press, ISBN 978-1-939480-65-1)
- "Murder in the Honor Fields" in Iron Kingdoms Excursions: Season One: Volume Six (ebook only, August 2014, Privateer Press, ISBN 978-1-939480-71-2)
- "Hold Back the Dark" in Iron Kingdoms Excursions: Season Two: Volume Two (November 2014, Privateer Press, ISBN 978-1-939480-79-8)

== Monster Hunter International ==
The main series follows Owen Zastava Pitt as he joins Monster Hunter International, a secret monster fighting company that has been around for over 100 years.

1. Monster Hunter International (December 2007, Infinity Publishing, ISBN 0-74144-456-9; republished July 2009, Baen Books, ISBN 978-1-43913-285-2)
2. Monster Hunter Vendetta (September 2010, Baen Books, ISBN 1-43913-391-3)
3. Monster Hunter Alpha (August 2011, Baen Books, ISBN 1-43913-458-8)
4. Monster Hunter Legion (September 2012, Baen Books, ISBN 978-1-4516-3796-0)
5. Monster Hunter Nemesis (July 2014, Baen Books, ISBN 978-1-4767-3655-6)
6. Monster Hunter Siege (August 2017, Baen Books, ISBN 978-1-4814-8255-4)
7. Monster Hunter Guardian with Sarah A. Hoyt (August 2019, Baen Books, ISBN 978-1-4814-8414-5)
8. Monster Hunter Bloodlines (August 2021, Baen Books, ISBN 978-1-9821-2549-3)
9. Monster Hunter Trespass (announced, Baen Books)
10. Monster Hunter Omega (announced, Baen Books)

Monster Hunter Memoirs
A spin-off series of novels set at different times in the MHI universe.
- Chad Gardenier series. Written with John Ringo and set in the 1980s.
  1. Monster Hunter Memoirs: Grunge (August 2016, Baen Books, ISBN 978-1-4767-8149-5)
  2. Monster Hunter Memoirs: Sinners (December 2016, Baen Books, ISBN 978-1-47678183-9)
  3. Monster Hunter Memoirs: Saints (July 2018, Baen Books, ISBN 9781481483070)
- Story of Chloe Mendoza set in 1970s California.
  1. Monster Hunter Memoirs: Fever with Jason Cordova (October 2023, Baen Books, ISBN 978-1982192938)
  2. Monster Hunter Memoirs: Fever 2 (announced, Baen Books)
  3. Monster Hunter Memoirs: Fever 3 (announced, Baen Books)
- Monster Hunter Alien Files: First Contact with Les Johnson (forthcoming December 2026, Baen Books), ISBN 978-1668073575

Anthologies, collections, and game books

- The Monster Hunters, a collection of Monster Hunter International, Monster Hunter Vendetta, and Monster Hunter Alpha (May 2012, Baen Books, ISBN 978-1-4516-3784-7)
- The Monster Hunter Files, co-edited with Bryan Thomas Schmidt (anthology, October 2017, Baen Books, ISBN 978-1-4814-8275-2)
- Monster Hunter Fantom, translation by Jakub Mařík (anthology, May 2024, Baen Books, ISBN 978-1-62579-975-3)
- The Monster Hunter Files 2, co-edited with Jason Cordova (anthology, March 2026, Baen Books) ISBN 978-1668073179)
- The Monster Hunter International Employee's Handbook and Roleplaying Game (July 2013, Hero Games, ISBN 978-1-58366-146-8)
- Monster Hunter International: The Roleplaying Game by Steven S. Long. Uses the Savage Worlds system. (September 2020, Gallant Knight Games, ISBN 978-0578555294)

The following short stories are set in the MHI universe:

- "Tanya: Princess of the Elves" in Free Short Stories 2011 (short story, January 2011, Baen Books) first print appearance in Target Rich Environment, Volume 1
- Vignettes in The Monster Hunter International Employee's Handbook and Roleplaying Game (2013):
  - "At Your Service"
  - "Maxim-um Fun"
  - "Down the Chimney"
  - "Archer's First Day"
  - "It's in the Blood"
- "Bubba Shackleford's Professional Monster Killers" in Straight Outta Tombstone, edited by David Boop (short story, July 2017, Baen Books, ISBN 978-1-4814-8269-1)
- "Thistle" in The Monster Hunter Files, edited by Correia and Bryan Thomas Schmidt (October 2017)
- "Blood on the Water" in Target Rich Environment, written with Hinckley Correia (short story, September 2018, Baen Books, ISBN 1481483447)
- "Weaponized Hell" – Crossover with Joe Ledger series in Target Rich Environment 2 (short story, December 2019, Baen Books, ISBN 1982124229)
- "Lawyer Fight" in Overruled, edited by Hank Davis and Christopher Ruocchio (short story, April 2020, Baen Books, ISBN 1982124504)
- "Reckoning Day" in Target Rich Environment 2 (short story, December 2019, Baen Books, ISBN 1982124229)
- "Allegation of an Honorable Man" in No Game for Knights (short story, September 2022, Baen Books, ISBN 1-982192-08-9

== Saga of the Forgotten Warrior ==
Epic fantasy series.

1. Son of the Black Sword (November 2015, Baen Books, ISBN 978-1-47678-086-3)
2. House of Assassins (February 2019, Baen Books, ISBN 978-1-481483766)
3. Destroyer of Worlds (December 2020, Baen Books, ISBN 978-1-9821-2484-7)
4. Tower of Silence (April 2023, Baen Books ISBN 978-1-982192532)
5. Graveyard of Demons (November 2024, Baen Books ISBN 978-1982193737)
6. Heart of the Mountain (February 2025, ISBN 978-1668072394)

The following short stories are set in this world:

- "The Keeper of Names" in Shattered Shields edited by Jennifer Brozek and Bryan Thomas Schmidt (October 2014, Baen Books, ISBN 978-1-4767-3701-0)
  - This short story is part of the Son of the Black Sword novel.
- "The Testimony of the Traitor Ratul" on the Baen website (January 2019, Baen Books)
  - This short story was retooled to be the introduction of Heart of the Mountain Book 6 when Graveyard of Demons Book 5 was broken into two books.

== Tom Stranger ==
The adventures of an interdimensional insurance agent named Tom Stranger, released as a series of short fiction (novella length or shorter). First published as audiobooks and narrated by Adam Baldwin.

- The Adventures of Tom Stranger, Interdimensional Insurance Agent (audiobook, May 2016, Audible Studios), first print appearance in Target Rich Environment, Volume 1
- A Murder of Manatees (audiobook, January 2018, Audible Studios), first print appearance in Target Rich Environment, Volume 2
- #1 in Customer Service (audiobook, November 2019, Audible Studios), contained the following short fiction:
  - "Doughnut Run"
  - "Apocalypse Cow"
  - "The Custies"
- "The Tuckerizing" in Give Me LibertyCon edited by Christopher Woods and Toni Weisskopf (anthology, June 2020, Baen books, ISBN 1982124644)

In May 2025 Larry said on X talking about future Tom Stranger stories, "Tom Stranger? Hard to say. I love Tom but Tom Stranger stories just kind of spring into existence when current events converge in a particularly silly way."

== V Wars ==
This is a horror series created by Jonathan Maberry set in a world where a virus turns some of the population into vampires. These are all short fiction.

- "Force Multiplier" in V Wars: Blood and Fire edited by Jonathan Maberry (July 2014, IDW Publishing, ISBN 978-1-63140-027-8)
- "Absence of Light" (two parts) in V Wars: Night Terrors edited by Jonathan Maberry (March 2015, IDW Publishing, ISBN 978-1-63140-272-2)

== Short story collections ==
- Target Rich Environment, Volume 1 (September 2018, Baen Books, ISBN 978-1-4814-8344-5)
- Target Rich Environment, Volume 2 (December 2019, Baen Books, ISBN 978-1-9821-2422-9)

== Non-fiction ==
- In Defense of the Second Amendment (January 2023, Regnery Publishing, ISBN 978-1-6845-1414-4)

== As editor ==
- Monster Hunter Files with Bryan Thomas Schmidt (October 2017, Baen Books, ISBN 978-1481483520)
- Noir Anthologies series looking at the topics of the femme fatale, hardboiled detectives, and the cities which these stories happen. This series is co-edited with Kacey Ezell:
  - Noir Fatale (May 2020, Baen Books, ISBN 978-1481483971)
  - No Game for Knights (September 2022, Baen Books, ISBN 978-1982192082))
  - Down These Mean Streets (January 2024, Baen Books)ISBN 978-1982193126))

== Other short works ==
- "The Christmas (Noun)" (December 2008, on author website), later collected in A Fantastic Holiday Season edited by Kevin J. Anderson (October 2013, Wordfire Press, ISBN 978-1-61475-093-2)
- "The Christmas (Noun) 2: The (Noun)ening" (December 2009, on author website)
- "The Christmas (Noun) 3D: The Gritty Reboot" (December 2010, on author website)
- "Christmas Noun 4: Occupy Christmas Noun" (December 2011, on author website)
- "Christmas Noun 5: Fifty Shades of Noun, Choose Your Own Adventure Edition" (December 2012, on author website)
- "Dead Waits Dreaming" in Space Eldritch II: The Haunted Stars edited by Nathan Shumate (November 2013, Cold Fusion Media, ISBN 978-0-615-91859-4)
- "Christmas Noun 6: Yes, Wendell, There Really Is a Christmas Noun" (December 2013, on author website)
- "Great Sea Beast" in Kaiju Rising: Age of Monsters edited by Tim Marquitz and Nick Sharps (May 2014, Ragnarok, ISBN 978-0-9913605-6-7)
- "Father's Day" in Shared Nightmares edited by Steven Diamond (November 2014, Cold Fusion Media, ISBN 978-0-692-34270-1)
- "Christmas Noun 7: Attack of the Social Justice Noun" (December 2014, on author website)
- "The Losing Side" in Onward, Drake! edited by Mark L. Van Name (October 2015, Baen Books, ISBN 978-1-4767-8088-7)
- "Christmas Noun 8: Too Noun Much Adjective" (December 2015, on author website)
- "The Bridge" in Champions of Aetaltis edited by John Helfers and Marc Tassin (April 2016, Mechanical Muse, ISBN 978-0-9905296-4-4)
- "Shooter Ready" in Galactic Games edited by Bryan Thomas Schmidt (June 2016, Baen Books, ISBN 978-1-4767-8158-7)
- "Weaponized Hell" in Urban Allies edited by Joseph Nassise (July 2016, Harper Voyager, ISBN 978-0-06-239134-6)
- "Christmas Noun 9: The Nounchurian Candidate" (December 2016, on author website)
- "Episode 22" in Aliens: Bug Hunt edited by Jonathan Maberry (April 2017, Titan Books, ISBN 978-1-78565-444-2)
- "Musings of a Hermit" in Forged in Blood edited by Michael Z. Williamson (September 2017, Baen Books, ISBN 978-1-4814-8270-7)
- "Three Sparks" in Predator: If It Bleeds edited by Bryan Thomas Schmidt (October 2017, Titan Books, ISBN 978-1-78565-540-1)
- "Psych Eval" in Joe Ledger: Unstoppable edited by Jonathan Maberry and Bryan Thomas Schmidt (October 2017, St. Martin's Griffin, ISBN 978-1-250-09080-5)
- "Christmas Noun X: The Ghosts of Die Hards Past" (December 2017, on author website)
- "Proxy War" in Freehold: Resistance edited by Michael Z. Williamson (December 2019, Baen Books, ISBN 978-1-982124-23-6)
- "Mr. Positive, the Eternal Optimist" in Fantastic Hope edited by Laurell K. Hamilton and William McCaskey (April 2020, Berkley Books, ISBN 978-0-593-09920-9)
- "The Tuckerizing" in Give Me Libertycon edited by T. K. F. Weisskopf and Christopher Woods (June 2020, Baen Books, ISBN 978-1-982124-64-9)
- "Baizuo" in SPOTREPS edited by Peter Nealen (July 2020, ISBN 979-866551769-8)
- "The Dregs" in Songs of Valor edited by Robert Howell and Chris Kennedy (March 2021, New Mythology Press, ISBN 9781648551420)
- "David Webber War God Novella" (forthcoming, Baen Books)
- "Jim Butcher Novella" (forthcoming)
