= Brad R. Torgersen =

American science fiction author (born 1974)

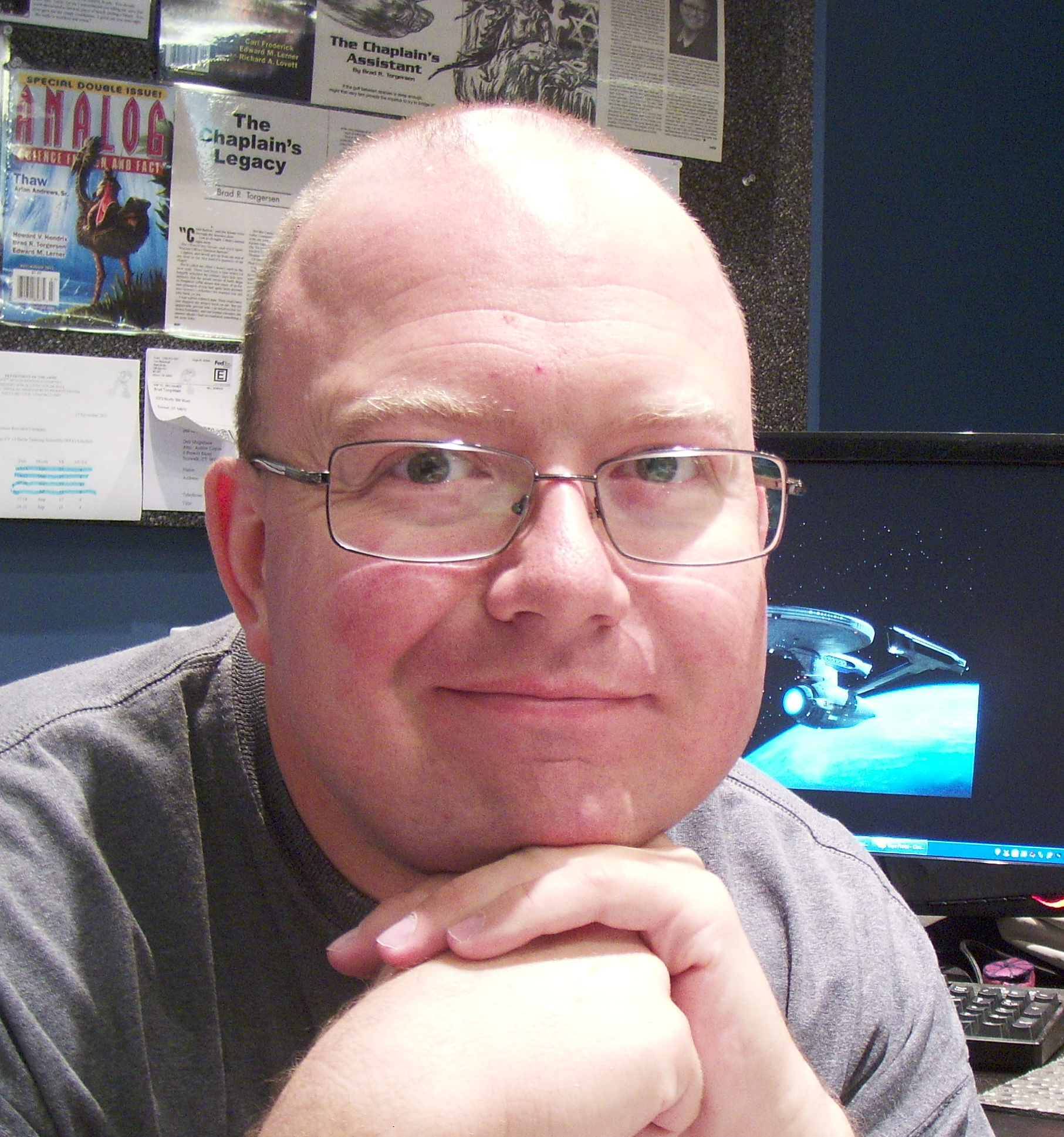
- Born: April 6, 1974 (age 52)
- Occupation: Author
- Writing career
- Period: 1992–present
- Genre: Science fiction
- Notable works: A Star-Wheeled Sky; "Ray of Light"; "The Exchange Officers"; "The Chaplain's Legacy"
- Notable awards: Analog Award (2010); Analog Award (2013); AML Award (2014); Analog Award (2014); Dragon Award (2019)
- Website: bradrtorgersen.com

Brad R. Torgersen (born April 6, 1974) is an American science fiction author whose short stories regularly appear in various anthologies and magazines, including Analog Science Fiction and Fact and Orson Scott Card's Intergalactic Medicine Show.

Torgersen's stories have won the Analog AnLab readers' choice award three different times, and he was a triple finalist in 2012 for the John W. Campbell Award for Best New Writer, the Hugo Award for best novelette, and the Nebula Award for best novelette. In addition to short fiction, Torgersen has two published novels, including the 2019 Dragon Award winner, A Star-Wheeled Sky. The Who's Who page for Analog magazine lists him as one of the "leading writers in the genre".

In 2015, Torgensen took charge of the Sad Puppies movement, an unsuccessful right wing anti-diversity attempt to win awards for a slate of nominees against perceived bias in the voting of the Hugo Awards. He was replaced the following campaign.

== Career ==
=== Writing ===
Torgersen was born April 6, 1974. His first public credit was as an unpaid script writer for locally-produced space opera serial Searcher & Stallion, which broadcast on Salt Lake City community radio KRCL FM in the early 1990s. "Footprints" was published in North Seattle Community College's 2002 Licton Springs Review.

In 2009, his story "Exanastasis" won third place in the third quarter Writers of the Future contest. Torgersen's first professional sale occurred shortly thereafter, when editor Stanley Schmidt bought Torgersen's novelette "Outbound" for Analog Science Fiction and Fact, and the story was selected in the Analog AnLab readers' poll for Best Novelette for 2010. His novelette "Ray of Light" was the cover story on the December 2011 issue of Analog and was nominated for both the Nebula Award and the Hugo Award. He was also nominated for the 2012 John W. Campbell Award for Best New Writer.

Torgersen received two nominations for the 2014 Hugo Awards: for the novella "The Chaplain's Legacy" and the novelette "The Exchange Officers". "The Chaplain's Legacy" also won the 2014 AML Award for Short Fiction. The Chaplain's War, published by Baen Books in October 2014, took his Analog stories "The Chaplain's Assistant" and the AnLab-winning "The Chaplain's Legacy" and expanded them into a fix-up novel. During the 2015 Hugo nomination and voting period, Torgersen led the Sad Puppies movement, which claimed that popular works were often unfairly passed over by Hugo voters in favor of more literary works, or stories with progressive political themes.

He won his third Analog AnLab readers' choice award for the novelette "Life Flight". In December 2018, Baen published A Star-Wheeled Sky, which won the 2019 Dragon Award for "Best Science Fiction Novel". In February 2020 Brad was the Literary Guest of Honor and Keynote Speaker at the 38th annual Life, the Universe, & Everything professional science fiction and fantasy arts symposium.

=== US Army Reserve ===
As of 2015 Torgersen was a chief warrant officer in the United States Army Reserve.

== Works ==
=== Series ===
==== The Chaplain's War ====
- The Chaplain's War (October 2014, Baen Books, ISBN 978-1-4767-3685-3), a fix-up novel incorporating these stories:
  - "The Chaplain's Assistant" in Analog Science Fiction and Fact edited by Stanley Schmidt (September 2011, Dell Magazines)
  - "The Chaplain's Legacy" in Analog Science Fiction and Fact edited by Trevor Quachri (July 2013, Dell Magazines)

==== The Nemesis ====
A serial space opera story on the Searcher & Stallion radio drama show on KRCL FM.

1. "The Beginning" (October 1992)
2. "The Preparation" (October 1992)
3. "Time for Action" (October 1992)
4. "A Trap is Sprung" (November 1992)
5. "Times of Conquest" (November 1992)
6. "Retaliate and Escape" (November 1992)
7. "The Price of Freedom" (December 1992)
8. "Fight or Flight" (December 1992)
9. "On the Move" (December 1992)
10. "Desperation" (December 1992)
11. "Return to Center" (January 1993)
12. "Battle to the Last" (January 1993)

==== Waywork Universe ====
- "Axabrast", short fiction published on the Baen Books website in November 2018
- A Star-Wheeled Sky (novel, December 2018, Baen Books, ISBN 978-1-4814-8362-9)

==== Zenophobia Saga ====
This series is written with Craig Martelle.

1. Heretic (December 2021, CMI, ISBN 978-1-953062-30-7)
2. Messenger (December 2021, CMI, ISBN 978-1-953062-31-4)
3. Extremist (January 2022, CMI, ISBN 978-1-953062-32-1)

=== Collections ===
- Lights in the Deep (August 2013, WordFire Press, ISBN 978-1-61475-074-1)
- Racers of the Night (August 2014, WordFire Press, ISBN 978-1-61475-232-5)

=== Anthologies ===
These are anthologies edited or co-edited by Torgersen.

- Red Tide co-authored with Larry Niven and Matthew J. Harrington (October 2014, Phoenix Pick, ISBN 978-1-61242-132-2)

=== Short stories ===
- "Footprints" in Licton Springs Review (Spring 2002)
- "Exanastasis" in L. Ron Hubbard Presents Writers of the Future, Volume XXVI edited by K. D. Wentworth (October 2010, Galaxy Press, ISBN 9781592128471)
- "Outbound" in Analog Science Fiction and Fact edited by Stanley Schmidt (November 2010, Dell Magazines)
- "Exiles of Eden" in Orson Scott Card's Intergalactic Medicine Show #22 edited by Edmund R. Schubert (April 2011)
- "The Bullfrog Radio Astronomy Project" in Analog Science Fiction and Fact edited by Stanley Schmidt (October 2011, Dell Magazines)
- "Ray of Light" in Analog Science Fiction and Fact edited by Stanley Schmidt (November 2011, Dell Magazines)
- "The Ascent" with Mike Resnick in Tales from the Fathomless Abyss edited by Philip Athans (December 2011, Athans & Associates Creative Consulting)
- "Sheep Dog" in The Gruff Variations: Writing for Charity Anthology, Vol. 1 edited by Eric James Stone (March 2012, Writing for Charity)
- "Guard Dog" with Mike Resnick in Space Battles edited by Bryan Thomas Schmidt (April 2012, Flying Pen Press, ISBN 978-0-9845927-5-3)
- "The Curse of Sally Tincakes" in Orson Scott Card's Intergalactic Medicine Show #28 edited by Edmund R. Schubert (May 2012)
- "Peacekeeper" with Mike Resnick in The Mammoth Book of SF Wars edited by Ian Watson and Ian Whates (May 2012, Robinson, ISBN 978-1-78033-040-2)
- "Strobe Effect" with Alastair Mayer in Analog Science Fiction and Fact (November 2012, Dell Magazines)
- "The Shadows of Titan" with Carter Reid in Space Eldritch edited by Nathan Shumate (December 2012, Cold Fusion Media, ISBN 978-1-4811-7831-0)
- "The Exchange Officers" in Analog Science Fiction and Fact edited by Stanley Schmidt (January 2013, Dell Magazines)
- "The Bricks of Eta Cassiopeiae" in Beyond the Sun edited by Bryan Thomas Schmidt (August 2013, Fairwood Press, ISBN 978-1-933846-38-5)
- "Gemini 17" in Lights in the Deep (August 2013, WordFire Press, ISBN 978-1-61475-074-1)
- "Guardian of the Headwaters" in The Crimson Pact: Volume 5 edited by Paul Genesse (August 2013, Iron Dragon Books, ISBN 978-0-9850038-4-5)
- "Reardon's Law" in Five by Five 2: No Surrender edited by Kevin J. Anderson (August 2013, WordFire Press, ISBN 978-1-61475-071-0)
- "The Hideki Line" in Spark: A Creative Anthology, Volume IV edited by Brian Lewis (January 2014, Empire & Great Jones Little Press, ISBN 978-0-9888072-9-7)
- "Picket Ship" in Baen Books: Free Stories 2014 (January 2014, Baen Books)
- "Life Flight" in Analog Science Fiction and Fact edited by Trevor Quachri (March 2014, Dell Magazines)
- "The Nechronomator" in Galaxy's Edge Issue 7 edited by Mike Resnick (March 2014, Arc Manor/Phoenix Pick, ISBN 978-1-61242-186-5)
- "Astronaut Nick" in A Fantastic Holiday Season: The Gift of Stories edited by Kevin J. Anderson and Keith J. Olexa (July 2014, WordFire Press, ISBN 978-1-61475-202-8)
- "Blood and Mirrors" in Racers of the Night: Science Fiction Stories edited by Brad R. Torgersen (August 2014, WordFire Press, ISBN 978-1-61475-232-5)
- "Peacekeeper" in Racers of the Night: Science Fiction Stories edited by Brad R. Torgersen (August 2014, WordFire Press, ISBN 978-1-61475-232-5)
- "Recapturing the Dream" in Racers of the Night: Science Fiction Stories edited by Brad R. Torgersen (August 2014, WordFire Press, ISBN 978-1-61475-232-5)
- "The Flamingo Girl" in Racers of the Night: Science Fiction Stories edited by Brad R. Torgersen (August 2014, WordFire Press, ISBN 978-1-61475-232-5)
- "The General's Guard" in Riding the Red Horse edited by Tom Kratman and Vox Day (December 2014, Castalia House)
- "Sparky the Dog" in Red Tide edited by Larry Niven, Brad R. Torgersen, and Matthew J. Harrington (October 2014, Phoenix Pick, ISBN 978-1-61242-132-2)
- "Gyre" in Galaxy's Edge Issue 13 edited by Mike Resnick (March 2015, Arc Manor/Phoenix Pick, ISBN 978-1-61242-260-2)
- "The Ghost Conductor of the Interstellar Express" in Trajectories: Stories of Exploration edited by Dave Creek (March 2016, Hydra Publications, ISBN 978-1-942212-36-2)
- "Jupiter or Bust" in Orson Scott Card's Intergalactic Medicine Show No. 50 edited by Edmund R. Schubert (April 2016, Hatrack River )
- "Spirits with Visions" in 2113: Stories Inspired by the Music of Rush edited by Kevin J. Anderson and John McFetridge (April 2016, ECW Press, ISBN 978-1-77041-292-7)
- "The Diddley Bow Horror" in Redneck Eldritch edited by Nathan Shumate (April 2016, Cold Fusion Media, ISBN 978-0-692-69291-2)
- "Mars Court Rules" in Galactic Games edited by Bryan Thomas Schmidt (June 2016, Baen Books, ISBN 978-1-4767-8158-7)
- "Purytans" in Analog Science Fiction and Fact edited by Trevor Quachri (July–August 2016, Dell Magazines)
- "CASPer's Ghost" in A Fistful of Credits edited by Chris Kennedy and Mark Wandrey (June 2017, Seventh Seal Press, ISBN 978-1-942936-70-1)
- "The Bride" in Monster Hunter Files edited by Larry Correia and Bryan Thomas Schmidt (October 2017, Baen Books, ISBN 978-1-4814-8275-2)
- "Hymns of the Mothers" in Forbidden Thoughts edited by Jason Rennie (January 2017, Superversive Press, ISBN 978-0-9945163-7-4)
- "The Unsent Letter" in Freedom's Light: Short Stories edited by Lindsay Galloway, Kia Heavey, and Matthew Souders (January 2017, Victory Fiction, ISBN 978-1-5204-0024-2)
- "Orphans of Aries" in Rocket's Red Glare edited by James Reasoner (May 2017, Rough Edges Press, ISBN 978-1-5466-7053-7)
- "45" in MAGA 2020 & Beyond edited by Marina Fontaine, Jason Rennie, and Dawn Witzke (November 2017, Superversive Press, ISBN 978-1-925645-48-4)
- "Old Dogs, New Tricks" in Avatar Dreams: Scientific Visions of Avatar Technology edited by Kevin J. Anderson and Mike Resnick (April 2018, WordFire Press, ISBN 978-1-61475-598-2)
- "For Man or Beast" in To Be Men: Stories Celebrating Masculinity edited by Sirius Métier (June 2018, Superversive Press, ISBN 978-1-925645-14-9)
- "Scrith" in Man-Kzin Wars XV (February 2019, Baen Books, ISBN 978-1-4814-8377-3)
- "Salvage: The Judas Gambit" in Salvage Conquest: Tales from the Salvage Title Universe edited by Chris Kennedy and Kevin Steverson (October 2019, Theogony Books, ISBN 978-1-950420-59-9)
- "Buffalo Fifteen " in Freehold: Resistance edited by Michael Z. Williamson (December 2019, Baen Books, ISBN 978-1-982124-23-6)
- "Secondhand Empires" in Trouble in the Wind edited by Chris Kennedy and James Young (December 2019, Theogony Books, ISBN 978-1-950420-75-9)
- "A Sword of Damocles" in Through the Gate: More Tales from the Salvage Title Universe edited by Chris Kennedy (June 2020, Theogony Books, ISBN 978-1-64855-036-2)
- "All Quiet on the Phantom Front" in Weird World War III edited by Sean Patrick Hazlett (October 2020, Baen Books, ISBN 978-1-982124-91-5)
- "Stowaway" in The Founder Effect edited by Robert E. Hampson and Sandra L. Medlock (December 2020, Baen Books, ISBN 978-1-982125-09-7)
- "Azchut" in The Expanding Universe: Volume 7 edited by Craig Martelle (September 2021, CMI, ISBN 978-1-953062-20-8)
- "The Eureka Alternative" in Weird World War IV edited by Sean Patrick Hazlett (March 2022, Baen Books, ISBN 978-1-982125-96-7)
- "The Pinocchio Gambit" in Robosoldiers: Thank You for Your Servos edited by Stephen Lawson (June 2022, Baen Books, ISBN 978-1-982191-90-0)

== Awards and recognition ==
Torgersen has been nominated for and won multiple awards for his various works. He is listed on Analog's Who's Who, a short listing of the "leading writers in the genre" who have been published in Analog.

Year	Organization	Award title, Category	Work	Result	Refs
2009	Writers of the Future	Third quarter	"Exanastasis"	3	
2010	Analog Science Fiction and Fact	Analog Award, Best Novelette	"Outbound"	Won	
2011	Analog Science Fiction and Fact	Analog Award, Best Novelette	"Ray of Light"	Nominated	
2012	Worldcon	Hugo Award, Best Novelette	"Ray of Light"	Nominated	
2012	Worldcon	John W. Campbell Award for Best New Writer	–	Nominated	
2012	SFWA	Nebula Award, Best Novelette	"Ray of Light"	Nominated	
2013	Analog Science Fiction and Fact	Analog Award, Best Novella	"The Chaplain's Legacy"	Won	
2013	Analog Science Fiction and Fact	Analog Award, Best Novelette	"The Exchange Officers"	Nominated	
2014	Worldcon	Hugo Award, Best Novelette	"The Exchange Officers"	Nominated	
2014	Worldcon	Hugo Award, Best Novella	"The Chaplain's Legacy"	Nominated	
2014	Analog Science Fiction and Fact	Analog Award, Best Novelette	"Life Flight"	Won	
2014	Association for Mormon Letters	AML Awards, Short Fiction	"The Chaplain's Legacy"	Won	
2019	Dragon Con	Dragon Award, Best Science Fiction Novel	A Star-Wheeled Sky	Won	
