= 2006 Origins Award winners =

The following are the winners of the 33rd annual Origins Award, held in 2007:

Category	Winner	Company	Designer(s)
Play By Mail Game of the Year	Starweb	Flying Buffalo	Rick Loomis
Board Game or Expansion of the Year	Treehouse	Looney Labs	Andrew Looney
Miniatures Game or Expansion of the Year	HORDES: Monstrous Miniatures Combat	Privateer Press	Matt Wilson
Miniature or Miniatures Line of the Year	Colossal Red Dragon	Wizards of the Coast	Andy Collins, Jesse Decker, David Noonan, Chris Perkins; Art Directed by Robert Raper
Non-Collectible Card Game or Expansion of the Year	Munchkin Impossible	Steve Jackson Games	Steve Jackson
Collectible Card Game or Expansion of the Year	Pirates: Davy Jones' Curse	WizKids	Mike Mulvihill
Game Accessory of the Year	Settlers of Catan Event Deck	Mayfair Games	Klaus Teuber
Fiction Publication of the Year	Dungeon Magazine	Paizo Publishing	Published by Erik Mona Edited by James Jacobs
Roleplaying Game of the Year	Burning Empires	Burning Wheel	Chris Moeller, Luke Crane, Thor Olavsrud, and Radek Drozdalski
Roleplaying Game Supplement of the Year	Deadlands Reloaded	Pinnacle/Great White Games	Shane Lacy Hensley and B D Flory
Historical Miniature Game of the Year	Vlad the Impaler	Warhammer Historical	John Bianchi, Steve Schifani, Dan Minculescu, and Rob Broom
Historical Miniatures Line of the Year	40mm American Civil War	Sash and Saber	Sculpted by Chris Hughes
Historical Board Game of the Year	Commands & Colors: Ancients	GMT Games	Richard Borg, Pat Kurivial, and Roy Grider
Origins Vanguard Awards	Larry Bond's Harpoon 3	Matrix Games	Advanced Gaming Systems
Origins Vanguard Awards	Pieces of Eight	Atlas Games	Jeff Tidball
