= The Witchfire Trilogy Book Two: Shadow of the Exile =

The Witchfire Trilogy Book Two: Shadow of the Exile is a 2001 role-playing game adventure published by Privateer Press.

== Plot summary ==
The Witchfire Trilogy Book Two: Shadow of the Exile is an adventure in which the player characters must try to stop the sorceress Alexia Ciannor.

== Publication history ==
Shannon Appelcline noted that "Privateer's first publications were a trilogy of adventures: The Longest Night (2001), Shadow of the Exile (2001), and The Legion of the Lost (2001) - which were collectively known as The Witchfire Trilogy. They were supplemented by the PDF-only adventure Fool's Errand (2001), which could be run between the first two books. Together these adventures helped Privateer Press to establish itself, based on two core strengths."

== Reviews ==
- Pyramid
- Backstab (as "L'Ombre de l'Exilé")
- Asgard (Issue 1 - Jul 2001)
- Gaming Frontiers (Volume 1 - 2002)
- Coleção Dragão Brasil
