= Mike McVey =

Miniatures sculptor and painter, and game designer

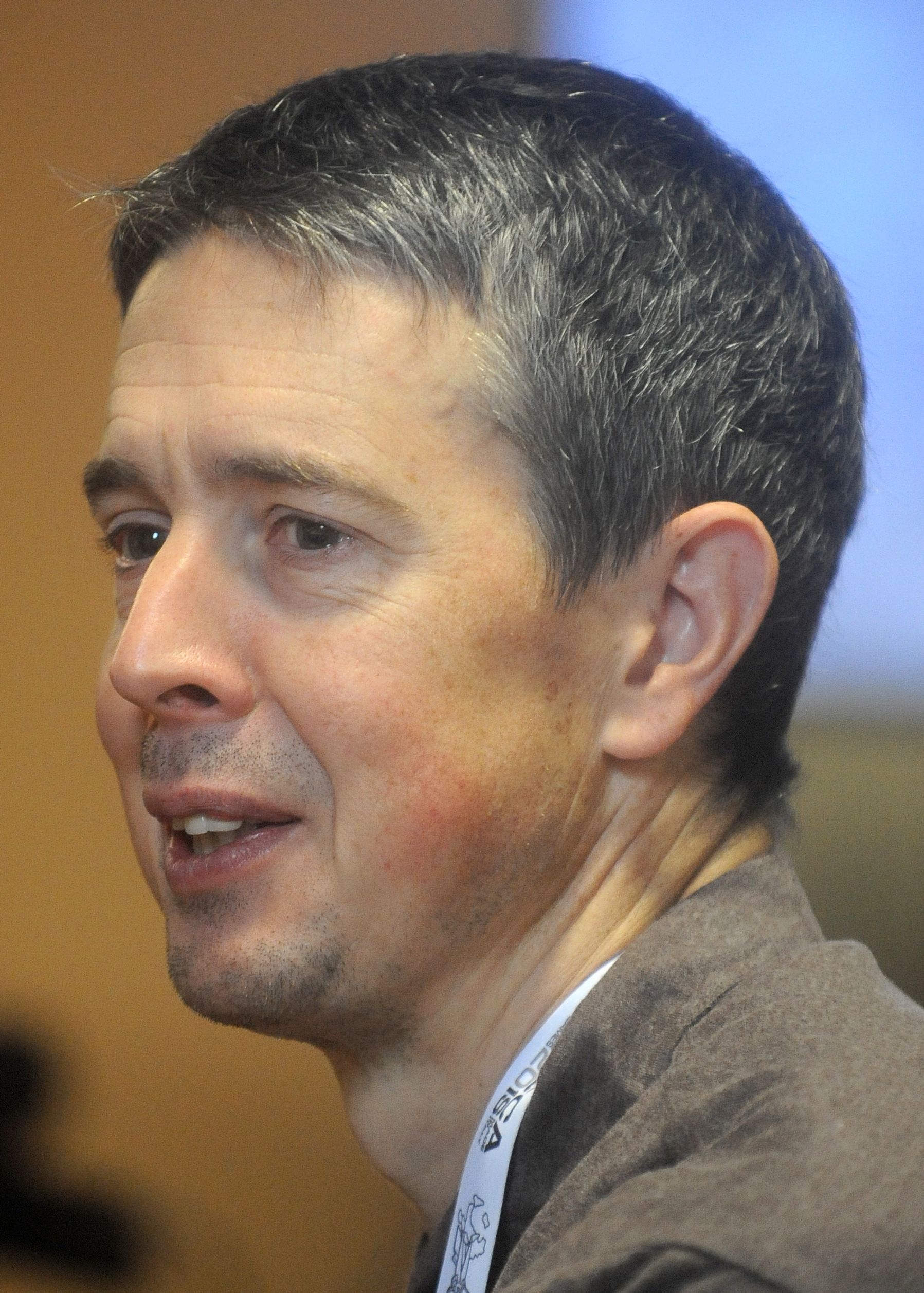
- At 2018 Lucca Comics & Games
- Born: United Kingdom
- Occupations: Game designer; Miniatures painter and sculptor

Michael McVey is an artist, miniatures sculptor and game designer who has worked primarily on miniature wargames.

== Early life ==
Mike McVey was born in the United Kingdom and played Dungeons & Dragons in his youth. While on a family holiday in the early 1980s, he painted his first miniature, a caveman produced by Ral Partha. He soon came to realize that he enjoyed painting the fantasy miniatures used in the game more than playing the game.

== Career ==
McVey started his career in the metal game miniatures industry in 1987 with Games Workshop (GW), where he worked as a miniatures painter at their Nottingham studio. From there, McVey filled many other roles for the company: writing a series of books for GW about painting and modelling; writing the 'eavy Metal column for GW's house magazine White Dwarf; making elaborate dioramas — he later called this "The happiest time in my whole career" — and designing several miniature ranges.

At the end of 1999, McVey moved to the United States and joined Wizards of the Coast (WotC) as Art Director of their miniature lines. His work included developing miniatures for WotC's new edition of Chainmail, as well as lines of D&D and Star Wars pre-painted miniatures. McVey used his "Role Models" column in WotC's house magazine Dragon to give advice on how to paint miniatures.

McVey then moved to Privateer Press in 2002 as a company partner, becoming their Miniatures Director. McVey immediately helped the company develop the steampunk miniatures board game Warmachine, which subsequently won the Portent Choice Award for "Best non-Games Workshop Wargame of 2003". The citation read in part, "After criticism for his Games Workshop sculpts, Mike McVey has had a point to prove and has done so brilliantly with his contribution to this brilliant thought-out and well supported wargame." Matt Williams of Privateer Press later commented that they had only been able to move Warmachine from an idea to reality after McVey joined their creative team, adding, "The biggest factor was finding Mike McVey. There's no way that Warmachine could be made without him. He's a brilliant sculptor who has the ability to do fantastic technical and straight line sculpting, perfectly suited for something like a steamjack."

In 2007, McVey moved back to the UK as a freelance consultant, which included work on World of Warcraft miniatures.

In 2009, McVey opened his own company, Studio McVey, and in 2012, started to work in partnership with the Chinese miniatures company CMON.

== Legacy ==
- Portal, a magazine focused on miniature and painting, did a profile of one of McVey's painting master classes and called him "the Godfather of Mini Painting".
- Adam Poots, designer of the boutique board game Kingdom Death, called McVey his "childhood hero".
- Neil Rutledge counselled young painters to start simple and not "be put off by the masterpieces of such gurus as Mike McVey".
- In 2017, Gen Con named McVey to their "Gen Con Industry Insider Alumni".
