= Iron Kingdoms Character Guide: Full Metal Fantasy, Volume 1 =

Iron Kingdoms Character Guide: Full Metal Fantasy, Volume 1 is a 2004 role-playing game supplement published by Privateer Press.

== Contents ==
Iron Kingdoms Character Guide: Full Metal Fantasy, Volume 1 is a supplement in which a steam‑and‑sorcery world of armored heroes, mechanika, diverse races, and lore is presented, offering new classes, feats, spells, gear, and cosmology for the Iron Kingdoms setting.

== Reviews ==
- Pyramid
- Backstab
- Fictional Reality (Issue 17 - Sep 2004)
- D20 Filtered (Issue 1 - Sep 2004)
