= Monsternomicon Volume I: Denizens of the Iron Kingdoms =

Monsternomicon Volume I: Denizens of the Iron Kingdoms is a 2002 supplement for d20 System role-playing games published by Privateer Press.

== Contents ==
Monsternomicon Volume I: Denizens of the Iron Kingdoms is a supplement in which an illustrated bestiary framed through Professor Pendrake's field notes, presents over eighty detailed creatures, new rules, classes, and campaign tools for the Iron Kingdoms.

== Reception ==
Monsternomicon Volume I: Denizens of the Iron Kingdoms won the 2003 Gold ENnie Awards for "Best Art, Cover", "Best Art, Interior", and "Best Graphic Design and Layout", and the 2003 Silver ENnie Award for "Best Monster Supplement".

== Reviews ==
- Pyramid
- Fictional Reality (Issue 10 - Dec 2002)
- Knights of the Dinner Table Magazine #74 (Dec., 2002)
- Campaign Magazine (Issue 7 - Feb/Mar 2003)
