= The Witchfire Trilogy Book Three: The Legion of Lost Souls =

The Witchfire Trilogy Book Three: The Legion of Lost Souls is a 2001 role-playing game adventure published by Privateer Press.

== Plot summary ==
The Witchfire Trilogy Book Three: The Legion of Lost Souls is an adventure in which ancient conspiracies result in war.

== Publication history ==
Shannon Appelcline noted that "Privateer's first publications were a trilogy of adventures: The Longest Night (2001), Shadow of the Exile (2001), and The Legion of the Lost (2001) - which were collectively known as The Witchfire Trilogy. They were supplemented by the PDF-only adventure Fool's Errand (2001), which could be run between the first two books. Together these adventures helped Privateer Press to establish itself, based on two core strengths."

== Reviews ==
- Pyramid
- Backstab (as "La Legion des Ames Perdues")
- Coleção Dragão Brasil (as "Legião das Almas Perdidas")
