= House of Assassins =

2019 fantasy novel by Larry Correia

- Author: Larry Correia
- Audio read by: Kurt Miller
- Language: English
- Series: Saga of the Forgotten Warrior
- Genre: Fantasy
- Published: February 5, 2019 (Baen)
- Publication place: United States
- Media type: Print, e-book, audio
- Pages: 408
- Awards: Dragon Award for Best Fantasy Novel (2019)
- ISBN: 978-1-4814-8376-6
- Preceded by: Son of the Black Sword
- Followed by: Destroyer of Worlds

House of Assassins is a 2019 epic fantasy novel by Larry Correia and published by Baen Books. It is the second book in the Saga of the Forgotten Warrior series and a sequel to Son of the Black Sword. It was followed by Destroyer of Worlds in 2020. It won Best Fantasy Novel at the 2019 Dragon Awards and was nominated for a 2019 Whitney Award.

== Reception ==
Publishers Weekly gave House of Assassins a starred review, stating that it had "brisk fight scenes, lively characters, and plenty of black humor" while calling the series "a real pleasure".

It won Best Fantasy Novel at the 2019 Dragon Awards, and was a finalist for the 2019 Whitney Awards in the speculative fiction category.
