= A Star-Wheeled Sky =

2018 science fiction novel by Brad R. Torgersen

- Author: Brad R. Torgersen
- Audio read by: Natasha Soudek
- Cover artist: Alan Pollack
- Language: English
- Genre: Science fiction
- Published: December 4, 2018 (Baen)
- Publication place: United States
- Media type: Print, e-book, audio
- Pages: 371
- Awards: Dragon Award for Best Science Fiction Novel (2019)
- ISBN: 978-1-4814-8362-9

A Star-Wheeled Sky is a 2018 science fiction novel by Brad R. Torgersen and published by Baen Books. It won Best Science Fiction Novel at the 2019 Dragon Awards and has received mixed-to-positive reviews.

== Plot ==
It has been thousands of years since humanity left a ruined Earth. Many of them settled within the Waywork, a system of about 50 star systems connected by a set of wormholes. The Waywork has been completely explored for hundreds of years, and the settled systems are bursting at the seams. One day, a new waypoint appears on the border between two warring factions. This causes a rush between the two to see who can lay claim to the new system and its resources.

== Reception ==
A Star-Wheeled Sky received mixed-to-positive reviews. Mike Lardas, of The Daily News called A Star-Wheeled Sky "marvelous sci-fi entertainment" and stated it "offer[ed] a fresh take on interstellar conflict". The Substrate Wars called it an "engaging, readable beginning to a series", full of "space battles, believable characters, [and] intriguing worldbuilding". On the other hand, Looking for a Good Book said that the military science fiction aspect "[shone] brightest here", but that the characters were only "okay" and that "it won’t likely excite too many readers".

A Star-Wheeled Sky won Best Science Fiction Novel at the 2019 Dragon Awards.
