= Son of the Black Sword =

2015 fantasy novel by Larry Correia

- Author: Larry Correia
- Audio read by: Kurt Miller
- Language: English
- Series: Saga of the Forgotten Warrior
- Genre: Fantasy
- Published: October 15, 2015 (Baen)
- Publication place: United States
- Media type: Print, e-book, audio
- Pages: 412
- Awards: Dragon Award for Best Fantasy Novel (2019)
- ISBN: 978-1-4767-8086-3
- Followed by: House of Assassins

Son of the Black Sword is a 2015 epic fantasy novel by Larry Correia and published by Baen Books. It is the first book in the Saga of the Forgotten Warrior series. It was followed by House of Assassins in 2019. It won Best Fantasy Novel at the 2016 Dragon Awards, was nominated for a 2015 AML Award and the 2016 Gemmell Legend Award. The novel also placed ninth in the 2016 Locus Award for Best Fantasy Novel readers' poll.

== Overview ==
The continent of Lok is surrounded by a demon-infested ocean. Its people are governed by The Law, a rigid social hierarchy and legal system which subdivides the population into four castes. The First Caste are rulers, judges and nobility, and control the Great Houses of Lok. These houses vie for power, at times raiding and warring with their neighbors. The Warrior Caste is employed by the nobility, and obsess over honors and duty. The Worker Caste includes traders, artisans, cooks, and many other professions. Lowest of the castes are the Casteless or Non-People, who are subject to inhumane living conditions and forced to undertake the least desirable tasks, such as cleaning stables and scrubbing floors.

The Great Houses are all subject to the rule of The Capitol, situated in the center of the continent and surrounded by desert. All religion is outlawed; "fanatics" and other law-breakers are hunted by The Inquisition, a silent and feared organization which routinely tortures its suspects. More respected are the Protectors, an order of highly skilled warriors with superhuman strength, perception, and healing ability. They are tasked with protecting Lok from demon incursions, as well as enforcing The Law.

Scattered around Lok are black-steel "ancestor blades". An ancestor blade imparts the martial prowess of all its previous bearers into the current owner. If touched by anyone else, the weapon may injure or kill them if it deems that person unworthy. Ashok Vadal, the novels' protagonist, is a Protector who wields such a weapon.

== Reception ==
Publishers Weekly gave Son of the Black Sword a starred review, stating that it was "full of action, intrigue, and wry humor", calling the characters "complex" and "sympathetic". Nick Sharps at Elitist Book Reviews gave the novel five stars, praising its main character and saying "Ashok is the sort of protagonist to do Conan proud", and that it would "earn Larry a lot of new fans from the fantasy genre".

It won Best Fantasy Novel at the 2016 Dragon Awards, was a finalist for the 2015 AML Awards in the novel category, and nominated for the 2016 Gemmell Legend Award. The novel placed ninth in the 2016 Locus Poll Award results for Best Fantasy Novel.
