= Sad Puppies =

Right-wing voting group in science-fiction awards

- Sad Puppies 3 "mission patch" design by Artraccoon
- Formation: 8 January 2013; 13 years ago
- Founder: Larry Correia
- Dissolved: 2017
- Type: Internet activism
- Purpose: Hugo Awards nominations
- Key people: Larry Correia, Brad R. Torgersen, Kate Paulk, Sarah Hoyt
- Formerly called: Sad Puppies Think of the Children Campaign

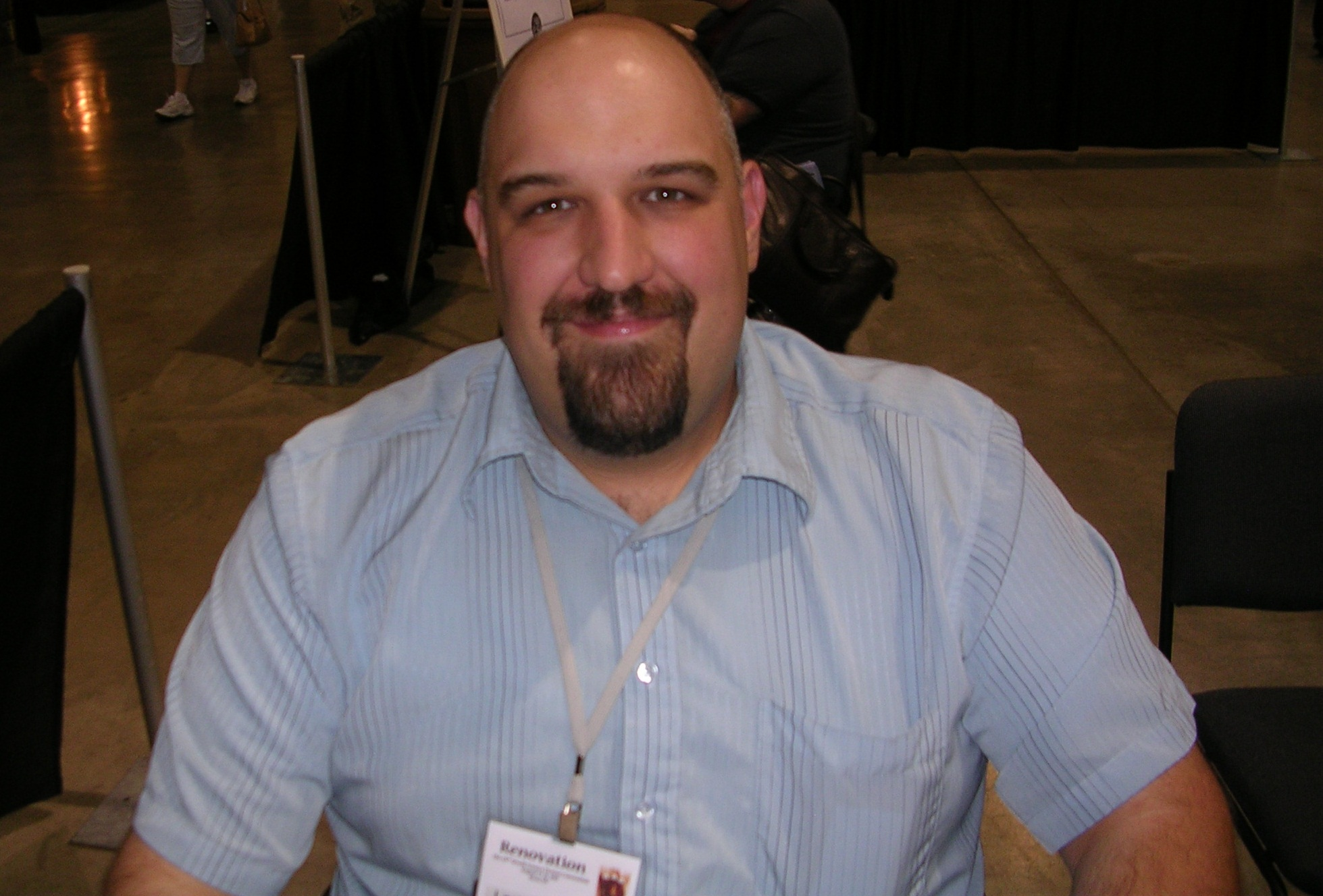
Larry Correia, founder of Sad Puppies

Sad Puppies was an unsuccessful right-wing anti-diversity campaign run from 2013 to 2017 and intended to influence the outcome of the annual Hugo Awards, the longest-running prize (since 1953) for science fiction or fantasy works. It was started in 2013 by author Larry Correia as a voting bloc to get his novel Monster Hunter Legion nominated for a Hugo Award, and then grew into suggested slates, or sets of works to nominate, in subsequent years (led by Correia in 2014, and then Brad R. Torgersen in 2015). According to the Los Angeles Times, Sad Puppies activists accused the Hugo Awards "of giving awards on the basis of political correctness and favoring authors and artists who aren't straight, white and male".

For the 2015 Hugos, the Sad Puppies slate and overlapping Rabid Puppies slate, run by Vox Day, swept several categories of nominations. During final voting at the Hugos, however, all except one of those categories was voted "No Award"; in that category, Best Film, the Puppies nominated already-popular films. In the following year, the Sad Puppies campaign was changed to instead report the results of a public survey, though the Rabid Puppy campaign did not follow suit. Only two categories were swept by the campaigns and subsequently voted for "No Award", and the only Puppy nominees to win categories were ones by popular creators unconnected to the campaigns, such as Neil Gaiman. The Sad Puppy campaign did not return in 2017, and the Rabid Puppy campaign only mustered an estimated 80–90 members and 12 nominations. That year, the nominating rules for the Hugos were changed to limit the power of bloc voting for small sets of works. Neither campaign was run in 2018 or has been run since.

== Award background ==
The World Science Fiction Society (WSFS) gives out the Hugo Awards each year for the best science fiction or fantasy works and achievements of the previous year. Works are eligible for an award if they were published in the prior calendar year, or translated into English in the prior calendar year. Hugo Award nominees and winners are chosen by supporting or attending members of the annual World Science Fiction Convention, or Worldcon, where the presentation of the awards takes place. The selection process is defined in the WSFS constitution as instant-runoff voting with five nominees per category, except in the case of a tie. The awards are split over more than a dozen categories, and include both written and dramatic works.

For each category of Hugo, the voter may rank "No Award" as one of their choices. Voters are instructed that they should do so if they feel that none of the nominees are worthy of the award, or if they feel the category should be abolished entirely. A vote for "No Award" other than as one's first choice signifies that the voter believes the nominees ranked higher than "No Award" are worthy of a Hugo in that category, while those ranked lower are not.

During the period the Sad Puppies campaign was active, the ballot consisted of five works for each category that were the most-nominated by members that year, with each member being able to nominate five works per category. Initial nominations were made by members in January through March, while voting on the ballot of five nominations was performed roughly in April through July, subject to change depending on when that year's Worldcon is held. Worldcons are generally held near the start of September, and take place in a different city around the world each year.

== History ==
=== 2013 campaign ===
Larry Correia started the first Sad Puppies campaign in 2013 when he mentioned on his blog that one of his works, Monster Hunter Legion, was eligible for that year's Hugo Award for Best Novel. The name for the campaign originates in an ASPCA ad featuring Sarah McLachlan, and a joke attributing puppy sadness to "boring message-fic winning awards". The first campaign focused mainly on nominating Monster Hunter Legion.

This first campaign failed: at 101 nominations, Monster Hunter Legion was 17 nominations short of the final ballot cutoff.

=== 2014 campaign ===
The second campaign started in January 2014, this time with twelve nominees listed across several categories. Seven of the twelve 2014 nominees made it to the final ballot, in seven categories, including Correia's Warbound.

One of the seven nominees—Toni Weisskopf for the Best Professional Editor (Long Form) category—finished above last place. Warbound ended in fifth (last) place. One of the nominees, short story "Opera Vita Aeterna", was ranked below "no award" for the category, therefore ranking sixth place out of five.

=== 2015 campaign ===
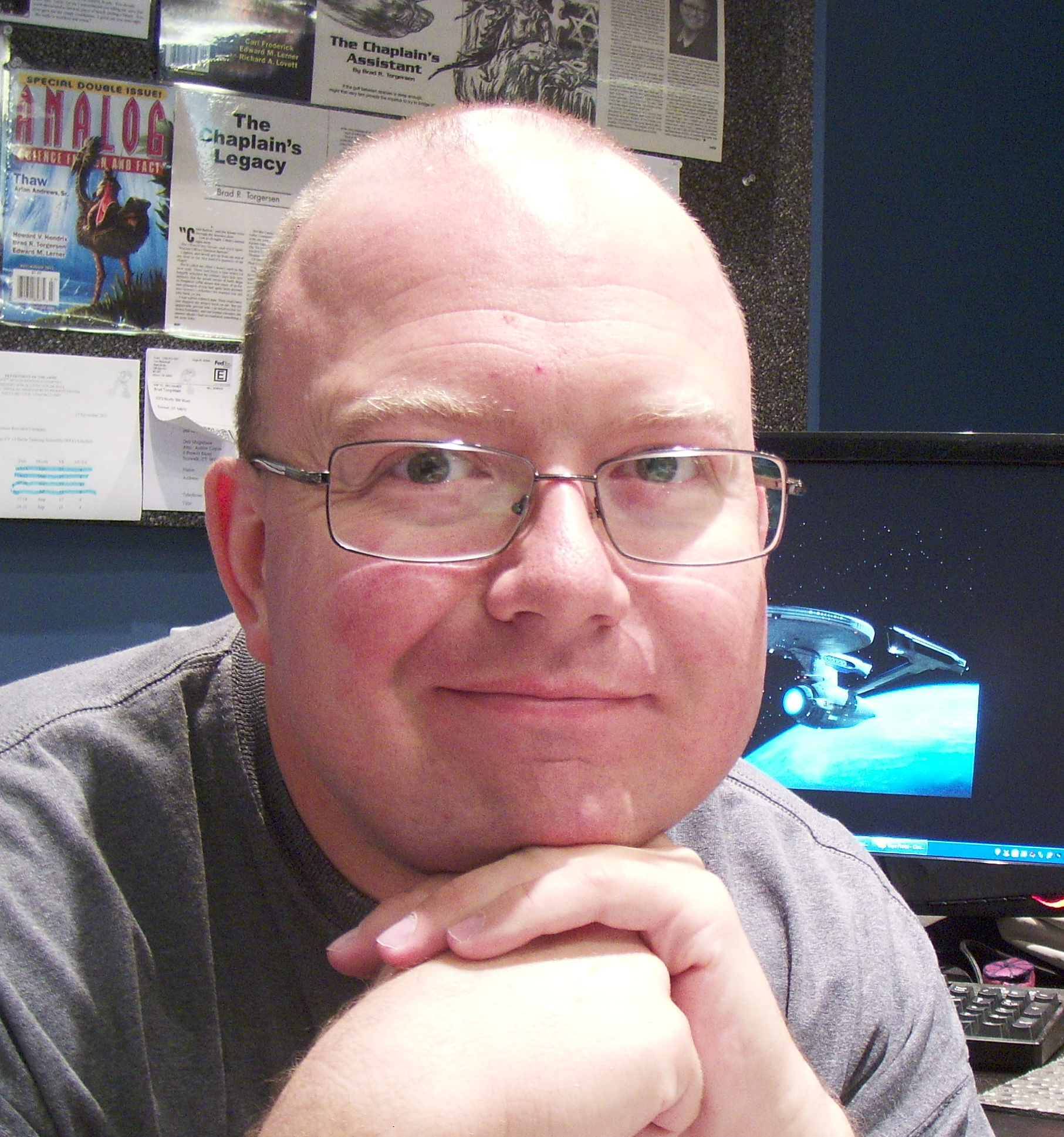
Brad R. Torgersen (pictured) led the 2015 campaign

Brad R. Torgersen took over the third campaign, announcing a slate on February 1, 2015. Torgersen argued that popular works were often unfairly passed over by Hugo voters in favor of more literary works, or stories with progressive political themes. The slate nominees were predominantly male but included female nominees and nominees of various racial backgrounds.

A second slate, the "Rabid Puppies", was announced a day later by writer and publisher Vox Day, who had written "Opera Vita Aeterna", taking most of the items from the Sad Puppies slate and adding additional works to form a similar but not completely overlapping slate. While the Sad Puppies slate was listed as "recommendations," Day explicitly instructed his followers to nominate the slate "precisely as they are."

Each put forward a similar voting bloc that came to dominate the ballot. The Rabid Puppies slate successfully placed 58 of its 67 candidates on the ballot. Two of the nominations were for Day himself, and eleven were for works published by his small Finnish publisher Castalia House, where Day acts as lead editor.

The campaigns triggered controversy among fans and authors, with at least six nominees declining their nomination both before and, for the first time, after the ballot was published. Many people advocated "no award" votes, and multiple-Hugo-winner Connie Willis declined to present the awards. Tor Books creative director Irene Gallo, on her personal Facebook page, described the Sad Puppies and Rabid Puppies as being "unrepentantly racist, misogynist, and homophobic" and "extreme right-wing to neo-Nazi (...) respectively". though she clarified that this was not the official position of Tor Books.

Various media outlets reported the two campaigns as stating they were a reaction to "niche, academic, overtly [leftist]" nominees and winners in opposition to "an affirmative action award" that preferred female and non-white authors and characters. The slates were characterized as a "right wing", "orchestrated backlash" by a "group of white guys" and links and parallels were identified with the Gamergate controversy. George R.R. Martin called the controversy "Puppygate". The Rabid Puppies faction has been described as members of or sympathetic to the alt-right political movement.

In all, 51 of the 60 Sad Puppy recommendations and 58 of the 67 Rabid Puppy recommendations made the final ballot. In five categories, "Best Related Work", "Best Short Story", "Best Novella", "Best Editor (Short Form)", and "Best Editor (Long Form)", the nominations were composed entirely of Puppy nominees.

The only winning work to appear on a Puppy slate was the film Guardians of the Galaxy, which won "Best Dramatic Presentation, Long Form." In every Puppy-only category, "No Award" was ranked above all nominees, so no Hugo was awarded. In the remaining categories with Puppy nominees ("Best Fan Writer", "Best Fancast", "Best Fanzine", "Best Semiprozine", "Best Professional Artist", "Best Graphic Story", "Best Novelette", and "Best Novel"), all Puppy nominees were ranked below No Award; this was also the case for the John W. Campbell Award for Best New Writer.

=== 2016 campaign ===
On September 3, 2015, author Kate Paulk announced that she would be organizing the fourth Sad Puppies campaign. Rather than write a list of her own recommendations, Paulk created online forum threads where anyone could recommend any number of works, from which she would identify the "ten or so" most recommended works in each category. Her stated reason for this methodology was that it would be more reflective of the opinions of millions of fans of eligible works than that of the five thousand or fewer Hugo voters. Paulk published the results on March 17, 2016. On March 25, Vox Day released a Rabid Puppies list similar in format to his previous ones.

Again, some of the authors of nominees on the two lists requested to be removed, such as Alastair Reynolds for his novella Slow Bullets. However, neither list honored any requests for removal. Catherynne M. Valente, whose novella Speak Easy appeared on the Sad Puppies list, initially expressed dismay to have been included without being asked permission, but later acknowledged that the organizers had apparently taken the previous year's criticisms to heart and created a recommendation list of a type that would not normally be expected to seek permission from included artists.

The nominees were announced in April 2016, with many nominees from the two groups appearing on the list. 64 of the 81 Rabid Puppy nominations appeared on the final list. John Scalzi stated in a piece for the Los Angeles Times that the change in process for the Sad Puppy 4 list, as well as the larger overlap in both lists with more generally popular works, meant that many of the works on the final ballot such as those by prior winners Neil Gaiman and Neal Stephenson were unlikely to owe much of their success at the nomination stage to their presence on the Puppy lists.

For the final Hugo ballot, three of the Best Novel finalists were mentioned on the Sad Puppies' recommendations lists, all five of the Best Novella finalists were mentioned, as well as three of the Best Novelette finalists, three of the Best Short Story finalists, two of the names up for Best Fan Writer, and four of the Best Long Form Dramatic Presentation.

In the final vote, items on the longer Sad Puppies recommendation list won in the fiction categories of Best Novella (Nnedi Okorafor), Best Novelette (Hao Jingfang) and Best Short Story (Naomi Kritzer). Items on the Rabid Puppies' slate won only in the Best Novelette category. The Guardian described the results of the final voting as a defeat for the Rabid and Sad Puppies; in two categories, the results were "No Award"—Best Fancast and Best Related Work—while the remaining winners were either assumed not to be on the Puppies' recommendations lists or, like Gaiman, were largely seen as unconnected to the groups.

=== 2017 campaign ===
Two changes in the Hugo award nomination process to reduce the power of slate voting, first proposed in 2015, went into effect starting with the 2017 awards.

For the 2017 Hugo awards, in January 2017 author Amanda S. Green announced on a shared blog run by Torgerson, Paulk, and others associated with the campaign that author Sarah A. Hoyt would run the Sad Puppies 5 campaign, and that same day announced on the Sad Puppies 4 website that a website and recommendation list for Sad Puppies 5 would be forthcoming. No such campaign was ever created. A Rabid Puppies list for the year was created by Vox Day containing 22 items across the categories, 11 of which ended up on the shortlists; a further 5 received enough nominations, but were disqualified as ineligible. Several categories contained no Puppy nominees, including Best Novel, and none had more than a single nomination. None of the slate items won. An analysis by Mike Glyer of File770 estimated that the number of Rabid Puppy slate voters was around 80–90. No Sad Puppy or Rabid Puppy campaigns have been run since.
