= Lock & Load: Iron Kingdoms Character Primer =

Lock & Load: Iron Kingdoms Character Primer is a 2002 role-playing game supplement published by Privateer Press for Iron Kingdoms.

== Contents ==
Lock & Load: Iron Kingdoms Character Primer is a supplement in which a character‑creation guide for the steam‑powered Iron Kingdoms offers new races, classes, equipment, lore, and a full‑color map.

== Reviews ==
- Pyramid
- Fictional Reality (Issue 11 - Mar 2003)
- d20Zine #4 (March, 2003)
- Knights of the Dinner Table Magazine #76 (Feb., 2003)
- Legions Realm Monthly (Issue 8 - Apr 2003)
