= KRCL =

Radio station in Salt Lake City

- Salt Lake City, Utah; United States
- Broadcast area: Salt Lake City metropolitan area
- Frequency: 90.9 MHz (HD Radio)
- Branding: 90.9 KRCL

Programming
- Format: Community radio
- Affiliations: Pacifica radio

Ownership
- Owner: Listeners Community Radio of Utah

History
- First air date: December 3, 1979
- Call sign meaning: "LCR" backward

Technical information
- Licensing authority: FCC
- Facility ID: 37766
- Class: C
- ERP: 25,000 watts
- HAAT: 1,140 meters (3,740 ft)
- Transmitter coordinates: 40°39′34″N 112°12′5″W
- Translators: 90.9 KRCL-FM1 (Park City); 96.7 K244EN (Park City)

Links
- Public license information: Public file; LMS
- Webcast: Listen live
- Website: krcl.org

KRCL (90.9 FM) is a listener-supported community radio station in Salt Lake City, Utah.

KRCL is a non-profit organization that airs music and public affairs programming. Music programs are hosted by DJs who choose their own playlist. Many programs feature alternative, indie rock, folk, blues, and world music. Public affairs programming includes locally generated content, as well as nationally syndicated programs such as Pacifica Radio's Democracy Now!

The station began broadcasting in 1979 and was the first station of its kind in the Salt Lake City area.

== History ==
KRCL was conceived in part by Stephen Holbrook, a community activist and member of the Utah State Legislature. Holbrook was concerned that the media in Salt Lake were not adequately serving minority points of view and communities, particularly after a 1965 dispute with radio station KSL. While visiting California, Holbrook was exposed to KPFA, the Pacifica Foundation radio station in Berkeley. He endeavored to start a similarly oriented station in Utah. In 1975, Listeners Community Radio of Utah was formed, bringing together smaller groups that were interested in radio but did not have the resources to pursue their own station.

While it began to air occasional programs on public radio station KUER-FM, Listeners also applied for a license to build its own station on June 27, 1976. One legacy of the dispute with KSL was that its owner, Bonneville International, donated space on the Farnsworth Peak tower used by KSL's FM radio and television stations as well as other equipment; this allowed Holbrook to ensure regional coverage, as he felt it was essential the new outlet be a "Wasatch Front station" rather than a low-wattage, limited-range facility. The Federal Communications Commission (FCC) granted a construction permit on April 11, 1978, and plans were initially announced to locate the studios at Westminster College. The college, however, dropped out because of entreaties by utility company Mountain Fuel Supply, which objected to Holbrook's legislative work relating to utilities. The antenna on Farnsworth Peak was erected before the winter of 1978–1979, sitting unused for more than a year.

KRCL began broadcasting on December 3, 1979, from a facility above the Blue Mouse bar downtown and after a $95,000 investment, which included grant money which Robert Redford had helped secure from the Community Services Administration. It initially broadcast for 11 hours on weekdays and longer on weekends. Primarily based on a block programming format where volunteers often played albums from their own record collections on the air, the station also featured specialist programming, including shows for gays and lesbians, Native Americans, Tongan Americans. In the early years, it was nicknamed "Radio Free Utah" and "Lion of Zion". It moved from its original studios to a site at 200 West and 900 North in 1982. Over the course of its history, the emphasis on representing minority communities lessened, particularly with the Hispanic community, as Spanish-language radio came to Utah.

It operated generally on a shoestring, with four full-time paid staffers in 1984 and five in 1999. However, in 2000, it was able to move to its own building at 1973 West North Temple after a multiyear capital campaign. The station remained on North Temple until 2021, when it sold the property to a developer seeking to build low-income housing and moved to a new temporary facility.

In 2008, KRCL replaced its 18 volunteer on-air hosts with three paid DJs in a bid to make its music programming more consistent and encourage listeners who were younger and listened for longer. The suggestion had been made in connection with a "station renewal" grant by the Corporation for Public Broadcasting—which supplied 12 percent of its budget and negotiated its music licensing royalties—as a way to possibly reverse a decline in listenership. The changes were successful in increasing the station's listener base but simultaneously alienated many dismissed DJs, some of whom moved to online stations; news of the shuffle led to protests at the Salt Lake City library. Further, fundraising dropped from 2007 to 2009.

More controversy erupted in 2017 when KRCL's afternoon drive host, "Bad" Brad Wheeler, announced his resignation on air, which led to criticism of general manager Vicki Mann and ultimately to her resignation. She was replaced by Tristin Tabish, a former station employee who had been a listener since growing up in Magna, 20 miles (32 km) from Salt Lake, in the 1980s.

== Translator ==
In addition to the main station, KRCL is relayed by an additional booster and translator to serve Park City, which is blocked from Salt Lake radio signals by terrain.

Call sign	Frequency	City of license	FID	ERP (W)	Class	FCC info
KRCL-FM1	90.9 FM	Park City, Utah	165237	99	D	LMS
K244EN	96.7 FM	Park City, Utah	37764	99	D	LMS

From 2007 to 2011, KZCL (90.5 FM) in Logan operated as a higher-power repeater of KRCL for northern Utah. The facility, which had been planned for more than a decade, struggled from engineering issues and the ability to receive a reliable signal of KRCL. It was sold to the University of Utah in 2011 and became KUEU, rebroadcasting KUER-FM; one local booster of the rebroadcast effort apologized in a letter to the editor for representing KRCL.

== See also ==
- List of community radio stations in the United States
