= The Book of the Righteous =

The Book of the Righteous is a 2002 supplement for d20 System role-playing games published by Green Ronin Publishing.

== Contents ==
The Book of the Righteous is a supplement in which the holy warrior class is presented and supported with a detailed pantheon of more than twenty churches, complete with orders, cults, mythology, and numerous feats, spells, and prestige options to bring living religion into a campaign.

== Reception ==
The Book of the Righteous won the 2003 Silver ENnie Award for "Best Setting Supplement".

== Reviews ==
- Pyramid
- Asgard #7 (Sept., 2002)
- Fictional Reality (Issue 10 - Dec 2002)
- The Way, The Truth & The Dice (Vol 4 - Summer 2007)
