= Iron Kingdoms =

Tabletop fantasy role-playing game

- Publishers: Privateer Press
- Publication: 2004; 22 years ago
- Genres: fantasy, steampunk
- Systems: d20 System, custom

Iron Kingdoms is a fantasy role-playing game, originally published by Privateer Press on July 1, 2004, for the d20 System, with several supplemental books released in following years. In 2012, Iron Kingdoms was newly released under a unique d6 rules system closely based on the rules for the miniature war games Warmachine and Hordes from which the Iron Kingdoms RPG is derived. The setting combines high fantasy and steampunk genres into what Privateer Press describes as "Full Metal Fantasy". In 2025, Privateer Press successfully kickstarted a new version based on Dungeons & Dragons fifth edition.

== Publication history ==
The steampunk Iron Kingdoms setting was first seen in the initial publications by Privateer Press, an adventure trilogy consisting of The Longest Night (2001), Shadow of the Exile (2001) and The Legion of the Lost (2001), which was supplemented by the concurrent adventure Fool's Errand (2001) published only in PDF. These adventures won the first awards for Privateer Press, including ENnies for "Best World" and "Best Art". Privateer Press published two more Iron Kingdoms books the next year, the character primer Lock & Load (2002) and monster book The Monsternomicon (2002), and also stated they would publish a full Iron Kingdoms campaign setting book. After its first five role-playing game publications, Privateer Press next released the miniatures combat game Warmachine: Prime (2003), which was also set in the Iron Kingdoms. Privateer Press finally released the Iron Kingdoms campaign setting book in two parts as Full Metal Fantasy volume 1 (2004) and volume 2 (2005), using the OGL instead of the d20 licence that Privateer had used to publish its earlier RPG materials. The Iron Kingdoms world received additional development for its mechanical entities in Liber Mechanika (2005), its setting in Five Fingers: Port of Deceit (2006), and more of its monsters in Monsternomicon Volume II (2007). Privateer Press published the No Quarter magazine to provide support for the role playing and miniatures aspects of the Iron Kingdoms, but later focused more on the miniatures and fiction for Iron Kingdoms.

== Setting ==
Having overcome insurmountable odds and writing history in blood red ink, penned with steel, The Iron Kingdoms stand strong against all opposition. The Iron Kingdoms lie on the continent of Immoren consists of the following Kingdoms: Cygnar, Khador, Llael and Ord. Rhul is the dwarven kingdom, and Ios is the elven. The trollkin inhabit the Wild area outside of the Kingdom walls in the Thornwood, and care little for the technology of the new world.

The Continent of Immoren lies in the world known as Caen. Western Immoren is the home of the Iron Kingdoms and the other races. At a time known as the Rivening to the elven kind, the whole of eastern Immoren was desolated by great changes in climate, and what was once a small desert had erupted into a vast wasteland known as the Bloodstone Marches.

=== Races of Caen ===
==== Humans ====
The Iron Kingdoms is a Human-dominated campaign setting. Though fantasy standards such as Dwarves and Elves exist, the vast majority of the setting is populated by and run by Humans. This is mostly due to the Gift of Magic, a Gift claimed as one given by the deity Thamar. The elves relate this event of magic birth among humans to the dying of their last goddess. The exact correlation or source of the Gift of Magic is unknown, as its study is still in the infant stages.

===== Khador =====
Hailing from the central and western areas of Khador, the Khardic people are the most numerous in the Empire. The ancient Khardic Empire took its name from them, and they exhibit a nationalist pride in the old culture. They tend to be dark of hair, rough of features and larger than most ethnic groups in Western Immoren, and are known for their ability to endure hardship. Many claim that Khardic size is due to descent from the Bogatyri, a race of mythic giants that were supposedly wiped out during the Orgoth Invasion.

Culturally, Khards tend to be jingoistic, a fact seized upon by Khador in motivating the country to war. They are also known for their fiery tempers, fierce pride, and unbending tenacity. Due to these traits, Khards are known for the powerful warriors that come from their people, a martial tradition that continues to form the basis of Khadoran society.

Most Khards speak Khadoran.

===== Cygnar =====
Cygnar is described as the most technologically advanced human kingdom in the setting, with an emphasis on knowledge, education, and reason. Although less populous than Khador, it includes Caspia, known as the City of Walls, and is noted for its military expertise and mechanical technology, particularly steamjacks.

Being a melting pot of races and cultures, Cygnar has developed a very tolerating community, although some interracial tension still persists.

Most Cygnarans speak Cygnaran.

===== The Protectorate of Menoth =====
The Protectorate of Menoth is a religious nation, located on the eastern border of Cygnar, tyrannically dominated by the clergy of the god Menoth, also known as the Lawgiver and the God of Man. Though technically a part of the kingdom itself, The Protectorate has claimed sovereignty and are a separate entity from Cygnar. Although the language spoken differs in dialect, it is still generally the same language as Cygnaran.

===== Others =====
Other northern human groups include Kossite, Ryn, Skirov, and Umbrean. Central kingdom groups include Midlunder, Morridane, Thurian and Tordoran. Southern kingdom groups include Caspian/Sulese, Idrian and Scharde.

==== Dwarves ====
Dwarves are more populous, prosperous, and pervasive than Elves in the Iron Kingdoms. They primarily live in the mountain nation of Rhul, to the north and east of the human nations. Rhul is not one of the Iron Kingdoms, but plays an important role in the politics and trade of the region. Dwarves in the Iron Kingdoms are still as strong and stout as their D&D counterparts, but while they are still considered to be master miners and metal-smiths, they are also considered to be one of the setting's premier authorities in the craft of gun-making.

==== Gobbers ====
Gobbers are a more civilized version of traditional D&D goblins. Gobbers fill game niches traditionally filled by gnomes and halflings, which are not present in this setting. They make for capable mechanics and alchemists.

=== Elves ===
==== Iosan ====
The elves of Caen inhabit the nation of Ios. Ios is located east of Llael. In addition to complete militaristic, political, and trade isolationism, the Elves of Ios also harbor severe xenophobia. Paranoid and agitated by the outside world, they have secluded themselves to their kingdom for several centuries. In the recent times, with the Iron Kingdoms beset by rampant warfare, Elven activity has been on the rise. Usually spotted in unconfirmed scouting or spying activity, the Elves have most certainly taken notice and interest in the woes of the Iron Kingdoms.

==== Nyss ====
The Nyss were once among their Iosan cousins as one kind. Centuries ago, the Nyss began a spiritual exodus to the icy mountains north, considering themselves the chosen people of the god Nyssor. Although it is mostly speculated, it is possible that the Nyss believed the downfall of their Iosan cousins is due to the hyper-advancement of their kind, and the abandonment of the old tribal/nomadic ways. Almost physically identical, but separated widely by culture, the Nyss cultivate a hunter/gatherer society in the extreme north that has flourished in the past couple centuries. Unlike their bretheren, over time, the Nyss peoples' skin has evolved to parallel their new frozen settlement. This adaptation has made it quite easy to differentiate between an Iosan and Nyss elf.

===== The Coming of Everblight =====
The Nyss are now in the hardest time of their history. Awakened from the frigid mountain tops, the dragon-spirit Everblight has begun his wave of conquest, destruction, and corruption. In addition to the creation of the dragon-spawn, the first objective of Everblight was the mass corruption (blighting) of the Nyss. An unmitigated success, this windfall for Everblight has decimated the Nyss population and sent the few survivors clamoring south into Khadoran towns speaking of a nameless horror, often only to be killed by their ancient human enemies. Now, hardened by life in the north, and strengthened by Everblight's touch, the Nyss stand at the vanguard of a new and hideous wave of death.

==== Ogrun ====
Ogrun are a more civilized version of traditional D&D ogres. While barbaric ogrun do exist in the Iron Kingdoms, many have found a home living among the dwarves in the kingdom of Rhul. Ogrun are the only playable race in the Iron Kingdoms with no aptitude for arcane magic.

==== Trollkin ====
Distant relatives of the more powerful trolls, trollkin, like ogrun and gobbers, can be found in human cities, often working as dockworkers or stonemasons. However, there is still a large trollkin population that chooses to live a simpler life in the wilderness of Immoren. These trollkin live in a "kriel" (a group of families living closely together) and usually form tribes. Such tribes are usually led by a group known as the "circle of stones," made up of the eldest and wisest of the tribe. A tribe also has a shaman or priest who serves as the arbiter of all spiritual matters, although Shamans are also highly sought after to provide wisdom in more worldly matters. Trollkin sorcerers are born albino. Trollkin living in the wilds usually worship either the goddess Dhunia or the Devourer Worm.

==== Dragons ====
Thought to be the embodiment of the Devourer Wurm, dragons are malicious demigods that bring nothing but desolation and waste wherever they roam. Toruk, the progenitor of his species, was named the Dragonfather. Though the source or birth of this dragon is unknown, his power comes from a stone known as an athanc. This stone, virtually indestructible, will revive him regardless of what happens to his body. In the event of absolute annihilation of every fiber of his being, the athanc will revive him. They also radiate a mutagenic effect known as the Blight that gradually transforms the creatures and world around them into their servants, although only Everblight, one of the most cunning and intelligent dragons, has truly gained conscious control of his.

This said, Toruk was, at the time, the only of his kind. Desiring company or perhaps lieutenants, he split off pieces of his own athanc to form others, and in doing so gave rise to his sons. Dragons—being as proud, stubborn, and unruly as their creator—are not content to be ruled, even by their own father. This led the sons to rebel against their father. Despite his power, Toruk was still vastly outnumbered, but managed to scatter his kin to the winds. The sons took to the sky, and hid themselves across Immoren.

These dragons cannot die, and are not alive by any normal expression or understanding of the word. Hence, any attempt by the Human, Iosan, or any other race to destroy a dragon has met with failure—and a great loss of numbers among that race. Toruk, the Dragonfather, is the only one capable of reclaiming his sons' souls. This is done by him ingesting the athanc of the dragon-son. The closest mortals have ever come is entombing the athanc of Everblight in the far north, but even then his Blight remains active and he controls an army from within his prison.

== System ==
In 2021, Privateer Press released an updated version of the setting for Dungeons & Dragons 5th edition.

== Reception ==
Shannon Appelcline calls The Iron Kingdoms "a unique and innovative background [...] a 'steampunk' setting, mixing dark fantasy with steam-based technology and gun powder. It was original, innovative and unlike anything else on the market" at the time. The initial adventures published in the setting won Ennies for "Best World" and "Best Art".

The new edition of Iron Kingdoms received gold ENnie Awards in 2013 for Best Game and Best Cover Art, and silver ENnies for Best Rules and Best Production Values.

== Reviews ==
- Casus Belli (v4, Issue 16 - Sep/Oct 2015)

== Books ==
All books from Privateer Press through its Skull Island eXpeditions imprint unless otherwise indicated.

Exiles in Arms:

1. Moving Targets by C. L. Werner (April 2013, 978-1-939480-01-9, ebook)
2. Night of the Necrotech by C. L. Werner (November 2013, 978-1-939480-01-9 (ebook))

The Fall of Llael:

1. In Thunder Forged by Ari Marmell (June 2013, 978-1-61614-773-0 (trade paperback), 978-1-61614-774-7 (ebook))
2. Big Iron by C. A. Suleiman (July 2013, 978-1-61614-775-4 (trade paperback))

Tales from the Monsternomicon:

1. Extraordinary Zoology by Howard Tayler (July 2013, 978-1-939480-31-6 (ebooks))

The Malcontents:

1. Into the Storm by Larry Correia (August 2013, 978-1-943693-11-5 (trade paperback))
2. Into the Wild by Larry Correia (April 2016, 978-1-943693-11-5 (trade paperback))

=== Anthologies ===
Called to Battle: Volume One:

1. Volume One (September 2013, 978-1-939480-43-9 (ebook))
2. "Heartfire" by Howard Tayler, "Destiny of a Bullet" by Larry Correia, "Judgment" by Erik Scott de Bie, and "Under the Shadow" by Orrin Grey
3. Volume Two (December 2014, 978-1-939480-80-4 (ebook))
4. "Mind Over Matter" by Howard Tayler, "A Casualty of Science" by Matt Forbeck, "Conviction" by Steve Diamond, and "Flesh and Bone" by Chris A. Jackson

The No Quarter Collection:

1. Volume One (December 2013, 978-1-939480-51-4 (ebook))
  - "Better Left Forgotten" by Douglas Seacat, *"Dead Stop" by Aeryn Rudel, *"Inner Sanctum" by William Shick, *"Prey" by Aeryn Rudel, *"The Shae Mutiny" by Douglas Seacat, and *"The Better Part of Valor" by Douglas Seacat
2. Volume Two (May 2015, 978-1-939480-94-1 (ebook))
  - "Conversion" by William Shick, *"Patriot's Crucible" by Aeryn Rudel, *"Not Everyone Dies" by Douglas Seacat, *"Warrior's Telos" by William Shick, *"Swamped" by Aeryn Rudel, and *"The King's Own" by Douglas Seacat

Iron Kingdoms Excursions, Season One:

1. Volume One (February 2014, 978-1-939480-59-0 (ebook))
  - "Gentleman's Game" by William Shick, "Straight Shooter" by Aeryn Rudel, and "Answering the Call" by Douglas Seacat
2. Volume Two (March 2014, 978-1-939480-62-0 (ebook))
  - "Scrap Ante" by Howard Tayler, "The Last Hunt" by William Shick, and "The Worthy" by Larry Correia
3. Volume Three (April 2014, 978-1-939480-64-4 (ebook))
  - "Weapons of the Enemy" by Orrin Grey, "Tongue-Tied" by Aeryn Rudel, and "Mouths to Feed" by Howard Tayler
4. Volume Four (May 2014, 978-1-939480-65-1 (ebook))
  - "Step Outside" by Larry Correia, "Replacement Parts" by Darla Kennerud, and "Failure to Impress" by Douglas Seacat
5. Volume Five (June 2014, 978-1-939480-68-2 (ebook))
  - "A Hero's End" by Aeryn Rudel, "Raiders in the Night" by William Shick, and "Call of the Caber" by Howard Tayler
6. Volume Six (August 2014, 978-1-939480-71-2 (ebook))
  - "Murder in the Honor Fields" by Larry Correia, "Before Death, Retribution" by Erik Scott de Bie, and "Bound for Home" by Michael G. Ryan

Iron Kingdoms Excursions, Season Two:

1. Volume One (October 2014, 978-1-939480-77-4 (ebook))
  - "Creed of Vengeance" by Darla Kennerud, "Fifteen Minutes" by William Shick, and "Get Gone" by Michael G. Ryan
2. Volume Two (November 2014, 978-1-939480-79-8 (ebook))
  - "Duel with the Dead" by Richard Lee Byers, "Liberator" by Josh Vogt, and "Hold Back the Dark" by Larry Correia
3. Volume Three (January 2015, 978-1-939480-82-8 (ebook))
  - "One of Many, Many in One" by William Shick, "Shell Shock" by Erik Scott de Bie, and "What You Believe" by Michael G. Ryan
4. Volume Four (February 2015, 978-1-939480-85-9 (ebook))
  - "Honor in Death" by Josh Vogt, "Record of Valor" by Orrin Grey, and "The Ambush" by Richard Lee Byers
5. Volume Five (May 2015, 978-1-939480-96-5 (ebook))
  - "A Taste for Blood" by Chris A. Jackson, "Imprisoned" by William Shick, and "Blood Sisters" by Oren Ashkenazi

== See also ==
- Iron Kingdoms Character Guide: Full Metal Fantasy, Volume 1
