= Warmachine =

Tabletop steampunk wargame by Steamforged Games

- A metal Juggernaut model from the Khador faction
- Manufacturers: Steamforged Games
- Publishers: Steamforged Games
- Years active: 2003 to present
- Players: 2+
- Chance: Dice rolling used for task resolution

Warmachine is a tabletop steampunk wargame originally produced by Privateer Press but currently under the ownership of Steamforged Games.

The game is played with white metal, plastic, and resin miniatures representing military characters from the Iron Kingdoms setting. Battles are fought between warcasters from rival nations, the large steam-powered warjacks that the warcasters control, and troops consisting of humans and fantasy races.

Warmachine has been the recipient of the 2003 Origins Awards for Best Fantasy Miniatures Rules and Best Fantasy Miniatures Series. In 2005 Warmachine won Game of the Year at Origins and Gamers Choice for Best Miniatures.

A compatible companion game involving the savage factions named Hordes was released in 2006. The Hordes branding has since been retired with the launch of the MKIV edition.

In 2024 Steamforged Games announced, that they have bought the IP of Warmachine and the Iron Kingdoms.

== Overview ==
Warmachine's most distinctive feature is the inclusion of Warcasters and Warjacks (the war machines from which the game derives its name). Warjacks, or 'jacks' for short, are techno-steam powered constructs designed for waging war. They are, in general, powered by a coal-burning steam engine and guided by an arcane supercomputer-like "brain" called a cortex. Heavily armored and often carrying oversized weaponry, 'jacks fill a role similar to traditional military armor such as tanks and artillery. They are several times more durable and powerful than normal troops, but are far more costly.

Warcasters are the pivotal characters of the game. They are powerful generals and spellcasters who have learned to control warjacks as well as serve multiple other roles. In addition to guiding the warjacks' destructive power, they are the army commanders, potent combatants, and powerful spellcasters. Each has a special feat that can be used once per battle; their effects range from subtle to explosive and can be enough to alter the tide of battle.

In addition to warcasters and warjacks, armies can field supporting infantry troops of many varieties, powerful machines of war called battle engines, durable structures that support their infantry troops, and even more massive versions of warjacks known as colossals. Some are infantry or gunners, while others have more specialized roles, from warjack repairmen to "journeyman" warcasters—novice versions of the models that command armies. Most of these troops come in groups and move in formations, but there are also independent characters called solos.

In the first major expansion, Warmachine: Wrath, battle engines were introduced. Battle engines are huge mechanical constructs that are not warjacks and thus do not require focus. Each faction has one battle engine available at the moment.

The second major expansion, Warmachine: Colossals, gave each faction towering warjacks known as Colossals. Taking a role similar to a battleship, each Colossal is heavily armed and capable of dealing and receiving large amounts of damage. Their powerful presence is balanced by their high cost to include them in an army, making the loss of a Colossal during the course of a game a heavy loss of resources.

The third major expansion, Warmachine: Vengeance, added new Epic versions of older warlords, as well as new units, solos and warjacks. The new journeyman warcasters introduced with the video game Warmachine: Tactics (see below) were also added.

Most recently, through the CID or Community Integrated Development process, a new model type has been added called structures. These immobile models often deploy far ahead of normal forces, but may not change positions throughout the game, and provide a powerful, if situational, bonus to your army. Stationed atop the largest base size in the game, these massive buildings can be seen from anywhere on the battlefield, making them tempting targets, but often powerful fortifications.

In June 2024, it was announced that Steamforged Games had acquired the Iron Kingdoms brand, which includes Warmachine and related other titles.

== Gameplay ==
The overall gameplay is supposed to encourage aggression rather than defensive tactics, such as sitting behind fortifications. This was referred to among players and the game's developers as 'Page 5' in previous versions of the game, however in the "Mark 3" rules, the company has pushed into a more balanced direction with regards to both aggressive versus controlling strategies, and the previous performative masculine rhetoric.

Warmachine is similar to many other miniature wargames in that each army consists of several units, each of which acts during a turn. Individual units move, attack, and may perform other actions such as repairing a warjack or using a feat. The primary mechanic unique to Warmachine is the use of focus points. Each warcaster receives a certain number of focus points each turn, which represents that warcaster's power. At the beginning of the turn, focus may be spent to pay for ongoing abilities and allocated between the warlord and 'jacks in the caster's battlegroup within their "Control Area" or sphere of influence - a distance based on the 'caster's focus stat. Focus allows warjacks to become more accurate and powerful by "boosting" their attacks, and to perform special actions called "Power Attacks" such as slamming a model across the battlefield with their heft or throwing an enemy model at another model. Additionally warcasters can use focus to cast spells performing all manner of arcane effects from attacks, to movement bonuses, to offensive/defensive enhancements. Good focus management can often be the difference between winning and losing. The warcaster is the single most important model on either side in the game. If a player's warcaster is killed, they lose the game, no matter how many casualties, or how much damage, they have inflicted on the enemy.

== Releases ==
The first book, Warmachine: Prime, was originally released in 2003, with a revised edition, Warmachine: Prime Remix, released in early 2007. All of the subsequent books have been expansions of Prime. Each expansion usually introduces new warcasters, warjacks, units, and solos, as well as new model subtypes – such as cavalry units – that add new strategies and complexities to each faction. With the release of Mk II, all previous books models have been folded into the new Forces of Warmachine series.

=== Mark I Warmachine ===
- Warmachine: Prime – 2003
- Warmachine: Escalation – 2004
- Warmachine: Apotheosis – 2005
- Warmachine: Superiority – 2006
- Warmachine: Prime Remix – 2007
- Forces of Warmachine: Pirates of the Broken Coast – 2007
- Warmachine: Legends – 2008

Mk II is a complete reworking of the game, with every model available changed and/or recosted, alongside the changes to the rules set. The cards for all models from the Mk I line are also available for purchase as Faction Decks as of January 2010, as is a new template set.

=== Mark II Warmachine ===
- Warmachine: Prime Mk II – January 2010
- Warmachine: Wrath – June 2011
- Warmachine: Colossals – July 2012
- Warmachine: Vengeance – March 2014
- Warmachine: Reckoning – June 2015

- Forces of Warmachine is the name of a series of expansions that each focus on a themed army, as opposed to having additions to all of the factions.

- Forces of Warmachine: Retribution of Scyrah – 2009
- Forces of Warmachine: Cygnar – February 2010
- Forces of Warmachine: Khador – March 2010
- Forces of Warmachine: Protectorate of Menoth – April 2010
- Forces of Warmachine: Cryx – June 2010
- Forces of Warmachine: Mercenaries – July 2010
- Forces of Warmachine: Convergence of Cyriss – July 2013

Mark III (referred to as "All New War" by Privateer Press) is another reworking of the game. As with MK II all models and point levels of army lists have been updated. Privateer Press has begun the Community Integrated Development or CID process to involve players in the development of errata, new releases, and theme forces as a quality control mechanism in what they are calling a "continuous development" goal. The idea of this process is to avoid new version releases following Mark 3. As a result, all model cards and the base rules set are available on the Privateer Press website.

=== Mark III Warmachine ===
- Warmachine: Prime Mk III – June 2016

In July 2017 new faction was released: Grymkin (limited release, not limited edition). This was first step to prepare to the next global event.

In July 2018 the next limited release faction appeared—the Crucible Guard.

In October 2019 new global campaign started, forming new alliances to resist invading new faction of daemons—Infernals.

In December 2019 a new Twitter account @HengeholdScroll started to report what was going on the battlefield, revealing character motivations and relations.

=== WARMACHINE: MKIV ===
In July 2022, WARMACHINE: MKIV was announced. Support for this edition began in January 2023. MKIV introduced a roughly 10 year time jump, which saw many existing factions and characters change drastically. All pre-MKIV models are now out of print from the publisher.

The out of print Legacy armies have received updated rules, and all models can be played in the new edition. The rules for the game are provided for free through the Warmachine app.

The new WARMACHINE: MKIV armies are Cygnar Storm Legion, Khador Winter Korps, Dusk House Kallyss, Orgoth Sea Raiders, Southern Kriels Brineblood Marauders, Khymaera Shadowflame Shard, Cryx necrofactorium and Cygnar gravediggers. There are also two announced armies that haven't been released yet: Khador old umbrey, and Southern kriels kithguard New models are mostly made with 3D printing technology.

== Warmachine: Tactics ==
On August 14, 2009, Privateer Press announced they were in the beginning stages of development for a Warmachine video game. The contract is with WhiteMoon Dreams, a small Los Angeles based video games company. WhiteMoon Dreams is an indie game developer with programmers with experience working on hit titles such as the Fallout series, Myth 3, Flower, the Ratchet & Clank series, and the Medal of Honor series.

On July 10, 2013, Privateer Press launched a Kickstarter project to aid development of this game now titled Warmachine: Tactics, ultimately raising a total of $1,578,950.

On July 9, 2014, the game was released on Steam under the Early Access program, meaning that people can buy and play the game while it is still in development and enjoy updates as they are released.

The developers had initially aimed for a full release in August 2014, but by that date the game remained in early access, with only the online multiplayer available and the game still not having fully implemented all the models to be included in the full general release. By early November 2014 all models to be included in the full release were available for use in online multiplayer, with the full 21 mission single player campaign released at the end of the same month.

== Grind ==
Grind is an arena sports/combat board game published by Privateer Press in 2009 set the Warmachine universe in which each player tries to maneuver a giant spiked ball into their opponent's goal using warjacks. It was designed by Duncan Huffman, Doug Seacat, Jason Soles, Rob Stoddard, and Matt Wilson. Each player customizes each steamjack's weaponry, and then places all five steamjacks anywhere on their side of the board. Like ice hockey, the object is to hit the grinder ball into the opposition goal while bodychecking opposition figurines out of the way.
