= Steve Diamond =

Stephen, Steve or Steven Diamond may refer to:

- Steve Diamond (rugby league) (born 1953), English rugby league player
- Steve Diamond (rugby union) (born 1969), English rugby union coach and player
- Steve Diamond (musician), songwriter, producer, and multi-instrumentalist
