= Hordes (game) =

Tabletop miniature wargame

- Kaya the Wildborn. A Hordes warlock model belonging to The Circle Orboros faction.
- Manufacturers: Privateer Press
- Publishers: Privateer Press
- Years active: 2006 to present
- Players: 2+
- Chance: Dice rolling used for task resolution
- Website: http://privateerpress.com/hordes

Hordes is a 30mm tabletop miniature wargame produced by Privateer Press, announced at Gen Con 2005 and released on April 22, 2006. Although a completely standalone game in its own right, Hordes was designed as a companion to Warmachine, Privateer Press' flagship miniatures game. The games are 100% compatible, and share much of the same rules set, although the most important mechanic - fury for Hordes and focus for Warmachine - remains unique to each. Hordes forces and Warmachine forces often face off against each other both on the tabletop and in the background fiction. The games share the same setting, the Iron Kingdoms, with much of the Hordes storyline taking place in the wild areas away from the 'civilized' areas where Warmachine's major action takes place.

Hordes won the 2006 Origins Award for Miniatures Game or Expansion of the Year.

== Gameplay ==
As in Warmachine, gameplay in Hordes is supposed to promote offensive play; defensive play is possible, but the spirit of the game (as laid out in Page 5 of Primal) encourages "testosterone-laden aggression". Play is centered on Warlocks and their attendant Warbeasts, who may be supported by units and solos. Warbeasts generate fury (an equivalent to focus which is allocated or not at the start of your turn), which can be controlled by Warlocks and used to fuel their spells, but if left unchecked can cause the beasts to go into an uncontrolled frenzy, potentially even attacking their allies or controlling warlock.

Hordes is similar to Warmachine in most aspects; if you already know how to play Warmachine then you already know the basics of Hordes. The core mechanic is the same as its companion game Warmachine: roll two six-sided dice, add one stat, and compare the total to an opposing stat. Additionally, almost all rules mechanics from Warmachine are replicated in Hordes. Together, the two rules sets form a single rules superset, which consists mostly of rules common to both games, and partially of mechanics specific to one game or the other. The game-specific mechanics are generally those used by warlocks and warbeasts for Hordes, and warcasters and warjacks for Warmachine, while those rules covering generally how models move, act, and how their actions are resolved are common to both.

Replacing the Warcaster as the commander of the army is a Warlock, a powerful magic-user who draws upon the collective Fury of his warbeasts to cast spells and heal damage. As the four factions in Hordes use no steamjacks, their functional parallel are Warbeasts, large savage creatures. The Warlock is able to "force" Warbeasts to perform special attacks, which builds up Fury points. The Warlock is then able to "leach" this Fury to add to his pool, otherwise the warbeast will continue to gather Fury, eventually losing control and going into an uncontrollable rage. This system has been dubbed "Risk Management" as opposed to the "Resource Management" system in Warmachine.

The first rule book for the Hordes system is called Primal. It contains all the latest rules for the Hordes (and Warmachine) system, and army lists for the four 'factions' along with some Minions who will work for various armies. An expansion for the game called Evolution was released by Privateer Press in August 2007. A third expansion, Metamorphosis, was released in 2009.

In 2010 a major rules revision, called MkII, was released following a similar revision for Warmachine. The current main rule book is called Primal MkII. It contained the latest rules and stats for a subset of the released figures for each faction. After this five Forces of Hordes books were released, one for each main faction and one for the Minions, each one containing stats for all released models for that faction and some new units. MkII saw its first expansion in December 2011 when the book Domination was released. In December 2016, Forces of Hordes: Trollbloods Command was released and featured all the current faction and profile rules for Trollblood models in Hordes Mk II. In addition, the rulebook also contained new troops to add to the fray, including an all-new Warlock. The sourcebook also contained an in-depth look at the history and structure of trollkin kriels.

=== Hordes/Warmachine interaction ===
From the beginning, Hordes was designed to be played against Warmachine. Playing a Warmachine army against a Hordes army is little different from playing two Hordes armies or two Warmachine armies against each other, and many of the special rules are written so that they affect models from both games in similar ways. As an example, damage is recorded differently for warbeasts (in branches) and warjacks (in columns), but most effects which let you choose a column to record damage against a warjack also let you choose a branch, and vice versa. However, each game does have models which possess special rules which are not effective against models from the other game.

== Factions ==
Six factions native to the Iron Kingdoms make up the armies of Hordes:

=== Trollbloods ===
A collection of various troll breeds, banding together to push back both the civilized nations of Immoren and the forces of the wild from their territories. Trollkin and the Pygmy Trolls (their diminutive counterparts) comprise the more intelligent, civilized troll breeds and fill the role of basic troops in a troll army, while the larger, stronger, and more savage cousins, the full-blood trolls, are used as light warbeasts.

Full-blood trolls can be grouped into two general categories, those who use hand-held weapons and those who rely on their own unique physiology. The Troll Axer, Impaler, and Bouncer fall into the former category, specializing in melee, ranged, and defensive roles respectively, while the Pyre, Winter, and Slag Trolls can add fire, cold, and corrosion effects to either their melee or ranged attacks, making both groups fairly versatile to field.

Rarer and much more dangerous than either trollkin or full-blood trolls are the Dire Trolls, giant full-blooded troll beasts that dwarf even other full-blood trolls whose ravenous and seemingly endless appetites frighten man, beast, and trollkin alike. These monsters are exclusively used as heavy warbeasts and include the Dire Troll Mauler, Blitzer, and Earthborn, which is also the Trollkin's Alpha Warbeast. Finally the advent of Metamorphosis saw the addition of "Mulg the Ancient" to the Trollkin's ranks, the oldest and most powerful of Dire Trolls.

Matt Wilson of Privateer Press has stated the Trollbloods will be the 'protagonist' faction of Hordes. In play they are extremely tough and resilient, very strong melee fighters and have great synergy between various units and their Warlocks. To compensate for their strength and resilience the Trolls are largely regarded as the second slowest of the four factions, but with their staying power and strength of arms they can endure punishment that would shatter other factions' defenses.

=== Circle Orboros ===
A secret cabal of powerful druids, cultists, and wilderness tribes that command the forces of nature against their foes. Led by the Omnipotents, a trio of master druids and spellcasters, the druids follow three primary paths of elemental power: Beast, Storm, and Stone, and each of the three warlocks introduced in "Hordes: Primal" exemplify one of these paths.

While the druids are the largely undisputed masters of the Circle they have allied themselves with the Tharn, a race of human cannibals dedicated to the worship of the Devourer Wurm, one of the aspects of the druids' god, Orboros. The druids' magical power is easily matched by physical prowess of the Tharn, who are able to call upon the Devourer Wurm to warp their bodies into amalgamations of beast and man before throwing themselves against their enemies. These two groups comprise the bulk of a Circle army's troop choices.

Finally the Circle uses both the beasts of the wild and elemental constructs called wolds as their warbeasts. With a penchant for wolves the Circle employs the two-headed Argus and bipedal Gorax as their living light warbeast choices, with the Woldwatcher and Woldwyrd representing the elemental constructs. Their heavy warbeasts include the Gnarlhorn and Shadowhorn Satyrs, the Feral Warpwolf and Pureblood Warpwolf, the Woldwarden, and Megalith, a unique woldwarden constructed by one of the warlocks from Primal.

The Circle's play style is typically fast and furious, using existing terrain against their opponents and often creating terrain of their own while their beasts and units use both their high speed and various teleportation abilities (a trait fairly unusual of the Circle) to get where they need to be when needed. Whether spellcaster or melee unit all Circle troops can move across any terrain without penalty. As agile as they are, however, the Circle does not have the armor or tenacity to stand long in a straight up, prolonged fight. In general a Circle army must hit hard and either destroy their target, or retreat to avoid any serious counterattack.

=== Skorne ===
A warlike, savage humanoid race invading from beyond the Bloodstone Marches. Built on a philosophy of pain they have turned the act of torture into an art form, documenting in exacting detail their own physiology as well as those of the various beasts that they have encountered and enslaved in their homeland. Organized into castes and split into various warring houses, Skorne society is built upon the backs of countless slaves, both humanoid and animal. A very organized, militaristic faction, their troops are highly regimented and disciplined, focusing primarily on melee combat with relatively few ranged choices.

Like the Circle they employ a variety of species of warbeasts, with the versatile Cyclops Savage, Brute, and Shaman filling melee offense, defense, and magical roles respectively while the Basilisk Drake and Krea fill ranged and support roles. As for heavies the Skorne, like the Trolls, specialize in melee combat: the Titan Gladiator, Titan Bronzeback, Rhinodon, and Molik Karn (their unique warbeast introduced in Metamorphosis) all excel in both damage output and resilience, with the Titan Cannoneer filling both melee and ranged roles.

A Skorne army plays similar to a Troll army, with a few notable differences. Arguably the slowest of the Hordes factions, the Skorne excel at regimented, brick-style combat, with hardened melee troops and beasts forming a wall in front with ranged and support units behind, but whereas the trolls specialize in defense and endurance, the Skorne specialize in offense and damage output, even at the expense of their own troops and beasts. Most notably the Skorne have access to several abilities that can turn their losses into advantages, more than any other Hordes faction, giving them an edge in battles of attrition. Several army additions released in Hordes: Evolution and Metamorphosis drastically changed the original Primal Skorne play-style, allowing them to field more varied types of armies, but the tried-and-true Skorne brick is still a powerhouse to contend with, for few factions can deal out more damage than the Skorne in straight-up melee combat.

=== Legion of Everblight ===
An army of draconic horrors and twisted creatures who serve the newly reawakened (but not reformed) dragon, Everblight, the Legion is led by the blighted ogrun Thagrosh, Prophet and now Messiah of Everblight, who discovered the resting place of Everblight's crystal heart, or athanc, thrust it into his own chest, and thus unleashed the Legion into the world. All of the Legion Warlocks carry a shard of the athanc within themselves, linking themselves both to the mind of Everblight as well as each other. The energy emanating from the athanc shards, called blight, has both corrupting and mutational properties, which can be used to warp and twist others to the will of Everblight. The first victims of this influence were the Nyss, the arctic race of elves which lived near the mountain where Everblight's athanc was discovered by Thagrosh, and these blighted Nyss comprise the bulk of a Legion's unit and troop choices. Apart from the Nyss several tribes of ogrun have been subjected to the blight as well, giving the Legion limited heavy troop options. The warbeasts of the Legion are all dragonspawn, hideous eyeless draconic creatures created from the blood of Everblight's warlocks.

Two hallmarks of the Legion are the inclusion of lesser warbeasts, a third category of beasts apart from lights and heavies, and the inclusion of warbeasts with wings, making them highly maneuverable. The three lessers to date, the Shredder, Stinger and winged Harrier, serve primarily as expendable shock troops or damage sinks. Their light beasts are more diverse, with the Teraph and Nephilim Protector filling defensive roles, the Nephilim Soldier and Raek providing melee offense options. The Nephilim Bolt Thrower provides ranged support. The Legion also has access to a number of heavy warbeasts. The Carnivean and Scythean focus on melee damage while the winged Angelius is a fast, maneuverable assassin. Additionally, the Ravagore provides a balance of melee power and artillery-like support with its fiery breath, and the winged Seraph specializes in ranged combat and maneuverability. Typhon, the Legion's unique warbeast introduced in Metamorphosis, was at the time the only Legion warbeast capable of throwing its victims, a previously unheard of ability among Legion beasts. This changed with the release of Hordes Mk.II, which presented updated rules that gave the Carnivean and Ravagore the ability to grab and throw as well.

The Legion play style is similar to the Circle, fast and maneuverable but not very durable. The primary differences are that whereas the Circle relies on synergy between their units, beasts, and warlocks to get the job done, each element of a Legion army is designed to function independently, with each element working alone but in sync with the others to get the job done. Finally while the Circle has a definite focus on magical attacks, the Legion is predominantly focused on fast, hard-hitting alpha strikes.

=== Grymkin ===
The Grymkin are the denizens of the wilderness of Urcaen beyond the protection of the gods - essentially hell for all intents and purposes. Grymkin are not undead, or demons, but have both souls and physical bodies. The warbeasts are the nightmares of the Defiers given flesh and blood. For millennia they tormented the defiers before they learned to control them. The lesser Grymkin are those wicked souls who end up in the wilds of Urcaen and are judged and transformed by the Defiers as an eternal punishment.

The Defiers themselves are five humans who were banished to the wilds of Urcaen for refusing Menoth's law. Their wills were so strong that they each became demigods dedicated to opposing Menoth and punishing his creation, which they see as corrupt and wicked.

For centuries, the Defiers awaited their chance to return to Caen to unleash their wicked harvest on Menoth's civilization. It was not until the Old Witch devised a way to create a portal to Urcaen through which the armies of the grymkin could pass that they got their chance. The Old Witch's motive for unleashing hell on earth was—oddly enough—to use the Grymkin to slow the spread of infernalism that would one day unleash an even worse hell on earth if left unchecked.

If Infernals ever invaded Caen in full force, it would mean the end of the world and the eternal torment of all living souls. The Grymkin, then, are the world's twisted salvation from annihilation.

The Grymkin playstyle is based around punishing the opponent for taking certain actions and has a heavy emphasis on reaping corpses to power their abilities. They are melee-centric and have the worst ranged abilities of any faction. Even Minions out shoot them.

=== Minions ===
Occasionally other creatures in the wilds of western Immoren are caught up in the conflicts of the region. Some are individuals seeking profit. Others are small groups of tribal creatures willing to offer their strength of arms to others, whether in return for protection or supplies or to preserve their home territories from enemies. Events can sweep up these minor players against their will as they are captured, enslaved, or coerced into doing the bidding of the factions that are more numerous or powerful.

Whatever their concerns or motivations, minions bring versatility to their sponsors. Swamp gobbers bring the inventive alchemy of their fog bellows to cloak allies in concealing mist. Farrow brigands offer rifles and clubs for hire and willing to take the brunt of enemy assaults. Gatormen are among the most vicious and deadly warriors in the region, with a combination of physical prowess and tough scaled hides. Bog trogs emerge from the wetlands wielding barbed hooks and take advantage of their natural camouflage to ambush and surprise the enemy.

== Books ==
- Mark I Hordes

- Hordes: Primal MK I (2006)
- Hordes: Evolution (2007)
- Hordes: Metamorphosis (2009)

- Mark II Hordes

- Hordes: Primal MK II (2010)
- Hordes: Domination (2011)
- Hordes: Gargantuans (2013)
- Hordes: Exigence (2014)
- Hordes: Devastation (Late 2015)

- Forces of Hordes is the name of a series of expansions that each focus on a themed army, as opposed to having additions to all of the factions.

- Forces of Hordes: Skorne (2010)
- Forces of Hordes: Trollbloods (2010)
- Forces of Hordes: Legion of Everblight (2010)
- Forces of Hordes: Circle of Orboros (2010)
- Forces of Hordes: Minions (2010)

Mk II is a complete reworking of the game, with every model available changed and/or recosted, alongside the changes to the rules set. The cards for all models from the Mk I line are also available for purchase as Faction Decks as of January 2010, as is a new template set.

The year 2009 saw an open "Field Test" of the Hordes Mk II rules, hosted on Privateer Press' website. Players could download a full set of rules, plus rules for every model in the game, and post feedback to Privateer Press through an online field test website.

- Mark III Hordes

- Hordes: Primal MK III (June 2016)
- Forces of Hordes: Trollbloods Command (December 2016)
- Forces of Hordes: Circle Obroros Command (February 2017)
- Forces of Hordes: Legion of Everblight Command (March 2017)
- Forces of Hordes: Grymkin—The Wicked Harvest (July 2017)
- Forces of Hordes: Skorne Command (September 2017)

Mk III is another reworking of the game. As with MK II all models have been updated. They are also releasing new Forces books. During Mk III a new faction was released: Grymkin. They were announced at Smogcon 2017 on February 17, 2017.
