= Matt Wilson (artist) =

American fantasy artist

- Known for: Fantasy art
- Website: www.mattwilsonart.com

Matthew D. "Matt" Wilson is an artist whose work has appeared in role-playing games. He is one of the founders, the owner, and the CEO of Privateer Press.

== Early life and education ==
Matthew D. Wilson grew up in a small town in northern California, and first encountered role-playing games at age 12.

== Career ==
Matt Wilson started as an artist with Alderac Entertainment Group around 1995, and worked there as an art director before also doing art direction for companies Wizards of the Coast and FASA. Wilson and his friend Brian Snoddy formed Privateer Press with writer Matt Staroscik to publish their own d20 supplements. Wilson and Snoddy produced the covers and interior art for Privateer's first adventures published in 2001.

His artwork for D&D has been featured in A Darkness Gathering (1998), Forgotten Realms Campaign Setting (2001), Faiths and Pantheons (2002), and Unapproachable East (2003).
