= Bryan Thomas Schmidt =

American novelist

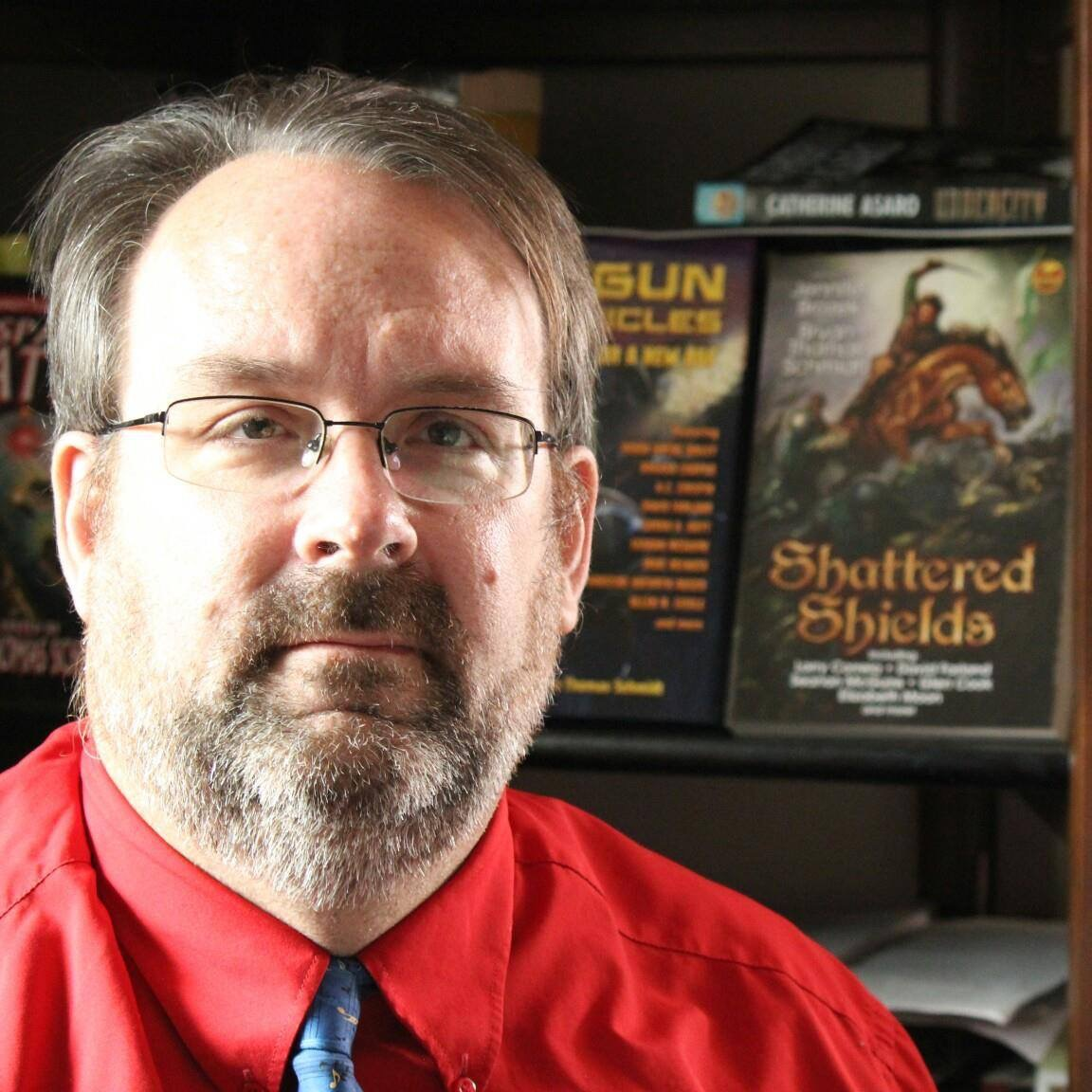
- Born: February 13, 1969 (age 57); Topeka, Kansas, U.S.
- Education: Master's Degree
- Alma mater: Carnegie Mellon University, California State University at Fullerton, Covenant Seminary
- Occupations: Editor; writer
- Writing career
- Language: English
- Years active: 2008-present
- Genres: Fantasy; Horror; Science fiction; Thriller; Mystery
- Notable works: Shattered Shields; Infinite Stars; Saga of Davi Rhii; Robots Through The Ages; Shortcut
- Website: bryanthomasschmidt.net

Bryan Thomas Schmidt (born February 13, 1969) is an American science fiction author and editor. He has edited (or co-edited) twenty-two anthologies, and written a space opera trilogy, and an ongoing, near-future police procedural series set in Kansas City, Missouri, and a near future thriller novel being developed as a motion picture. He wrote a non-fiction book on how to write a novel. He was a finalist, with Jennifer Brozek, for the 2015 Hugo Award for Best Professional Editor for the anthology Shattered Shields. His anthology Infinite Stars was nominated for the 2018 Locus Award for Best Anthology.

== Biography ==
Schmidt was born on February 13, 1969, in Topeka, Kansas. His works sometime incorporate Christian themes. Schmidt's first published works were the short stories in his The North Star Serial, a 2010 series of space opera stories depicting an ongoing war. The Worker Prince, the first novel in his Saga of Davi Rhii series, was published in 2011. The second novel, The Returning, was released the following year in June, two months after his first anthology, Full-Throttle Space Tales 6: Space Battles, was published in April through Flying Pen Press. In 2013, Schmidt edited Beyond the Sun, a space opera anthology from Fairwood Press, and Raygun Chronicles: Space Opera for a New Age from Every Day Publishing.

After a recommendation from Jennifer Brozek, he was asked to edit The Martian. He worked with the author, Andy Weir, to improve the story. In 2014, he was nominated for the Hugo Award for Best Professional Editor (short form) for his anthology work, but missed the cutoff for the final ballot by six votes. (Note: Schmidt received 6 votes less than the last nominee that made the cutoff.) The following year, he and Brozek edited the fantasy adventure anthology, Shattered Shields, published by Baen Books. They were both nominated for the 2015 Hugo Award for Best Editor (short form) for Shattered Shields. His space opera anthology, Mission: Tomorrow, was released by Baen in 2015. Schmidt worked with WordFire Press in 2016 to release the young adult short story anthology Decision Points. The same year he released Galactic Games, a science fiction sports anthology, from Baen.

In addition to The Exodus, the final volume in his Davi Rhii trilogy, Schmidt had six anthologies published in 2017. In March, he co-edited Little Green Men—Attack! with Robin Wayne Bailey. His second WordFire anthology, Maximum Velocity: The Best of the Full-Throttle Space Tales, co-edited with Jennifer Brozek, Carol Hightshoe, David Lee Summers, and Dayton Ward, collected the best stories from the "Full-Throttle Space Tales" series of anthologies. The space opera anthology Infinite Stars and the media tie-in anthology Predator: If It Bleeds (set in the Predator universe), both from Titan Books, were released in October. Infinite Stars received a starred review in Publishers Weekly and was also ranked 15th in the Best Anthology category of the 2018 Locus Awards. That same month, he also released Joe Ledger: Unstoppable, co-edited with Jonathan Maberry), from St. Martin's Press and from Baen The Monster Hunter Files, co-edited with Larry Correia).

The first volume in his John Simon near-future police procedural series, Simon Says, was released in October 2019. Infinite Stars: Dark Frontiers, a follow-up anthology to the 2017 collection, was released through Titan Books in November. The second and third volumes in the John Simon series, The Sideman and Common Source, were released in June and September 2020, respectively. A COVID-19 charity anthology, Surviving Tomorrow, was released in October that year through Aeristic Press. Proceeds from the anthology went to purchase COVID-19 test kits.

Schmidt, with Jonathan Maberry, edited Alien vs. Predator: Ultimate Prey, released in December 2021 from Titan Books. The Hitherto Secret Experiments of Marie Curie, a dark young adult anthology co-edited with Henry Herz, was originally scheduled for a November 2022 release, but was released in April 2023 through Blackstone Publishing. His novel, Shortcut, will be published by Villainous Press, and released in September 2023. He co-edited the Robots Through the Ages anthology with Robert Silverberg.

== Bibliography ==
=== Standalone novels ===
- Abraham Lincoln: Dinosaur Hunter: Land of Legends (March 2013, Delabarre Publishing, ISBN 978-1-61941-054-1)
- Shortcut (forthcoming 2023, Villainous Press, ISBN 978-1622251940)

=== Saga of Davi Rhii ===
A science fiction series loosely based on the biblical story of Moses.

1. The Worker Prince (October 2011, Diminished Media Group, ISBN 978-0-9840209-0-4)
2. The Returning (June 2012, Diminished Media Group, ISBN 978-0-9840209-4-2)
3. The Exodus (September 2017, WordFire Press, ISBN 978-1-61475-558-6)

In addition to the three novels, two short stories were written in the series:

- "Rivalry on the Sky Course" on Residential Aliens webzine (2011)
- "The Hand of God" in Full-Throttle Space Tales 6: Space Battles (2012, Flying Pen Press, ISBN 978-0-9845927-5-3)

An omnibus, collecting books 1-3 and the shorts "Rivalry on the Sky Course" and "The Hand of God", was released in October 2021 by Boralis Books (ISBN 9781622257881).

=== John Simon series ===
A near-future police procedural series about a technophobic Kansas City police detective and his android partner.

1. Simon Says (October 2019, Boralis Books, ISBN 978-1-62225-750-8)
2. The Sideman (February 2020, Boralis Books, ISBN 978-1-62225-755-3)
3. Common Source (June 2020, Boralis Books, ISBN 978-1-62225-758-4)

A short work, "The Cancellation", appears in Shapers of Worlds, Volume II edited by Edward Willett (November 2021, Shadowpaw Press). Another short work, "Dogwatch", appears in "Joe Ledger: Unbreakable" edited by Jonathan Maberry and Schmidt, (forthcoming November 2023, JournalStone)

=== Anthologies ===
Schmidt edited (or co-edited) the following anthologies:

- Full-Throttle Space Tales 6: Space Battles (April 2012, Flying Pen Press, ISBN 978-0-9845927-5-3)
- Beyond the Sun (August 2013, Fairwood Press, ISBN 978-1-933846-38-5)
- Raygun Chronicles: Space Opera for a New Age (December 2013, Every Day Publishing, ISBN 978-0-9881257-5-9)
- Shattered Shields with Jennifer Brozek (November 2014, Baen, ISBN 978-1-4767-3701-0)
- Mission: Tomorrow (November 2015, Baen, ISBN 978-1-4767-8094-8)
- Decision Points (April 2016, WordFire Press, ISBN 978-1-61475-424-4)
- Galactic Games (June 2016, Baen, ISBN 978-1-4767-8158-7)
- Little Green Men—Attack! with Robin Wayne Bailey (March 2017, Baen, ISBN 978-1-4767-8213-3)
- Maximum Velocity: The Best of the Full-Throttle Space Tales with Jennifer Brozek, Carol Hightshoe, David Lee Summers, and Dayton Ward (August 2017, WordFire Press, ISBN 978-1-61475-529-6)
- Infinite Stars (October 2017, Titan Books, ISBN 978-1-78565-593-7)
- Joe Ledger: Unstoppable with Jonathan Maberry (October 2017, St. Martin's Griffin, ISBN 978-1-250-09080-5)
- The Monster Hunter Files with Larry Correia (October 2017, Baen, ISBN 978-1-4814-8275-2)
- Predator: If It Bleeds (October 2017, Titan Books, ISBN 978-1-78565-540-1)
- Infinite Stars: Dark Frontiers (November 2019, Titan Books, ISBN 978-1-78909-291-2)
- Surviving Tomorrow (October 2020, Aeristic Press, ISBN 978-1-953134-02-8)
- Alien vs. Predator: Ultimate Prey with Jonathan Maberry (December 2021, Titan Books, ISBN 978-1-78909-794-8)
- Predator: Eyes of the Demon (August 2022, Titan Books, ISBN 978-1-80336-029-4
- The Hitherto Secret Experiments of Marie Curie with Henry Herz (April 2023, Blackstone Publishing, ISBN 978-1-66504-703-6)
- Robots Through the Ages with Robert Silverberg (July 2023, Blackstone Publishing, ISBN 979-821238483-4)
- Joe Ledger: Unbreakable with Jonathan Maberry (November 2023, JournalStone, ISBN 978-1-68510-088-9)

=== Short works ===
Listed chronologically by release date.

- "The Maintenance Man" (February–March 2010, on Einstein's Pocket Watch webzine)
- The North Star Serial (May 2010)
  - "Return of the Koreleans"
  - "The Ambush"
  - "The Chase"
  - "The Getaway"
  - "The Interrogation"
  - "The Korelean General"
  - "The Korelean Raiders"
  - "The North Star"
  - "The Orphaning"
  - "The Pirates"
  - "The Resurrection Begun"
  - "The Scout"
  - "The Supply Run"
- "Amélie's Guardian" (March 2011, in Of Fur and Fire: Tales of Cats & Dragons from DreamZion Publishing, ISBN 978-1-4610-3277-9)
- "Duncan Derring and the Call of the Lady Luck" (July 2012, in Wandering Weeds from Hall Brothers Entertainment, ISBN 978-1-4811-5876-3)
- "La Migra" (August 2012, in Tales of the Talisman, Volume 8, Issue 1 from Hadrosaur Productions, ISBN 978-1-885093-64-6)
- "Border Time" with Kate Corcino (April 2016, in Secret Agendas from IDW Publishing, ISBN 978-1-63140-720-8)
- "Back to Black" with Jonathan Maberry (December 2016, in SNAFU: Black Ops from Cohesion Press, ISBN 978-0-9946304-5-2)
- "First Million Contacts" with Alex Shvartsman (March 2017, in Little Green Men—Attack!)
- "The Greatest Guns in the Galaxy" with Ken Scholes (July 2017, in Straight Outta Tombstone from Baen, ISBN 978-1-4814-8269-1)
- "Drug War" with Holly Roberds (October 2017, in Predator: If It Bleeds)
- "Huffman Strikes Back" with Julie Frost (October 2017, in The Monster Hunter Files)
- "Instinct (A Ghost Story)" with G. P. Charles (October 2017, in Joe Ledger: Unstoppable)
- "The Coming End" with Jonathan Miller (July 2020, in Abyss & Apex, 3rd Quarter 2020 from Abyss & Apex Publishing)
- "It's a Mud, Mud World" with Peter J. Wacks (October 2020, in Weird World War III from Baen, ISBN 978-1-982124-91-5)
- "First Hunt" (December 2021, in Alien vs. Predator: Ultimate Prey)
- "Aftermath" (August 2022, in Predator:Eyes of the Demon)
- "The Magic of Science" with G. P. Charles (April 2023, in The Hitherto Secret Experiments of Marie Curie)
- "The Maxx Factor" (August 2023, standalone sequel to Shortcut on Kindle)
- "Dogwatch" (forthcoming November 2023, in Joe Ledger: Unbreakable)

=== Collections ===
Schmidt's stories have been collected in the following volumes:

- The North Star Serial, Part 1 (May 2010, Schmidt Sousa Publications, ISBN 978-1-4528-2280-8)

=== Nonfiction ===
- 102 More Hilarious Dinosaur Jokes, illustrated by Evan Peter (April 2013, Delabarre Publishing, ISBN 9781484813539)
- How to Write a Novel: The Fundamentals of Fiction (October 2018, Inkitt, ISBN 978-1-7313-7697-8)
- "Guest Reference Library" (November–December 2022 issue of Analog Science Fiction and Fact)
- "Guest Editorial: Disappointing Ben Franklin—Tough Choices Between Safety and Privacy" with Brian Gifford (September–October 2023 issue of Analog Science Fiction and Fact)

== Awards and honors ==
Schmidt has been nominated for a number of awards for his various works.

Year	Organization	Award title, Category	Work	Result	Refs
2011	Barnes & Noble	Best Science Fiction Releases of 2011	The Worker Prince	Honorable mention	
2014	World Science Fiction Convention	Hugo Award, Best Editor (Short Form)		Nom. below cutoff	
2015	World Science Fiction Convention	Hugo Award, Best Editor (Short Form)	Shattered Shields (with Jennifer Brozek)	Nominated	
2018	Locus	Locus Award, Best Anthology	Infinite Stars	15	
