= Spaceship Zero (role-playing game) =

Spaceship Zero is a 2002 role-playing game published by Green Ronin Publishing.

== Gameplay ==
Spaceship Zero is a game in which test pilots of the first "Better‑Than‑Light" ship are stranded in a perilous mirror universe, battling aliens and madness in a complete game with an introductory adventure.

== Reception ==
The game won the 2003 ENnie silver award for Best Non-Open-Gaming Product.

== Reviews ==
- Pyramid
- Fictional Reality #11
- Legions Realm Monthly (Issue 8 - Apr 2003)
