= Larry Correia =

American fantasy writer (born 1977)

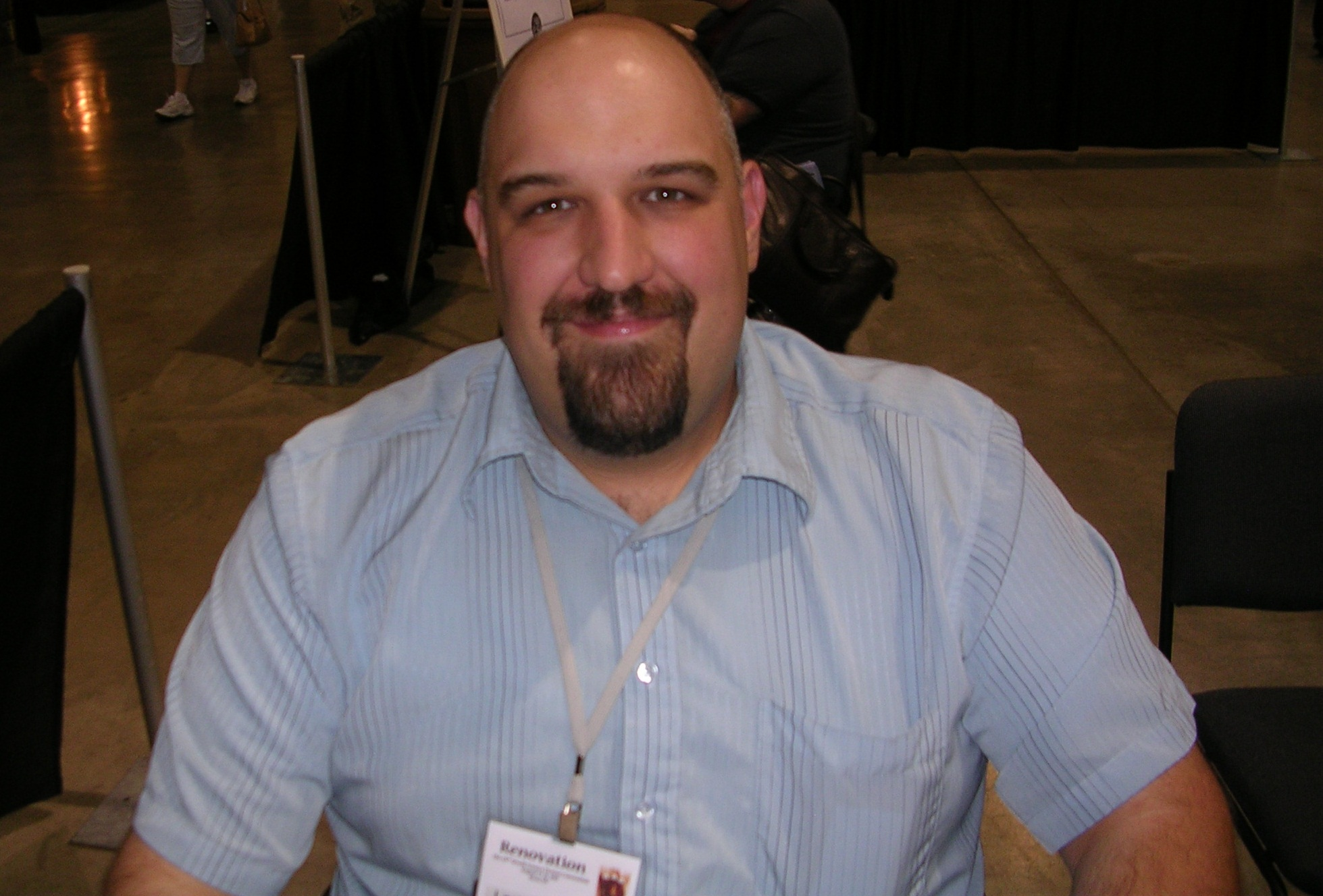
- Correia at WorldCon
- Born: 1977 (age 48–49)
- Education: Utah State University
- Occupation: Author
- Writing career
- Period: 2007–present
- Genres: Urban fantasy; Thriller; Fantasy; Science fiction
- Notable works: Monster Hunter International; Hard Magic; Spellbound; Son of the Black Sword; Monster Hunter Memoirs: Grunge; House of Assassins
- Notable awards: Audie (2012, 2013); Dragon (2016, 2017, 2019, 2021)
- Website: monsterhunternation.com

Larry Correia (/kəˈriː.ə/; born 1977) is an American fantasy and science fiction writer, known for his Monster Hunter International, Grimnoir Chronicles, and Saga of the Forgotten Warrior series. He has authored or co-authored over 30 novels, has over 50 published short works, two collections of stories, and has co-edited four published anthologies.

He was nominated for the John W. Campbell Award for Best New Writer in 2011, and his works have been nominated for the Audie Award multiple times, winning twice. He has won the Dragon Award for Best Military Science Fiction or Best Fantasy Novel four times. In 2013, Correia started the Sad Puppies campaign to nominate works for the Hugo Award, including his own, that he claimed were more popular but often unfairly passed over in favor of more literary works and stories with progressive political themes.

== Early life ==
Correia grew up in El Nido, California, working on his Portuguese father's dairy farm until his mid-teens, when his family moved to Utah. He stayed in California for about a year before joining his family in Utah. While attending Utah State University, Correia—who was raised Catholic—joined The Church of Jesus Christ of Latter-day Saints and served a two-year mission in Alabama.

After returning home from his mission, Correia got married before graduating with an accounting degree. He worked as an accountant for several years before he opened a gun store with business partners while continuing to work as an accountant. He also started working as a firearms instructor and a CCW instructor. In 2013, he began working as a writer full-time.

== Writing career ==
Correia's works often include magic and mythical monsters, such as vampires and werewolves. His stories are typically action-oriented with accurate and detailed depictions of firearms usage. Correia used to be active on firearms discussion boards, where he would write about his interest in weapons and low-budget monster movies, and also get inspiration from various online threads. The original rough draft of Dead Six appeared on one of these forums, "The High Road", in a thread started by Mike Kupari called "Welcome Back, Mr. Nightcrawler".

His self-published first novel, Monster Hunter International, was written for—and marketed directly to—the posters on these boards. One of these posters had once worked in a large independent bookstore, and passed it on to his old employer—who in turn passed it to Baen Books—which offered Correia a publishing contract. Monster Hunter International, despite being self-published, reached the Entertainment Weekly bestseller list in April 2008, before he received this publishing contract. Monster Hunter International was re-released by Baen in July 2009 and was on the Locus bestseller list in November 2009.

The sequel, Monster Hunter Vendetta, was a New York Times bestseller when released in September 2010. The third book in the series, Monster Hunter Alpha, was released in July 2011 and was also a New York Times bestseller. Dead Six, the first book in a new trilogy co-authored with Mike Kupari, was released in September 2011. Correia was a finalist for the 2011 John W. Campbell Award for Best New Writer. The fourth Monster Hunter International novel, Monster Hunter Legion, received 17 fewer nominations than the least-nominated finalist for the 2013 Hugo Award for Best Novel.

Correia's The Grimnoir Chronicles trilogy, set in an alternate and magical 1930s, began with the release of Hard Magic in May 2011. The second book, Spellbound, was released in November that same year. The audiobook versions of Hard Magic and Spellbound won Audie Awards in 2012 and 2013 (respectively). Warbound (August 2013), the final book in the trilogy, was a finalist for the Hugo Award for Best Novel as a result of the Sad Puppies campaign, and received an Audie Award in 2014. The second Dead Six novel, Swords of Exodus, was released in September 2013. Correia wrote a number of short stories and a novel in 2013 and 2014 for Privateer Press that were set in the Iron Kingdoms role-playing world.

Monster Hunter Nemesis (July 2014), the fifth volume in the main Monster Hunter series, was chosen as a finalist for the Hugo Award for Best Novel in 2015, but Correia declined the nomination. Correia began Saga of the Forgotten Warrior, a new epic fantasy series, with Son of the Black Sword (November 2015), which won an inaugural Dragon Award in the "Best Fantasy Novel" category in 2016. It was also nominated for the David Gemmell Legend Award and placed 9th in the voting for the Locus Award for Best Fantasy Novel in 2016.

A spin-off series set in the Monster Hunter universe—co-written with John Ringo—was started in August 2016 with Monster Hunter Memoirs. It is set about 30 years before the main series and follows the exploits of Oliver Chadwick Gardenier. The final book in the Dead Six trilogy, Alliance of Shadows, as well as Monster Hunter Memoirs: Sinners were released in October and December (respectively) that year. Monster Hunter Siege was released in August 2017, while Monster Hunter Memoirs: Saints was released in July 2018. House of Assassins was released in 2019. Monster Hunter Guardian, co-authored with Sarah A. Hoyt, was released in August 2019, and Monster Hunter Bloodlines was released in August 2021. The third book in the Saga of the Forgotten Warrior series, Destroyer of Worlds, was released in December 2020, and the fourth book Tower of Silence was released in April 2023 and fifth book Graveyard of Demons currently being worked on.

Outside of writing, Correia has been a guest on "Shooting Gallery", Joe Mantegna’s Gun Stories, and Huckabee talking about firearms. He and Steve Diamond also host a writing podcast called "The WriterDojo".

== Works ==
Correia is best known for his Monster Hunter International, Grimnoir Chronicles, and Saga of the Forgotten Warrior series. The Monster Hunter International series chronicles the fictional adventures of the employees of Monster Hunter International, a company that hunts vampires, werewolves, zombies, and other monsters in order to protect the general public from them. The existence of these monsters is suppressed by a secret governmental organization known as the Monster Control Bureau. As the MCB is too small to handle all the monster hunting, they place bounties on the various monsters, and companies like MHI receive those bounties after proving they have eliminated them. The main character is Owen Zastava Pitt, a former accountant whose boss turned into a werewolf and tried to kill him. After nearly dying while dispatching his boss, Owen is recruited into MHI.

The Grimnoir Chronicles is an alternate history fantasy series set in the 1930s. In the world of Grimnoir, magical abilities began manifesting in people in 1849. Most of those with magical abilities have very minor magic (about one in 100 people). About one in a thousand of those has major abilities and is known as an Active. The main character, Jake Sullivan, is a Heavy (he can manipulate gravity). He eventually joins the Grimnoir Society after finding the government is lying to him, working with them to stop the Imperium and the ambitions of Okubo Tokugawa.

In Saga of the Forgotten Warrior, Ashok is a Protector, warrior monks chosen to enforce the law and root out anyone who is practicing the old ways. He is very good at what he does, until he finds out he is not who he thinks he is, and that he's been lied to his entire life. He has to choose whether to hide the lies or to rebel against what he thought was right.

Larry Correia enjoys writing novels in different genres with other writers. His first novel collaboration was a thriller trilogy starting with Dead Six written with Mike Kupari. Correia has written Monster Hunter novels with John Ringo, Sarah A. Hoyt, and Jason Cordova. The hard space science fiction novel, Gun Runner, with John D. Brown. A military fantasy novel, Servants of War, with Steve Diamond.

== Awards and recognition ==
Year	Work	Award	Category	Result	Refs
2011	—	John W. Campbell Award	—	Shortlisted	
2012	Hard Magic	Audie Awards	Paranormal	Won	
2013	Spellbound	Audie Awards	Paranormal	Won	
2014	Warbound	Audie Awards	Paranormal	Shortlisted	
2014	Warbound	Hugo Award	Novel	Shortlisted	
2015	Dead Six	Audie Awards	Thriller/Suspense	Shortlisted	
2015	Monster Hunter Nemesis	Hugo Award	Novel	Shortlisted	
2016	Son of the Black Sword	Audie Awards	Fantasy	Shortlisted	
2016	Son of the Black Sword	David Gemmell Awards	Legend Award	Shortlisted	
2016	Son of the Black Sword	Dragon Award	Fantasy Novel	Won	
2016	Son of the Black Sword	Locus Award	Fantasy Novel	Nominated—9th	
2017	Monster Hunter Memoirs: Grunge	Dragon Award	Fantasy Novel	Won	
2019	House of Assassins	Dragon Award	Fantasy Novel	Won	
2021	Gun Runner	Dragon Award	Military Science Fiction or Fantasy Novel	Won	
