= Privateer Press =

Game publisher

Privateer Press Inc.
- Type: Privately held company
- Industry: Miniature wargaming
- Founded: 2000
- Founder: Brian Snoddy; Matt Staroscik; Matt Wilson
- Headquarters: Woodinville, WA, United States
- Key people: Sherry Yeary (President); Matt Wilson (CEO)
- Products: Iron Kingdoms; Warmachine; Hordes
- Owner: Matt Wilson
- Website: privateerpress.com

Privateer Press is a role-playing game, miniature wargame, acrylic paint, board game and card game production and publishing studio. Privateer Press is based in Bellevue, Washington, United States, where they have their headquarters and American factory/distribution center. They have also licensed a factory in the United Kingdom to increase production capacity for worldwide markets.

The company's signature products are Warmachine and Hordes, tabletop miniatures-based war games with a steampunk/magical aesthetic. Noted webcomic creators and game critics Jerry Holkins and Mike Krahulik of Penny Arcade are fans of Warmachine. Privateer Press used to publish a house magazine called No Quarter.

== History ==
In 2000, Matt Wilson and his friend Brian Snoddy formed Privateer Press with writer Matt Staroscik to publish their own d20 supplements. Mike McVey joined the partnership early on as Miniatures Director. Wilson and Snoddy produced the covers and interior art for Privateer's first Iron Kingdoms adventures published in 2001. The company is currently owned by Wilson due to the departure of Snoddy and McVey.

Privateer next published Warmachine: Prime (2003), a miniatures wargame taking place in the same Iron Kingdoms setting as the company's first five role-playing game supplements it had already published. In 2009 Privateer partnered with WhiteMoon Dreams to create an adaptation of Warmachine for video game consoles.

On October 20, 2017, Privateer Press created Black Anchor Heavy Industries, an in-house production team to manufacture large-scale models while controlling production costs.After 12 years of publication, the company announced the end of its bi-monthly "No Quarter" magazine in September 2018, In June 2024, Privateer Press sold the Warmachine, Formula P3, and Iron Kingdoms brands to Steamforged Games.

== Products ==
The company's products are distinguished by the quality of their art, production values, and game play. They have received many game industry awards, including six Origins Awards and numerous ENnies, including Best Publisher (Overall) in 2001.

=== List of titles ===
- Formula P3 (Privateer Press Paint) acrylic paint
- Privateer Press Masterworks painted statues
- Iron Kingdoms steampunk fantasy universe
  - Iron Kingdoms Role-Playing Games
  - Iron Kingdoms Adventure Board Games (2 Titles - Undercity and Widower's wood)
  - Warmachine & Hordes miniature wargames
  - Grind miniature sports game
  - High Command deck-building card games
  - Riot quest miniature skirmish board game in alternate timeline to the Warmachine post Obllivion event
  - Warcaster neo-mechanika high-speed miniatures game
- Bodgers family board and card games
  - Zombies Keep Out
  - BodgerMania
  - Heap
  - Infernal Contraption
  - Scrappers
- Level 7 science-fiction board games
  - Level 7 [Escape]
  - Level 7 [Omega Protocol]
  - Level 7 [Invasion]
- Monsterpocalypse collectible miniatures game
  - Monsterpocalypse: Voltron licensed standalone set

== Charitable contributions ==
The company has been a longtime supporter of Child's Play, a charity which gives toys and games to sick children in children's hospitals around the world. In 2009, Privateer Press bid on and won an item at the annual Child's Play Holiday auction, donated by Harmonix, which brought them the rights to commission a downloadable song track for the Rock Band video game. The resulting song "Warmachine," written by Jerry Holkins, premiered at Pax 2010 and was made available for download that fall. All proceeds from the track are also donated to Child's Play.
