= List of campaign settings =

This is a list of campaign settings published for role-playing games. Since role-playing games originally developed from wargames, there are many historical and alternate-history RPGs based on Earth. The settings for such games are excluded from this list, unless they include significant fictional elements.

Many RPG campaign settings are based on fictional universes from books, comics, video games, or films. Campaigns have been created for Star Wars, Lord of the Rings, Star Trek, and James Bond, for example.

== Fantasy campaigns ==
Campaign setting name	Subgenre	Setting location	Game system(s)	Publisher(s)	Period(s) published	Notes
Agone	High fantasy			Multisim	1999-2008	
Al-Qadim	Arabian fantasy	The continent Zakhara on planet Abeir-Toril	AD&D 2nd edition	TSR	1992-1998	
The Diamond Throne	Medieval fantasy		d20 System		2003	A giant-dominated setting; created by Monte Cook and first published in 2003.
Arcanis: the World of Shattered Empires	Medieval fantasy	The continent of Onara on the Planet of Arcanis	d20 System, Arcanis rules system, 5ed D&D	Paradigm Concepts	2001–Present	Focuses on moral ambiguity and politics
Ars Magica	Medieval fantasy, heroic fantasy	Mythic Europe	Ars Magica rules	Lion Rampant, White Wolf, Wizards of the Coast, Atlas Games	1987-2004	
Birthright	Medieval fantasy	The continent of Cerilia on the planet Aebrynis	AD&D 2nd edition, D&D 3rd edition	TSR	1994-2005	Players each run their own country, and vie economically, politically, and militarily with or against each other and the rest of the countries on the map.
Blackmoor	High fantasy	The planet Mystara	D&D	Judges Guild, TSR, Zeitgeist Games	1977-2009	First role-playing game campaign setting developed (1971-) for the purpose, later placed on Greyhawk, then on Mystara, then again relaunched as a standalone world
Blue Rose	Romantic fantasy	The planet Aldea	True20	Green Ronin Publishing	2005–present	
Council of Wyrms	High fantasy; Dragon-centric		AD&D 2nd edition	TSR	1994-1999	Players roleplay dragon characters
The Dark Eye	Sword and sorcery	Aventuria		Fantasy Productions, Ulisses Spiele	1984–present	Primarily in German
Dark Sun	Post-apocalyptic Sword and Sorcery	The planet Athas	AD&D 2nd edition, D&D 4th edition	TSR, WotC	1991-2010	
Discworld	High fantasy		GURPS Discworld	Steve Jackson Games	1998-2002	Based on Terry Pratchett's Discworld series
Dragonlance	High fantasy; Dragon-centric	The planet Krynn	AD&D, D&D 3rd edition, D&D 5th edition	TSR, Sovereign Press, Inc	1984–present	
Earthdawn	Sword and sorcery	province Barsaive		FASA	1993–present	
Eberron	High fantasy, Industrial fantasy, Pulp Fiction	The continent Khorvaire on the planet Eberron	D&D 3rd edition, D&D 4th edition, D&D 5th edition	WotC	2004–Present	Created by Keith Baker as the winner of a setting submission competition for D&D 3e. Made as a setting to adapt Dugeons and Dragons for stories inspired by steampunk, film noir, and pulp adventure. Distinctly set in an Interwar period analogous to the 1920's, 30's, and the Victorian colonial period.
Exandria	High fantasy	The continents of Tal'Dorei, Wildemount, and Eiselcross	D&D 5e	Green Ronin Publishing, WotC, Darrington Press	2015–Present	Originally created by Matthew Mercer for his personal Pathfinder campaign. It is now the setting for campaigns in the web series Critical Role and the spinoff web series Exandria Unlimited; it is also an official D&D setting.
Forcelia	High fantasy	The continent of Alecrast	D&D (not TSR's official), Record of Lodoss War, Sword World RPG, Legend of Crystania and Rune Soldier	Group SNE	1989–present	Primarily in Japanese.
Forgotten Realms	High fantasy	The continent of Faerûn on the planet Abeir-Toril	AD&D, AD&D 2nd edition, D&D 3rd/4th/5th edition	TSR, WotC	1987–present	Originally created as a paracosm by Ed Greenwood in 1967 to provide a setting for his childhood stories.
Garweeze Wurld	Sword and sorcery	The planet Aldrazar	Hackmaster 4th edition	Kenzer & Company	2001	Based on the main setting played by the characters of the Knights of the Dinner Table comic series. It is strongly characterized by Hackmaster's wuss slapping honor system, +12 swords, sidewinder fireballs, etc.
Glorantha	High Fantasy	The planet Glorantha	RuneQuest, Hero Wars, HeroQuest, 13th Age	Chaosium	1978–present	First introduced in White Bear and Red Moon board game in 1975.
Golarion	Multi-cultural Medieval fantasy	Pathfinder Chronicles	The planet of Pathfinder Roleplaying Game	Paizo Publishing	2008–present	Regions strongly similar to Europe, Arabia, and Africa
Greyhawk (aka World of Greyhawk)	High fantasy	The planet Oerth	AD&D	TSR, WotC	1980-2008	
Hackjammer	Sword and sorcery	The sky, Wildspace, the Phlogiston	Hackmaster 4th Edition	Kenzer & Company	2005	Parody of Spelljammer, and add-on to Garweeze Wurld
Hârn	Medieval fantasy	The planet Kethira	HârnMaster	Columbia Games	1986-2003	
Hollow World	Classical fantasy	Inside the planet Mystara	D&D	TSR	1990-1992	
Hyborian Age	Sword and sorcery	Earth during the Hyborian Age	Conan Role-Playing Game, GURPS Conan, Conan d20, Conan: The Roleplaying Game	TSR, Steve Jackson Games, Mongoose Publishing	1985, 1988-1989, 2004-2007	Based on Robert E. Howard's Conan stories
Iron Kingdoms	Gaslamp fantasy	Immoren		Privateer Press	2004-2013	
Jakandor	Sword and sorcery	Island of Jakandor	Advanced Dungeons & Dragons	Wizards of the Coast	1997-1998	The setting was released in the form of three books, as part of the Advanced Dungeons & Dragons: Odyssey line.
Kalibruhn	Sword and sorcery		Generic, d20 system	Creations Unlimited, Necromancer Games, Different Worlds	1987, 2001-2004	Developed by Robert J. Kuntz, who began running his own "Castle El Raja Key" campaign for Gary Gygax in 1973. His campaign world was known as Kalibruhn. Kuntz pulled in some elements of his own campaign into Greyhawk, and some levels of El Raja Key were merged into Castle Greyhawk.
Kara-Tur	Wuxia	The continent of Kara-Tur on planet Abeir-Toril	AD&D	TSR	1985-1990	Located on the same continent and Planet as Forgotten Realms and Al-Qadim. Created for the 1st edition of Oriental Adventures but not used for the 3rd edition product of the same name
Kingdoms of Kalamar	Sword and sorcery	The planet Tellene	D&D 3rd edition, HackMaster 5th edition	Kenzer & Company	1994-2008	
Lankhmar – City of Adventure	Sword and sorcery	The city of Lankhmar on the planet of Nehwon	AD&D	TSR, Inc.	1985-1992	
Legend of the Five Rings	Historical fantasy based on Bushido	Empire of Rokugan	D&D 3rd edition, L5R rules	Alderac Entertainment Group	1997-2010	Rokugan was previously used for the D&D 3rd edition Oriental Adventures
Matter of Britain	High fantasy	Mythological Great Britain and Brittany	Multiple, first used by Pendragon	Mythology, Setting is used by multiple RPGs	1985-present	A default setting for all RPGs taking place in the world of King Arthur, Merlin and Morgan le Fay.
Middle Earth	High fantasy		Middle-earth Role Playing (MERP) rules system, Lord of the Rings RPG (CODA System)	Iron Crown Enterprises (ICE), Decipher, Inc.	1984-1999, 2002-2006	
Multiverse (Magic: The Gathering)	Sword and sorcery	Multiple planes including Ravnica, Theros	D&D 5th edition	Wizards of the Coast	2005-present	The various planes from the Magic: The Gathering collectible card game.
Mystara	Sword and sorcery (early), high fantasy (late)	The planet Mystara	D&D	TSR	1981-1996	Originally referred to as the "Known World", Mystara first appeared in X1 Isle of Dread and Moldvay edition D&D Expert Set. Some earlier D&D Basic modules were integrated into the Mystara world.
Norrath	Sword and sorcery	The planet Norrath	EverQuest RPG	Verant Interactive and 989 Studios	2002-2006	
Numenera	Science fantasy	The Ninth World; a future Earth	the Cypher System	Monte Cook Games	2013–present	Nanites and technology from eight previous advanced civilizations litter the otherwise medieval Ninth World, and some beings can tap into these forces as mages of other fantasy settings could with magic.
The Old World	Sword and sorcery		Warhammer Fantasy Roleplay		1986-2009	A spin-off and a parallel universe to Warhammer Fantasy Battle miniature game
Palladium Fantasy	Sword and sorcery				1983–Present	
Planescape	Supernatural interdimensional fantasy	The Great Wheel, aka the Multiverse	AD&D 2nd edition	TSR	1994-1998	Interconnects campaigns via pathways and portals but also by providing opportunities for characters from different planes to meet in Heaven, Hell, and in the other planes on the Great Wheel.
Scarred Lands	post-apocalyptic fantasy	The planet Scarn	d20 System	Sword & Sorcery Studios (part of White Wolf Publishing)	2000–present	The rights were acquired in 2013 by Nocturnal Media and Onyx Path Publishing to revive the setting.
Shadow World	High fantasy	The planet Kulthea	Rolemaster	Iron Crown Enterprises	1987–present	
Spelljammer	Space opera	The sky, Wildspace, the Phlogiston	AD&D 2nd edition, D&D 5th edition	TSR	1989-1993	Solar systems contained within crystal spheres floating in the Phlogiston. Spelljammer interconnects other campaigns, by allowing characters to travel between crystal spheres.
Tékumel	Sword and sorcery	The planet Tékumel	Empire of the Petal Throne	TSR, Different Worlds Publications, Guardians of Order	1974-2005	The creation of this imaginary world originates in the 1940s. Original D&D in 1974 inspired its development as an RPG setting.
Théah	High fantasy	The continent Théah	7th Sea (role-playing game), (d20 System) (Swashbuckling Adventures)	Alderac Entertainment Group	1999 - Present	Modelled on historic Europe
Thieves' World	Sword and Sorcery	The city of Sanctuary, the Rankan Empire	Generic, Runequest 3rd edition, d20 system	Chaosium, FASA, Green Ronin	1981-1986, 2005-2007	Based on Thieves' World novels series.
Titan	Sword and sorcery	The continents of Allansia, Khul and the "Old World"	Fighting Fantasy RPG, Advanced Fighting Fantasy, d20 system	Puffin Books, Arion Games	1984-2014	Originally a setting for Fighting Fantasy game books since 1982.
Warcraft Universe	Sword and sorcery	Planets of Azeroth, Draenor and others	Warcraft: The Roleplaying Game (d20 System)	Blizzard Entertainment	2003-2005	
Westeros	High fantasy		A Game of Thrones RPG		2006-present	Based on the setting of American author George R. R. Martin, as featured in his series of high fantasy novels titled A Song of Ice and Fire.
The Wheel of Time	High fantasy		Wheel of Time RPG, d20 System	WotC	2001-2002	Based on an epic fantasy series by Robert Jordan.
Wilderlands of High Fantasy	High fantasy		Generic D&D, D&D 3rd edition	Judges Guild, Necromancer Games	1976-1983, 2004-2005	Better known as City State of the Invincible Overlord, it is the first ever published city setting for RPG and the surrounding world developed around it.
The Witcher	High fantasy	The Continent	Modified Interlock System (2018)	MAG (2001) R. Talsorian Games (2018)	2001, 2018	Based on an epic fantasy series by Andrzej Sapkowski. First game, dubbed Wiedźmin: Gra wyobraźni (The Witcher: A Game of Imagination), was published in Poland by MAG in 2001. Second game, The Witcher RPG, was published in 2018 by R. Talsorian Games.
World Tree RPG	High fantasy	the World Tree		Padwolf Publishing	2001	Focuses on the culture and social structure of anthropomorph animals and monsters in a surreal setting where the world is a large living tree
Castlemourn	Post-apocalyptic fantasy	Planet of Castlemourn	D&D 4th edition	Margaret Weis Productions	2006-2008	
DragonMech	Gaslamp fantasy	Planet of DragonMech	d20 System	Goodman Games, Sword & Sorcery Studios	2004-2006	
Eredane	Dark fantasy		d20 System	Fantasy Flight Games	2003-2009	
Ptolus	Gaslamp fantasy	Planet of Praemal	D&D 3rd edition	Malhavoc Press	2002-2009	
Urban Arcana	Gaslamp fantasy	Generic local setting	d20 Modern	Wizards of the Coast	2002-2003	Builds on a small campaign model and adds magic and monsters to the game, and rules for playing Shadowkind characters.
Uresia	anime fantasy	Planet of Uresia	Systemless, Big Eyes, Small Mouth	Guardians of Order	2003-2012	Written by S. John Ross.

- Diablo universe (set on the World of Sanctuary)
- Grimm
- Magnamund (the world the Lone Wolf d20 rpg takes place in)
- Midgard
- Alshard
- Dragon Fist
- Bushido (role-playing game)
- Creation is the name for the Exalted series of RPGs scenario.
- Weapons of the Gods

== Horror ==
- The Buffyverse (Buffy the Vampire Slayer/Angel)
- Chill
- The Chronicles of Darkness (White Wolf Publishing house setting introduced in the 2000s)
- Cthulhu Mythos
  - Delta Green (1990s/2000s)
  - CthulhuTech by Wildfire - H.P. Lovecraft's horror with Mecha and Anime influences
- Engel
- The Esoterrorists (contemporary occult conspiracy, using the Gumshoe System)
- The GURPS Cabal setting (contemporary monster conspiracy)
- Kult a nightmare universe parallel to our own, heavily influenced by gnosticism
- Little Fears where you play children haunted by horrors, supernatural or quite natural.
- Night's Black Agents contemporary horror/espionage, using the Gumshoe System
- Ravenloft (D&D)
  - Masque of the Red Death (1890s "Gothic Earth")
    - Living Death
- SLA Industries
- The Weird West (Deadlands)
- The World of Darkness (White Wolf Publishing house setting introduced in the 1990s)
- Unknown Armies (contemporary underground occult)
- Witchcraft
- Witch Hunter: The Invisible World
- The Yellow King (reality horror, using a modified Gumshoe System)

== Science fiction ==
Campaign setting name	Subgenre	Setting location	Game system(s)	Publisher(s)	Period(s) published	Notes
2300 AD	Space opera, hard science fiction		2300 AD (GDW House System), Mongoose Traveller	GDW, QuikLink Interactive, Mongoose Publishing	1986, 1988, 2007, 2012, 2022	Originally titled "Traveller: 2300 AD"
Alternity	Space opera			TSR, Inc.	1998	
Ashen Stars	Space opera		Gumshoe System	Pelgrane Press	2011	
Babylon 5	Space opera		d20 System			
BattleTech	Mecha	Inner Sphere		FASA, FanPro LLC, Catalyst Game Labs	1984-	Also known as Mechwarrior
Brigada Ligeira Estelar	Space opera			Editora Jambô	2012	This Brazilian game has Mecha and Anime influences
Blue Planet	Environmentalist	Watery planet of Poseidon		Biohazard Games, Fantasy Flight Games, RedBrick, FASA Games	1997, 2000, 2012, 2019	
Bubblegum Crisis	Cyberpunk	Megatokyo	Fuzion	R. Talsorian Games	1996	
Centauri Knights	Mecha		Big Eyes, Small Mouth	Guardians of Order	2003	
CthulhuTech	Techno horror					H.P. Lovecraft's horror with Mecha and Anime influences
Cyberpunk 2020	Cyberpunk	Night City, NorCal	Interlock System	R. Talsorian Games	1988, 1990, 2005, 2019	
Cyberspace	Cyberpunk	San Francisco	Spacemaster	Iron Crown Enterprises	1989, 1992	
Dark*Matter	conspiracy theory		Alternity	Wizards of the Coast	1999	
Dawning Star			d20 Future			
Dragonstar						
Doctor Who	Time travel	Whoniverse	Doctor Who RPG, Time Lord, Doctor Who: Adventures in Time and Space	FASA, Virgin Books, Cubicle 7	1985, 1991, 2009	
Eclipse Phase	Transhumanism, hard science fiction	The Solar System	Eclipse Phase	Catalyst Game Labs, Posthuman Studios	2009, 2017	
Engel						
Ex Machina	Cyberpunk		dX, d20	Guardians of Order	2004	Multiple settings
Fading Suns	Space opera					
Fallout	Post-apocalyptic alternate history	Post-apocalyptic US (The Commonwealth)	Modified SPECIAL using Modiphius's "2d20" system	Modiphius Entertainment	2021	
Fringeworthy						
Gaean Reach	Jack Vance		modified Gumshoe System	Pelgrane Press	2011	
Gamma World	Post-apocalyptic mutation sci-fi	Post-apocalyptic US (Lake Geneva, Wisconsin area)		TSR, WotC	1978-2010	Incorporated and expanded earlier title Metamorphosis Alpha
Gear Krieg	Alternate history		Silhouette, SilCore, D20	Dream Pod 9		
GURPS Infinite Worlds setting	parallel worlds		GURPS	Steve Jackson Games	1991–present	introduced in GURPS Time Travel
GURPS Planet of Adventure	Jack Vance		GURPS	Steve Jackson Games	2003	
GURPS Terradyne	Solar system		GURPS	Steve Jackson Games	1991	
Heavy Gear	Mecha	Terra Nova	Silhouette, SilCore, D20	Dream Pod 9	1995-2012	
Jovian Chronicles	Mecha	The Solar System	Interlock System, Silhouette, SilCore, D20	Dream Pod 9	1992-2005	
Mindjammer	Space opera, transhumanism	Commonality Space	Fate, Mongoose Traveller	Mindjammer Press	2014	Bears resemblance to Iain M. Banks' Culture
Serenity	Space Western	The Verse	Cortex System	Margaret Weis Productions, Ltd	2005	Based on the television series Firefly (TV series) and the film Serenity
Shadowrun	Cyberpunk fantasy			FASA	1989-	
Space: 1889	Steampunk			Games Designers Workshop, Heloograph, Inc., Clockwork publishing	1988-	
Spacemaster				Iron Crown Enterprises		
Star*Drive	Space opera		Alternity	TSR		Part of the Alternity RPG universe
Starfinder				Paizo	2017-	
Star Frontiers	Space opera	The Frontier Sector		TSR	1982	
Star Hero			Star Hero, expansion of Hero System	Hero Games		
Star Fleet Universe	Space opera		Prime Directive (role-playing game); GURPS Prime Directive			
Star Trek universe	Space opera		Star Trek: The RPG, Star Trek RPG (CODA System)	FASA, Decipher, Inc.	1982-1989, 2002	
Star Wars universe	Space opera	Star Wars expanded universe	SW:The RPG, SWRPG (WotC), SWRPG (Fantasy Flight)	West End Games, Wizards of the Coast, Fantasy Flight Games	1987–1999, 2000–2010, 2012-	
Stargate SG-1	Military science fiction		d20 System			
Transhuman Space	Transhumanist	The Solar System	GURPS Transhuman Space	Steve Jackson Games	2002-	
Traveller universe	Space opera	Charted space	Traveller, GURPS Traveller, Mongoose Traveller	GDW	1977-96, Steve Jackson Games, 1998-2010, Mongoose Publishing, others	
Tribe 8	Post-apocalyptic science fantasy	Post-apocalyptic Canada	Silhouette, SilCore, D20	Dream Pod 9	1998	

- Imperium (Dark Heresy/Rogue Trader/Deathwatch Warhammer 40K)
- MechWarrior
- Shatterzone
- Terra Incognita (role-playing game)

== Superhero ==
- Champions Universe uses Champions (role-playing game) rules.
- Continuum is the name for a setting that spans three games: Adventure! (pulp-era), Aberrant (contemporary supers) and Trinity (science-fiction).
- DC Universe had been licensed to the cancelled DC Heroes and DC Universe RPGs; the new DC Adventures RPG was released in late 2010.
- Freedom City (M&M)
- Godlike is set in World War II, and inspired a modern-day game in the same setting, Wild Talents.
- GURPS International Super Teams is the house setting for GURPS Supers
- Heroes Unlimited, Villains Unlimited and Aliens Unlimited use Palladium's Rule System.
- Marvel Universe had been licensed to the canceled Marvel Super Heroes, Marvel Universe Roleplaying Game and Marvel Adventure Game.
- META-4 (M&M)
- Mutant City Blues, a near-future superhero setting using the Gumshoe System
- Omlevex (Third-Party M&M)
- Watchmen, by Alan Moore, was released to the DC Heroes system.
- Wild Cards (uses GURPS or M&M)

== Multi-genre ==
- Castle Falkenstein (role-playing game): New Europa
- Deadlands
- Feng Shui (role-playing game)
- Over the Edge (role-playing game)
- Shadowrun
- Tails of Equestria
- TORG

== Comedy/satire ==
- Alpha Complex (Paranoia)
- Discworld (GURPS)
- Illuminati University (GURPS)

== See also ==
- Dungeons & Dragons campaign settings
- List of fictional universes
