= 2017 ENnie Award winners =

- Awarded for: Best role-playing games of previous year
- Country: United Kingdom & United States
- Presented by: Gen Con
- First award: 2001
- Website: Archive of 2017 ENNIE Awards

The following are the winners of the 17th annual ENnie Awards, held in 2017:

== Judges' Spotlight Winners ==
- Rippers Resurrected (Pinnacle Entertainment Group)– Stacy Muth
- The Ninja Crusade 2e (Third Eye Games)– Jakub Nowosad
- Tales from the Yawning Portal (Wizards of the Coast)– Kayra Keri Küpçü
- Coriolis – The Third Horizon (Free League Publishing)– Kurt Wiegel
- Broodmother Skyfortress (Lamentations of the Flame Princess)- Reece Carter

== List of gold and silver winners ==
| Category | Gold Winner | Silver Winner |
|---|---|---|
| Best Adventure | Blood in the Chocolate (Lamentations of the Flame Princess) | Doors to Darkness (Chaosium) |
| Best Aid/Accessory | Call of Cthulhu – Keeper's Screen Pack (Chaosium) | Kobold Guide to Plots & Campaigns (Kobold Press) |
| Best Art, Cover | Call of Cthulhu – Investigator Handbook (Chaosium) | Torment: Tides of Numenera — The Explorer's Guide (Monte Cook Games) |
| Best Art, Interior | Tales from the Loop – Roleplaying in the ’80s That Never Was (Free League Publishing) | S. Petersen's Field Guide to Lovecraftian Horrors (Chaosium) |
| Best Blog | Gnome Stew: The Gaming Blog | Age of Ravens |
| Best Cartography | Call of Cthulhu – Keeper's Screen Pack (Chaosium) | 7th Sea: Map of Théah (John Wick Presents) |
| Best Electronic Book | The Things We Leave Behind (Stygian Fox Publishing) | Hubris: A World of Visceral Adventure (DIY RPG Productions) |
| Best Family Game | Bubblegumshoe (Evil Hat) | Masks: A New Generation (Magpie Games) |
| Best Free Product | 7th Sea: Basic Rules (John Wick Presents) | City of Mist – Free PDF Starter Set (Son of Oak Game Studio) |
| Best Game | Tales from the Loop – Roleplaying in the ’80s That Never Was (Free League Publishing) | 7th Sea: Core Rulebook (John Wick Presents) |
| Best Miniature Product | Achtung! Cthulhu Skirmish: Servitors of Nyarlathotep (Modiphius Entertainment) | Dungeons & Dragons: Nolzur's Marvelous Miniatures (WizKids) |
| Best Monster/Adversary | S. Petersen's Field Guide to Lovecraftian Horrors (Chaosium) | Veins of the Earth (Lamentations of the Flame Princess) |
| Best Podcast | Ken and Robin Talk About Stuff | Spellburn |
| Best Production Values | Call of Cthulhu – 7th Edition Slipcase Set(Chaosium) | Unknown Armies Deluxe Set (Atlas Games) |
| Best RPG Related Product | Call of Cthulhu: The Coloring Book (Chaosium) | The ABCs of RPGs (Hunter Books) |
| Best Rules | 7th Sea: Core Rulebook (John Wick Presents) | Adventures in Middle-Earth Player's Guide (Cubicle 7 Entertainment) |
| Best Setting | Tales from the Loop – Roleplaying in the ’80s That Never Was (Free League Publishing) | The Dark Eye: Aventuria Almanac (Ulisses North America) |
| Best Supplement | Pulp Cthulhu (Chaosium) | 7th Sea: Pirate Nations (John Wick Presents) |
| Best Website | Tabletop Audio | Elven Tower, RPG articles and cartography website |
| Best Writing | Tales from the Loop – Roleplaying in the ’80s That Never Was (Free League Publishing) | Veins of the Earth (Lamentations of the Flame Princess) |
| Product of the Year | Tales from the Loop – Roleplaying in the ’80s That Never Was (Free League Publishing) | 7th Sea: Core Rulebook (John Wick Presents) |
| Fan's Choice for Best Publisher | Wizards of the Coast | Chaosium |
