= Scarred Lands =

Tabletop role-playing game campaign setting

Scarred Lands is a post-apocalyptic fantasy campaign setting in which characters live in a world recovering from a devastating war between gods and titans. Initially published by White Wolf Publishing under its Sword & Sorcery brand using the d20 System, Scarred Lands is now owned by Onyx Path Publishing. In 2017 Onyx Path Publishing released an updated version of the setting using the 5th Edition Open Game License system along with a version of the core setting book using the first edition of the Pathfinder Roleplaying Game rules. Scarred Lands draws inspiration from Greek mythology.

== Setting ==
Scarred Lands
- Publishers: White Wolf Publishing Onyx Path Publishing
- Publication: 2000 (Creature Collection, setting debut OGL 3.0), 2014 (Pathfinder), 2016 (5e OGL)
- Genres: Tabletop Roleplaying Game
- Systems: d20 system (2000), OGL 3.5 Compatible, Pathfinder First Edition, OGL 5e Compatible
- Players: 2-10

Scarred Lands is set on the world of Scarn in a post-apocalyptic era where the world is recovering from a horrific war between the Gods and Titans, which ended 150 years ago and left the land warped. The primary focus of the setting is the continent of Ghelspad, which was the site of numerous battles during the Divine War, also called the Titanswar by some people of Scarn.

Seeking a means to rid the world of the whimsical and dangerous titans, the gods - the children of the titans - decided to unite against their parents. Because the essence of the titans is inextricably bound to the world of Scarn due to their role as the world's creators, the gods were forced to incapacitate their parents instead of destroying them. Hacked to pieces, chained, or bound into geographic or celestial fixtures, the felled titans provide constant incentive for their worshipers to resurrect their masters. The divine peoples (those who fought alongside the gods in the Divine War) and the Redeemed (those who fought alongside the titans, but renounced their titanic masters at the end of the Divine War) continue the fight against titanic abominations including both titan-worshipers and monstrous titanspawn.

A great deal of the setting's appeal comes from the detail of cultures, cities, governments and history presented in the core setting books and their supplements. Apart from Ghelspad, where the primary books are set, there are several other continents which have been influenced in a lesser degree by the Titanswar.

Since the reintroduction of the setting, supplemental materials have been released detailing regions beyond Ghelspad. These include the Blood Sea, which is tainted red by the corrupt blood of the titan Kadum, who lies chained and mutilated on the ocean floor, as well as the continent of Fenrilik, an arctic environment where titan worship is common and the extreme weather prevents most contact with the outside world.

=== Titans ===
In the game structure, Titans have neither alignment, nor domains. Titans as described through the game embody raw natural and universal power. Druids of Scarn draw on this power to fuel their magic. All titans but Denev, who sided with the gods, were targeted and incapacitated during the Divine War. As a result, druids who revere any titan other than Denev are reviled and considered titanspawn by the divine and Redeemed peoples.

- Denev, the Earth Mother
- Chern, The Scourge
- Gaurak, the Glutton
- Golthagga, the Shaper
- Golthain, the Faceless
- Gormoth, the Writhing Lord
- Gulaben, Lady of the Winds
- Hrinruuk, the Hunter
- Kadum, the Mountainshaker
- Lethene, Dame of Storms
- Mesos, Sire of Sorcery
- Mormo, Mother of Serpents
- Thulkas, Father of Fire

==== Lesser Titans ====
The existence of lesser titans is introduced and discussed in the Gauntlet of Spiragos adventure and its sequels. While Spiragos is discussed in some detail, including the tale of their destruction at the hands of Vangal the Ravager, little comment is made regarding the identities and abilities of other lesser titans.

=== Gods ===
While the Titans are kin to raw and universal power, the children of the Titans are not. Being a generation away from spontaneous birth is enough to limit the child to godhood in this game setting.

Each God was presented game statistics in the d20 System version, using the established rules for gods and NPCs, having both alignment and domains. This is also true of the Titan Denev who supported the gods in their war. No official statistics have been released for the gods or titans in the Open Gaming License or Pathfinder editions.

Another difference in the Scarred Lands setting, from other worlds using the d20 System, is the interaction, and 'awareness' of the Gods by the populations of the sentient beings. Like the land itself, the gods and titans are both major influences of the game. Blacksmiths for example invoke the name of Corean while they work. This in itself may not be different, for game purposes each round that the worshiper invokes his name a +1 may be added to die rolls for: Craft or Profession if the act involves blacksmithing, forging, or the creation of weapons. Other benefits are also described in the Scarred Lands Campaign Setting: Ghelspad book, and in The Divine and the Defeated published by White Wolf Publishing.

- Corean, the Avenger—LG: Fire, Good, Law, Protection, War
- Madriel, the Redeemer—NG: Air, Good, Healing, Plant, Sun
- Tanil, the Huntress—CG: Animal, Chaos, Luck, Plant, Travel, Trickery
- Hedrada, the Lawgiver—LN: Judgment, Knowledge, Law, Protection
- Enkili, the Trickster—CN: Air, Chaos, Luck, Travel, Trickery
- Chardun, the Slaver—LE: Domination, Evil, Law, Strength, War
- Belsameth, the Slayer—NE: Death, Evil, Magic, Trickery
- Vangal, the Reaver—CE: Chaos, Destruction, Evil, Strength, War
- Denev, the Earth Mother—TN: Air, Animals, Earth, Fire, Plants, Water (Denev Is actually a Titan, but fought alongside the gods in the Titanswar, and can be worshipped as a goddess)

=== The Land ===
While many role-playing game systems work with weather types and terrain difficulties, the Scarred Lands system brings in the aspect of land through various encounter modifiers and systems. The d20 System version covered two continents, Ghelspad and Termana, in individual setting books. Three additional continents were collected in the final book published under the original system. These are Asherak, the Dragon Isles, and Fenrilik.

Ghelspad is temperate. Termana is tropical. Asherak is desert. Fenrilik is arctic.

Supplements for the 5th Edition Open Game License system and the Pathfinder Roleplaying Game versions of the rules have continued this trend, with extensive rules regarding weather conditions, terrain, and hazards for players to overcome and endure.

== Novels ==
The Dead God Trilogy by Richard Lee Byers comprises the titles Forsaken, Forsworn, and Forbidden. It recounts the story of an elf (Vladawen Titanslayer) and his companions as they try to deliver their people from a devastating curse by resurrecting the high elven god killed during the Divine War by the titan Chern the Scourge.

Vigilant: Through Shadows and Dreams by Sarah L. Stewart and Frances Stewart was released in 2018 to support the new edition of the game. This novel tells the story of "brave, driven Veshian vigilants who stand between a recovering nation and the poisoned, half-mad wilds of Ghelspad. Learn the story behind the Scarred Lands’ dramatic Serpent saga, one of the most significant events of the post-war era."

== Scarred Lands revival ==
On October 11, 2013 Nocturnal Media and Onyx Path Publishing purchased the rights to the Scarred Lands fantasy setting. Onyx Path Publishing posted this on their website. "The Scarred Lands was one of the most successful and engaging campaign settings to arise during the wild and crazy days of the D20 license. While it is richly detailed in over two dozen game and fiction titles, Nocturnal Media and Onyx Path Publishing have plans to reimagine the setting and system to excite a modern gaming audience as well as to thrill fans of the original game."

After a successful crowdfunding campaign in 2016 and the release of Gauntlet of Spiragos as an introductory adventure that same year, the setting was released anew in 2017 with core rule books supporting both the 5th Edition Open Game License system and the Pathfinder Roleplaying Game rules. Initial supplements generated through the crowdfunding campaign were also released under both systems. With the release of the second edition of the Pathfinder Roleplaying Game, Onyx Path Publishing focused all further Scarred Lands publications strictly on the 5th Edition Open Game License system.

After the passing of Stewart Wieck in 2017, Onyx Path Publishing acquired the full rights to Scarred Lands from Nocturnal Media.

=== Creature Collection 5e ===
In 2020, Onyx Path Publishing, working in association with Handiwork Games led by ex-Cubicle 7 creative director Jon Hodgson, released Creature Collection 5e, updating several creatures from the d20 System era to the 5th Edition Open Game License system. John Hodgson stated, "Our main task is to convert the various Creature Collections, of which there have been many volumes over the years, we're kind of taking the best bits and building a bestiary for Fifth Edition." Creature Collection 5e "presents more than 175 creatures from the Scarred Lands setting, each painstakingly updated to work perfectly with the 5th Edition rules, each illustrated in full color."

=== Dead Man's Rust ===
In 2022, following a successful crowdfunding campaign, Onyx Path Publishing released Dead Man's Rust. Described by the developer as "a campaign suitable for new or existing characters that takes place throughout the Hornsaw Forest region of central Ghelspad." Dead Man's Rust provides an adventure that encompasses a large region of the continent of Ghelspad and contains tables, charts, and challenges to reflect the unique nature of the corrupted lands of the Hornsaw Forest. Inclusive representation among the non-player characters was one of the stated goals of the book, with several canonically LGBTQIA+ characters presented throughout the book. Author Frances Stewart proclaims "the setting is inclusive from the ground up."

==== Antagonists ====
The principal antagonists in Dead Man's Rust are the necromancers of Glivid-Autel, "built on top of a 1500 foot high mesa that was once a temple to some forgotten god. The necromancers of Glivid-Autel went there when they were exiled from Hollowfaust." While Hollowfaust is "city-state built from the ruins of an ancient civilization and governed by lawful, sophisticated necromancers." the evil and exploitative Glivid-Autel employed rituals and techniques forbidden by the lawful and civil Hollowfaustians.

==== Plot ====
Promotional materials describe Dead Man's Rust as a story in which "The necromancers of Glivid-Autel sew corruption and death throughout the Hornsaw Forest. Legionnaires, elves, and dwarves go missing. A horrific infection appears, seeming to target the legionnaires. The people of Broadreach call upon the adventurers to stand against these foul machinations that threaten peace, prosperity, and life itself across central Ghelspad. The party may find allies in the Broadreach Horizon, the Gleaming Valley, and perhaps even the bloody canopies of the Hornsaw Forest, if they are brave enough to answer the call to adventure!"

This tale begins in the city of Leoni, which is the capital of the Manticora Confederacy, a newly formed nation of the Manticora peoples. The Manticora "are semi-nomadic, so permanent settlement in the city is only now becoming more frequent." However, they are already beginning to form traditions, such as the Night of Chronicles, which is a festival where bards gather to share stories and festival goers can compete in various events. It is here that the party meets Dradoki Bronzeleaf, a Broadreach Dwarf seeking escort to the city of Freehome, "a beacon of hope and a bastion of safety for the dwarven people. Freehome is also a monument to the bond between the elves and dwarves of the Broadreach." This task is the primary means of entry for players to access the adventure, though several other options are provided in the book's Introduction to allow alternate methods of introducing players to the campaign events.

==== Expanded Player Options ====
In addition to the story elements, monsters, and non-player characters, Dead Man's Rust includes new playable character options such as the Animator wizard, which focuses on raising undead servants, the Hornsaw Sentinel ranger who gains a Hornsaw Unicorn animal companion, and the Ragewitch Barbarian who can cast and maintain spells while raging. New magic items and spells are also introduced.

==== Actual Play Streams ====
Actual Play content has been produced to support Dead Man's Rust, including releases from Onyx Path Publishing's official Twitch channel Red Moon Roleplaying and an ongoing stream from Devil's Luck Gaming entitled Rust & Remains

== See also ==
- Scarred Lands Gazetteer: Ghelspad
