= Engel - Corebook =

Engel - Corebook is a 2002 role-playing game supplement published by Sword and Sorcery Studios for Engel.

== Contents ==
Engel - Corebook is a supplement in which 27th century Europe is in a new dark age.

== Publication history ==
Shannon Appelcline noted that "Perhaps the most unusual d20 book published directly by White Wolf was Engel Corebook (2002), a very early OGL-licensed release that took a German post-apocalyptic fantasy game published by Feder & Schwert (think: Tribe 8) and converted it to d20. It was notable as a rare German game that (sort of ) made it to the American market but ultimately failed because of a lack-luster d20 conversion."

== Reviews ==
- Pyramid
- Backstab
