= Creature Collection =

Creature Collection is a 2000 role-playing game supplement published by Sword and Sorcery Studios.

== Contents ==
Creature Collection is a supplement in which a bestiary introduced over 200 new monsters while offering the first glimpse of the Scarred Lands through its gods‑versus‑titans mythology.

== Publication history ==
Shannon Appelcline explained how after announcing their partnership with Necromancer Games, "White Wolf produced the first Sword & Sorcery book almost immediately. The Creature Collection (2000) was a book of monsters – which was really not the sort of directly competitive product that Ryan Dancey had intended when he created the OGL but exactly the sort of thing that an adept publisher like White Wolf wanted to put out to make a big splash in the d20 market. Clark Peterson and Bill Webb of Necromancer Games put Creature Collection together but the writing came from White Wolf. The book’s large array of authors included many familiar names, such as Andrew Bates, Ken Cliffe, Mike Tinney, Steve Wieck and Stewart Wieck. Creature Collection was cheekily labelled a 'core rulebook', matching the dress and style of Wizards of the Coast's third-edition Dungeons & Dragons rules."

Appelcline also noted that "Creature Collection was more than just a monster book. It also offered up the first view of a setting that White Wolf would detail throughout their d20 releases: the 'Scarred Land', a post-apocalyptic fantasy world, set 150 years after a war among Greek-influenced gods. Those publications would form the second element of White Wolf's d20 strategy." Appelcline also explained that in 2008, "White Wolf licensed the Sword & Sorcery trademark and the Scarred Lands setting to their old partner, Fiery Dragon, who has since published Creature Collection Fourth Edition (2009)."

== Reviews ==
- Backstab #32 (as "Encyclopédie Monstrueuse")
- Realms of Fantasy
- Polyhedron #145
- Dragon (German Issue 13 - Mar/Apr 2001)
