= Particle accelerators in popular culture =

Particle accelerators in popular culture appear in popular science books, fictional literature, feature films, TV series and other media which include particle accelerators as part of their content. Particle physics, fictional or scientific, is an inherent part of this topic.

== In popular science ==
=== The God Particle ===
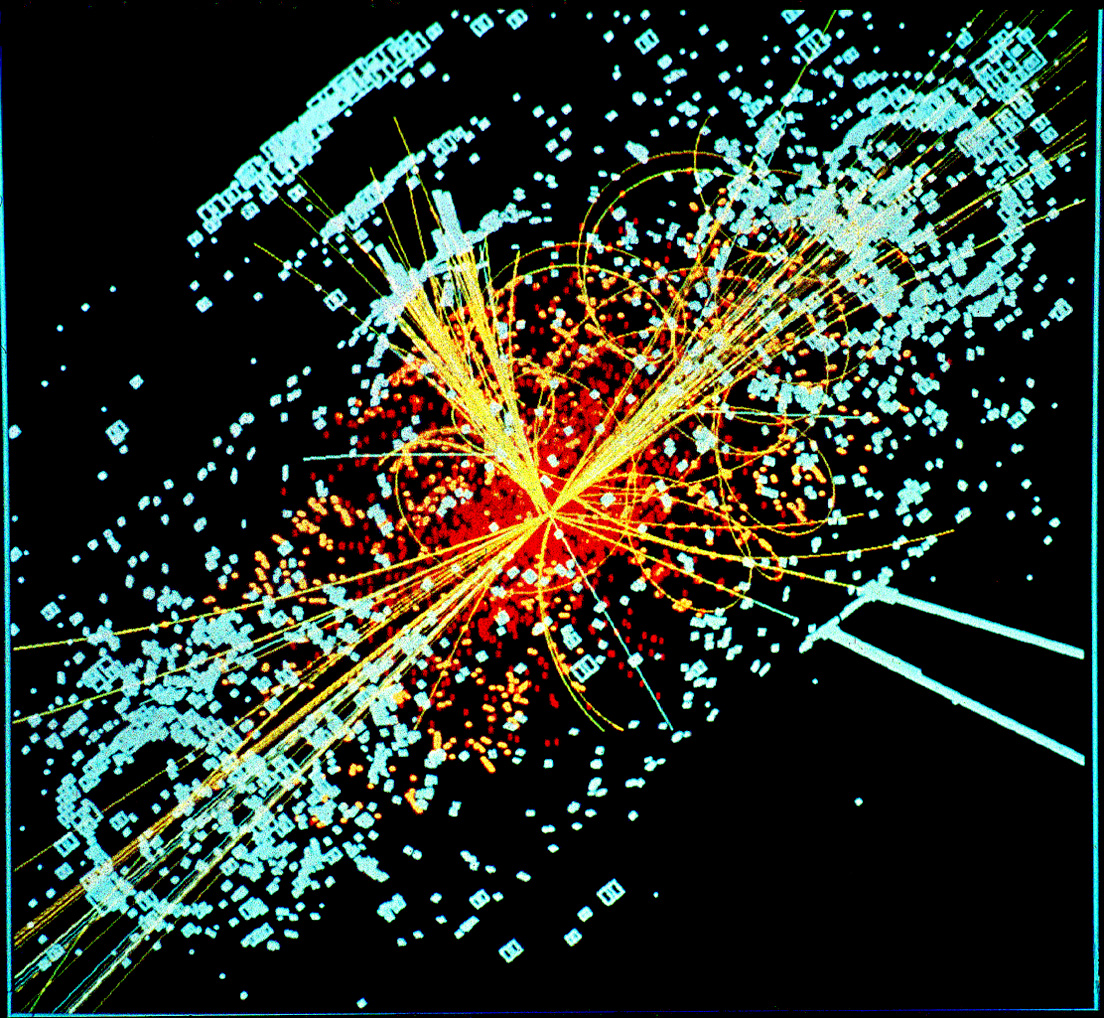
A simulated event in the CMS detector, featuring the appearance of the Higgs boson

The God Particle: If the Universe Is the Answer, What Is the Question? is a 1993 popular science book by Nobel Prize-winning physicist Leon M. Lederman and science writer Dick Teresi. This book was very popular, a New York Times, bestseller, which introduced the public to an overview of the science of Particle physics.

It provides a brief history of particle physics, starting with the Pre-Socratic Greek philosopher Democritus, and continuing through Isaac Newton, Roger J. Boscovich, Michael Faraday, and Ernest Rutherford. This leads into a discussion of the development of quantum physics in the 20th century. In a nod to the philosophy of atomism, Lederman follows the convention of using the word "atom" to refer to atoms in their modern sense as the smallest unit of any chemical element, and "a-tom" to refer to the actual basic indivisible particles of matter, the quarks and leptons.

=== Richard Feynman books ===
==== Surely You're Joking, Mr. Feynman! ====
Surely You're Joking, Mr. Feynman! is an edited collection of reminiscences by the Nobel Prize-winning physicist Richard Feynman. The book, released in 1985, covers a variety of instances in Feynman's life. Some are lighthearted in tone, such as his fascination with safe-cracking, fondness for topless bars, and ventures into art and samba music. Others cover more serious material, including his work on the Manhattan Project (during which his first wife Arline Greenbaum died of tuberculosis) and his critique of the science education system in Brazil.

==== The Feynman Lectures on Physics ====
The Feynman Lectures on Physics is a 1964 physics textbook by Richard Feynman, Robert B. Leighton and Matthew Sands, based upon the lectures given by Feynman to undergraduate students at the California Institute of Technology (Caltech) in 1961–63. It includes lectures on mathematics, electromagnetism, Newtonian physics, quantum physics, and even the relation of physics to other sciences. Six readily accessible chapters were later compiled into a book entitled Six Easy Pieces: Essentials of Physics Explained by Its Most Brilliant Teacher, and six more in Six Not So Easy Pieces: Einstein's Relativity, Symmetry and Space-Time.

The first volume focuses on mechanics, radiation, and heat. The second volume is mainly on electromagnetism and matter. The third volume, on quantum mechanics, shows, for example, how the double-slit experiment contains the essential features of quantum mechanics.

=== Large Hadron Collider ===
The Large Hadron Collider has created a niche in popular culture. From real science, which includes the mystery of the Higgs particle, to justifications for the cost, and to a thwarted cyber attack, the LHC has received a lot of press. It has also been the inspiration for popular fictional works. See fictional sections below.

== In fictional literature ==
=== Angels & Demons ===
The novel Angels & Demons, by Dan Brown, involves antimatter created at the LHC to be used in a weapon against the Vatican.

=== Firstborn ===
In the novel Firstborn, by Arthur C. Clarke. the alephtron is described as a particle accelerator wrapping around the lunar equator.

=== Flashforward ===
The novel FlashForward, by Robert J. Sawyer, involves the search for the Higgs boson at the LHC. CERN published a "Science and Fiction" page interviewing Sawyer and physicists about the book and the TV series based on it.

=== Timescape ===
Timescape is a 1980 novel by Gregory Benford (with unbilled co-author Hilary Foister). It won the 1980 Nebula and British Science Fiction Awards, This novel involves using time travel to avert ecological disasters.

=== Cosm ===
In Cosm by Gregory Benford, a quark–gluon plasma is created in a particle accelerator. It becomes a separate universe which evolves from its big-bang to its end in a brief period.

=== Black Hole ===
By Angelo Paratico, published in Italy by Mursia in 2007. A group of physicists try to stop the LHC but fail and a micro black hole is formed. It gradually swallows our planet.

== In feature films ==
=== Ghostbusters and Ghostbusters 2 ===
The Ghostbusters proton packs are also called particle throwers or unlicensed particle accelerators. Particle acceleration is used to lasso the ghosts for easy entrapment.

=== Iron Man 2 ===
Iron Man 2 features a makeshift particle accelerator used by Tony Stark to create a new chemical element, more biologically inert than the palladium used in the arc reactor.

=== Angels & Demons ===
The movie version of the book has footage filmed on-site at one of the experiments at the LHC; the director, Ron Howard, met with CERN experts in an effort to make the science in the story more accurate.

=== Terminator 3: Rise of the Machines ===
Terminator 3: Rise of the Machines features a particle accelerator that traps the metallic T-X Terminatrix in its powerful electromagnetic field, buying time for the protagonists to get a head start in their escape.

== In TV series ==
=== FlashForward ===
FlashForward was an American science-fiction television series which aired for one season on ABC. It was loosely based on the 1999 novel Flashforward by Canadian science fiction writer Robert J. Sawyer. It ran from September 24, 2009, through May 27, 2010.

=== The Adventures of the Galaxy Rangers ===
The Adventures of the Galaxy Rangers episode "Trouble at Texton" featured a particle accelerator on the moon Texton, operated by a mad scientist determined to prove the existence of parallel universes.

=== The Sparticle Mystery ===
A particle accelerator is the cause of the adults disappearing in the CBBC science fiction drama, The Sparticle Mystery.

=== Terra Nova ===
In Terra Nova the rift in spacetime that allows time travel is a natural phenomenon discovered by scientists working at Fermilab. Hope Plaza, the facility holding the time portal has two large semicircles in its structure, presumably the accelerator itself.

=== The Flash (2014 TV series) ===
In the 2014 TV series The Flash, scientist Harrison Wells (portrayed by Tom Cavanagh) creates a particle accelerator. The accelerator is not successful and explodes, releasing dark matter that transforms many people into metahumans (humans with superpowers).

=== Eureka (2006 TV series) ===
The most episodes of Eureka contain a reference to the particle accelerator.

=== Evil (2020 TV series) ===
In the first episode of season 4 of the TV series Evil, the characters are investigating a particle accelerator. The events of that episode are mentioned several times throughout the season.

== In video games ==
=== Another World ===
In the 1991 video game Another World, the intro shows the player working with a particle accelerator. His laboratory is struck by lightning during an experiment and the particle accelerator malfunctions, teleporting him to an alien world.

=== Satisfactory ===
In the game Satisfactory, player gets access to the particle accelerator, which is used for special production purposes, such as plutonium production. It can also be used to produce so called "nuclear pasta" - a dense matter believed to exist naturally within neutron stars.

=== Scribblenauts ===
In the 2009 video game Scribblenauts, the Large Hadron Collider creates a black hole.

=== Xenoblade Chronicles ===
In Xenoblade Chronicles 2, Klaus inadvertently devastates his universe while trying to use a particle accelerator to create a new universe. The remains of Klaus' home universe become Alrest, the setting of Xenoblade Chronicles 2. The universe Klaus created becomes the setting of Xenoblade Chronicles.

== In table top and role playing games ==
=== Tales from the Loop ===
A huge underground particle accelerator known as the Loop is both a major plot point in, and a key element of the lore behind, this 2017 alternate history RPG table top game.
