= Engel (role-playing game) =

Tabletop role-playing game

- Designers: Oliver Graute, Oliver Hoffmann, Kai Meyer
- Publishers: Sword & Sorcery Studios
- Publication: 2002
- Genres: Role-playing
- Systems: d20 System; Arcana (German edition only)

Engel (German for angel or angels) is a role-playing game. The original German version uses a rule system in which the gamemaster and players draw associative, tarot-like cards instead of rolling dice to determine the outcome of an event (this system is called the Arcana system in the original German version). The English version of Engel does not include the Arcana system at all; it is based on the d20 System instead. The German version includes d20 rules in addition to the Arcana system. The game was published by the German publisher Feder&Schwert (German for "Feather&Sword"), who also published the World of Darkness RPG series in Germany and used to publish the Dungeons & Dragons series.

== Setting ==
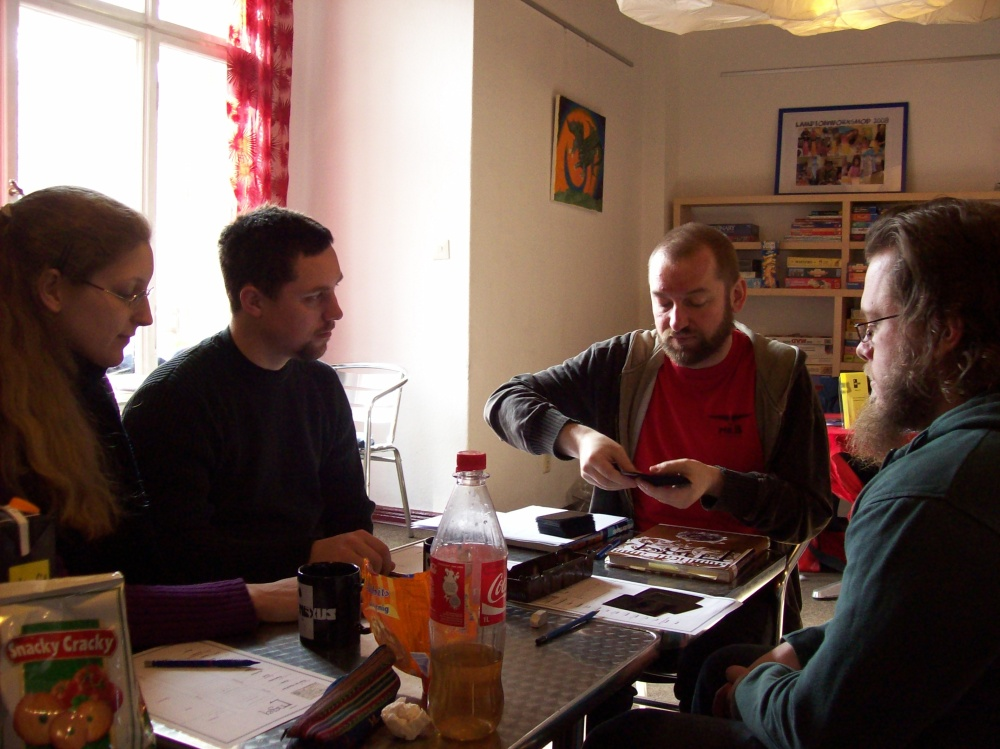
Engel-role playing round at the Burg-Con in Berlin 2009

In the flooded, quasi-medieval Europe of 2654, massive islands are the domains of the orders of the Angelitic Church. The Engel, seemingly the angels of Judeo-Christian belief, patrol the skies from their fortresslike Heavens, ceaselessly striving to defend the people of Europe against the hordes of the verminous [Dreamseed]. The eternally youthful Pontifex Maximus in Roma Æterna, in Italy, presides over a bureaucratic and autocratic church, having combined religious and secular power into a perfectly integrated whole. Within its dominion, dark riders take a tithe of every village's children for the unknown purposes of the church. Many of the cities have broken away from the direct command of the Church, coming under the sway of Junklords (Diadoches) who keep alive what remains of antediluvian technology. In the face of very real and very quantifiable evil, the people of Europe increasingly turn away from the direct political, cultural, and spiritual leadership of the church. As the numbers of the Engel plateau, players must navigate politics, war, and faith as the guardians of Europe.

=== Angelic Orders ===
Five orders of angels serve mankind and the Angelic Church in Roma Æterna. The Michaelites are the leaders of the hosts; the Urielites are the messengers of the Lord; the Gabrielites are the angels of death; the Ramielites are the keepers of knowledge; and the Raphaelites are the divine healers.

The Order of Michael
Named after the archangel Michael, the members of this order are trained in the arts of strategy, tactics and leadership. With their unique mental powers, they are the perfect commanders of the heavenly hosts. Like the archangel himself, the Michaelites are deemed the purest and most godlike of all angels. Their crest features a radiant crown and a key.
The Heaven of the Michaelites stands in Roma Æterna. Their traditional color is gold.

The Order of Uriel
Named after the archangel Uriel, this order keeps the knowledge of the ways of the Lord. The Urielites are the scouts and messengers among the angels. As such, their gift enables them to find their way even in the dark of night or in the middle of a thunderstorm. They are also very capable foragers, and can find food and water in the loneliest desert. The all-seeing eye is their crest.
The Heaven of the Urielites has been erected in Mont Salvage in the Pyrenees. Their colour is green.

The Order of Gabriel
Named after the archangel Gabriel, this angelic order is the most widely feared. These warriors of God, also called the angels of death, are trained to fight and kill in every imaginable way. With the flaming sword, which is also the symbol of the order, they deal out the Lord's judgment.
The Heaven of the Gabrielites is located near the ancient German town of Nürnberg. The colour of their order is black.

The Order of Ramiel
This order follows the archangel Ramiel or Jeremiel. The Ramielites are the keepers of knowledge and the sages among the other orders. Their divine gift lets them see the past as well as the future. Their crest is the book and the alpha and omega.
The Heaven of the Ramielites is located in the ancient Czech town of Prague, the new Venice of the east. The colour of their order is blue.

The Order of Raphael
This order, named after the archangel Raphael, is accustomed to the ways of healing. A touch of their hands can soothe pain, heal wounds, and even banish misery. Many Raphaelites refrain from violence completely and do not even carry weapons. Their crest shows the healing hand.
The Heaven of the Raphaelites is located near Grenoble in the French Alps. Their colour is white or silver.

== Mechanics ==
The book follows the standard d20 System convention of six primary statistics, classes, levels, experience points, feats, and skills. Normal humans have access to only the aristocrat, commoner, expert, fighter, rogue, and warrior classes. The Engel have access to special classes and abilities restricted to their bands; unlike humans, they are incapable of multiclassing. There is no magic; there are only Potestas (powers), which work as skills restricted by the Engelic band the player chooses. Such powers drain the hit points of the Engel; a similar but less harmful mechanic is found in the Star Wars d20 Roleplaying Game.

All core mechanics are included, in abbreviated form, in the Engel - Corebook. Equipment of the quasi-medieval setting of Engel is described, along with rules for pre-Flood artifacts such as firearms, grenades, and ceramic armor. A small selection of NPCs and sample player characters is provided, along with a map of the new Europe and a more-or-less complete history of the World of Engel since the Flood. Certain sections are explicitly forbidden for players to read, as they contain spoilers about the overall plot. Nonhuman NPCs (the Dreamseed creatures) are only briefly detailed though frequently mentioned; they are detailed in the supplement Creatures of the Dreamseed, released in 2002.

== Publication status ==
Described by Shannon Appelcline as "Perhaps the most unusual d20 book published directly by White Wolf was Engel Corebook (2002), a very early OGL-licensed release that took a German post-apocalyptic fantasy game [...] previously published by Feder & Schwert and converted it to d20." Appelcline stated that "It was notable as a rare German game that (sort of) made it to the American market, but ultimately failed because of a lack-luster d20 conversion." Appelcline went on to say that "White Wolf's Engel Corebook (2000) had been the first real look at a German RPG in the US — except that White Wolf converted it to d20, which probably removed much of its novelty. Unfortunately, FanPro's The Dark Eye didn't make any waves either, perhaps because it was a fairly traditional FRPG. As a result, FanPro only supported the game with two supplements."

Engel is no longer being actively supported by Sword & Sorcery Studios and the line was dropped in 2004, although copies of the Corebook are available in their online store. Creatures of the Dreamseed is not in stock and is only available through third parties.

A graphic novel set in the world of Engel, Pandoramicum, details some of Engel's history leading up to the current events in the Engel Corebook. It too is out of print.

Order Book: Michaelites, a supplement detailing one of the orders of Engel, was also released prior to the product line's cancellation. It is no longer in stock.

The 2001 album Engel by the English duo In the Nursery was commissioned by Feder&Schwert as an album of music inspired by the game.

== Reviews ==
- Envoyer (German) (Issue 62 - Dec 2001)
