= 7th Sea (collectible card game) =

1999 collectible card game

- Card back logo
- Designers: Dan Verssen
- Publishers: Alderac Entertainment Group
- Players: 2
- Playing time: Approx 45 min
- Chance: Some
- Skills: Card playing Arithmetic; Basic Reading Ability

7th Sea is an out-of-print collectible card game (CCG) first designed by Dan Verssen and published by Alderac Entertainment Group (AEG) from 1999 to 2002.

Its theme is swashbuckling nautical adventure found in classic stories like Treasure Island. It is set in the world of Théah shared with the 7th Sea tabletop role-playing game.

== Setting ==
In the 7th Sea CCG, players take the role of naval captains in the fantasy-Restoration world of Théah. The game attempted to capture the feeling of a Hollywood pirate battle, complete with huge galleys, cannon-shot exchanges, and daring sea boardings. The game also has aspects of adventuring, treasure seeking, and the occult.

As with most of the games of AEG, 7th Sea had a complex storyline that affected and was influenced by the RPG setting. The results of tournaments would function to guide the storyline, and the storyline in turn would be used to create new cards.

== Basics ==
The game had many interesting concepts, including multiple winning conditions and a unique swashbuckling-themed combat system. The most important aspects were deck building, rules, and storyline.

=== Terms ===
The game used a number of terms to describe elements of game play:

- Faction: The many factions in the game corresponded either to the navies of Théah's different nations, pirates, or other independent fleets. Almost every crew character belonged to a faction, though some were unaligned and thus available to be used by any player.
- Captain: The leading character on a ship and most important crewmember. Captains followed special rules and were often central to the faction's storyline.
- Ship: There were many ships with various abilities. Each player would use one ship for the entire game, as well as one captain and crew. Faction ships could only be used with a captain of the corresponding faction, while unaligned ships were available to anyone.
- Crew: The rest of a ship's characters. A player could build a crew from all factions but the starting crew could not consist of a faction distinct from the ship.
- Seas: The environment of the ship. Five pre-constructed cards delineated the game space.
- Tack: When a card's ability was used for the turn, it was turned sideways and could not be used again. This was called 'tacking.' Tacking also resulted from damage.

=== Cards ===
The six types of cards in 7th Sea were: Actions, Crew, Adventures, Attachments, Chanteys and Ships. Each card is played differently as explained below.

==== Crew ====
The most important card type in 7th Sea is Crew. This card type combines the traditional CCG concepts of both a resource type and a creature type. Most CCGs use some kind of card type to produce resources that they subsequently use to gain other items. Usually those resources do not contribute to anything else. Examples of this are lands from Magic: The Gathering and holdings from Legend of the Five Rings. Most games also have some kind of creature card that provides offence and defense, like M:TG's creatures and Doomtown's Dudes. The game combined both while also providing multiple resource types and multiple combat procedures.

Crew members are the sailors hired to operate the ship. The captain is also considered a member of the crew, though they hold a specific leadership role and perform distinct duties alongside the rest of the team.

Crew cards have the following statistics:

  - Cost: This is the amount of Influence (a type of resource, much like 'mana' in Magic: the Gathering, or 'gold' in Legend of the Five Rings) that you must provide to hire that crew and a measure of the card's overall power.
  - Faction: This symbol denoted the faction this crew belongs to. Crews without a symbol were unaligned.
  - Cannon: This statistic represented the crew's skill with a cannon. Its primary function was to perform cannon attacks upon other ships, simply by tacking a crew with more than 0 cannon ability.
  - Sailing: This statistic represented the crew's skill at sailing. A crew with sufficient sailing ability could tack to move the ship by one sea.
  - Adventuring: This statistic represented the crew's abilities in exploration and adventuring. This skill was mostly used to complete the requirements for Adventure cards, which would then bestow benefits upon that crewmember, the ship, or upon the player in other ways.
  - Influence: A measure of a crew's wealth, charisma, and diplomatic skills. Influence is required to hire more crew, and as a result, it is the most important ability in the first few turns of the game.
  - Swashbuckling: This measures the ability of the crew to repair the ship, in effect providing "damage soak" and how effective the crew is at Mêlée. This translates as damage (hits) inflicted from a successful boarding attack.

Crews also had various traits that allowed them to use certain cards. Some of the most common traits were:

  - Swordsman: The crew's skill in mêlée measured with a number (+1, +3 etc.). It translates as extra damage in boardings, and it allowed the crew to attach swordsman school attachment cards. All captains had some level of Swordsmanship.
  - Heroic/Villainous: These mutually exclusive traits revealed a crew's "way of life". There were various cards that were compatible with one of these two traits. For most of the history of the game, Villainous was considered a better trait to have on your Captain, since it gave access to easy card draw.
  - Sorcery: There were various types of sorcery in the world of Théah, and various crew could use them as attachments. However those attachments had a specific sorcery requirement of a certain level (0–2) that the crew had to have to attach them.

Each ship had a limited amount of space for crew and that meant that smaller ships usually had lower resource and offensive capabilities. Usually this was balanced out with different benefits, like stronger special abilities and lower sailing costs. Players usually chose crew for their deck depending on their style and their faction's strengths, usually focusing on one or two statistics and maybe a trait (like sorcery). Crew with sailing or swashbuckling were always useful due to their innate use on movement and damage soak, however players also focused on more than one or two of the other three skills, Cannon, Adventuring, and Influence so as to be able to use specific cards more easily. Decks which focused on many skills together were the most difficult to build, however a good player then had a much greater versatility.

Crew cards had a Punch as their boarding attack.

==== Actions ====
Action cards are the surprises you can spring on an unsuspecting opponent. They are one-use cards that have some immediate effect. In 7th Sea, action cards had two costs. One was for the player and the other for his target (the canceling cost) and it was in the form of Skill: number. Costs are paid by tacking one or more crew with the appropriate skill, until the number is fulfilled. The canceling cost was there for the target of the action, and it allowed him to cancel the action by paying it. Thus some pretty powerful cards could be balanced by having a lower canceling cost. Cost and cancel need not use the same skill.

Action cards came in two types, Acts and Reacts. Acts are cards a player used in his turn. They usually worked to provide some unexpected effect, such as a combined cannon attack or an unstoppable boarding. Reacts are the much more common form of action cards. They can only be played on specific triggers such as an augment to a cannon attack, or suffering hits instead of a boarding attack.

All decks employed action cards, and usually the more aggressive decks employed a greater number.

Action cards' boarding attack could either be a Dagger or a Slash.

==== Attachments ====
Attachment cards are default enhancing cards for your other cards (the other being adventures). After the player pays the cost, he chooses an appropriate card to attach it to. Usual targets for attachments were:

  - Crew: Attachments ranged from pistols and earrings, to parrots and spells.
  - Ship: Ship attachments usually modified the ship in some way, such as a treasure hold, better sails, figureheads (usually specific to factions) etc. Some ship attachments had the drawback that they took up crew space.
  - Sea: Sea attachments usually were ports, monsters, and allies you could employ. These often required a specific sea.

Usually attachments had some kind of trait that classified it, such as Item, Henchman, Pet, Swordsman School, etc. For example, a pistol would be an Item while Rum Runners would be an Ally. These traits were used to specify targets for other cards.

In later sets requirements for attachments became more frequent. Those requirements ranged from a skill level (Cannon 4), to the alliance to a faction (e.g. Crimson Rogers), to the existence of a trait (Villainous), or a trait at a specific level (e.g. Porte 2). Due to the speed of attachments, they usually had a much lower reward/cost ratio than adventures.

Attachment cards' boarding attack was a Club.

==== Adventures ====
This is the second type of card a crew could attach. Adventures are the usual stuff of Hollywood pirate or naval adventure films: ancient relics, captured damsels, sea monsters, etc. These cards were almost exclusively completed by the use of the adventuring skill and were defined by the following:

  - Seas away: Adventures did not automatically attach to a crew, but rather to a sea. When played, an adventure was placed a number of seas away from your ship (usually 1 to 3). To complete an adventure, your ship had to be on the same sea as the Adventure. This served as a balance factor for the more powerful or cheap adventures by forcing you to sail to the target sea to get it (something not always easy when opponents were waiting in the middle)
  - Native sea: Most adventures had one specific sea in which it was much easier to complete them. This could range from a single point of adventuring lower for low-end adventures, to several points lower for the more costly ones. Then other adventures were easier to attach to specific crew, such a Villainous, Skeletal or Rose and Cross crew member.
  - Reward: Adventure rewards usually increased a skill by a number of points with a high reward/cost ratio. However, in later expansions, Adventures started giving various effects, such as traits or special abilities.

Although Adventures were attached to a Sea, they were only available to the player that attached them (barring other card effects). This was a nice way to "archive" uncompleted adventures without cluttering your hand. However, some cards punished rampant adventure archiving.

Adventure Cards' boarding attack was a Thrust.

==== Chanteys ====
Chanteys were introduced later in the life of the game. They signified various global changes in the world of Théah in the form of popular songs used by the populace. Chanteys were similar to actions. However their effects, contrary to action cards, were permanent. They could either affect only the player or an opponent, or it could affect all players. Chanteys worked in a way similar to terrains in Legend of the Five Rings or Omens in Legend of the Burning Sands. That is, only one Chantey could be in effect at any one time. At any time that a Chantey came into play, the former Chantey was discarded. More powerful Chanteys had, instead of a cancel cost, a discard cost that any player could use to get rid of the Chantey.

==== Ships ====
These cards are special in that they are not in the deck but rather start in play, along with your captain. Most ships belonged to a specific faction and could only be used by matching captains. Each ship was defined by its faction, crew maximum, and sailing cost.

Crew maximum was used to determine the maximum number of crew you could have on your ship. Ships with a large crew maximum tended to be more powerful in the late game, but more vulnerable at the start.

Sailing cost shows how easy a ship is to maneuver. Some action cards did not use a fixed cost, but relied instead upon a ship's sailing cost (sometimes modified up or down). The advantage of a small ship was that it could fill fast and press the offensive quickly.

==== Seas ====
The five Seas were always the same. They came with each starter box and were placed in a specific order. Seas had no specific abilities other than forming a game space for ships to move and for being the target of cards. Each captain has a specific starting sea which was usually chosen as a result of the storylines. New players often wondered where the other two seas which are not represented with cards were. The answer lies in the setting of the world of Théah. The 6th sea is protected by a wall of flame and thus difficult to access, and the 7th sea is a mythical place and very hard to find. Neither of these two 'extra' seas played any major role in the card game.

=== Deck construction ===
Players make many choices when designing a deck. They must keep in mind both the captain's and ship's abilities, the faction's strengths and weaknesses, and the strategy they want to use. Even with the same Captain and Ship, it is possible to make completely different deck types.

- Restrictions
  - A player must first choose a captain. The captain determines the faction.
  - A player must choose a ship of the same faction as the captain, or an unaligned ship.
  - The deck may not be less than 60 cards including captain and ship.
  - A deck may not have more than 3 copies of a single card.

== Strategies ==
There are many different concepts for a deck and many different ways to achieve them, depending mainly on the faction and secondarily on the ship.

For example, the Castilians were mainly a boarding faction (which means they liked to attack in mêlée) but with the right construction it was possible to attack without boarding (by making ramming attacks and limited cannon). The original Castillian ship was a hulking galley but in later expansions they got a small fast ship that allowed them to perform a tactic which some called 'speed boarding'.

Some sample deck foci are:

- 'Atomic Cannon': These decks focused on sinking the opponent's ship with one big cannon attack. They usually had many adventures and actions to evade boardings.
- 'Plinging': These decks focused on producing many small attacks, slowly forcing the opponent to tack all their cards, rendering them unable to take action against you. This was mainly achieved with cannon, but there were variations with spells.
- Boarding: These decks focused on catching the opponent and entering boarding. They usually used big ships with lots of crew and had a nice spread of cards.
- 'Speed Boarding': These decks focused on catching the opponent in a boarding during the first or early second turn. If they couldn't, they usually lost. The ships these decks used were small and had small sailing requirements.
- 'Control': These rare decks tried to complete the secondary control victory condition. They were the harder decks to construct competitively.

Even within these broad categories, there were many ways to carry out any given strategy. For example, a boarding deck might use only the captain to deal damage while the rest of the crew absorbed hits, or it might use small attacks with pistols and weak characters or it could just have a nice spread. One could use boarding action cards to enhance the attacks or to just absorb damage. One could also use attachments to win the attacks more easily, or adventures to inflict more damage etc.

Combining various strategies was not uncommon, such as a boarding deck that used a big cannon attack before the boarding to soften the enemy.

== Game play ==
=== Start ===
At the start of each game, players used their captain's starting Wealth statistic to recruit their starting crew. Since the starting crew could be anyone from the deck, it was a nice tactic to have some backup crew in the deck for specific situations (much like a sideboard, only built-in). A captain's starting Wealth usually ranged from 7 to 10. Players typically chose a crew with high Influence statistics to start a game, although speed decks often preferred Sailing, Swashbuckling, and Cannon.

=== Phases ===
Each turn has 3 phases. The first phase is used to determine which player goes first; the second phase, the most important one, is where the game is actually played and the final phase is the end of turn were all resources are replenished (by untacking and drawing cards). Unlike in many games where a player performs as many actions as he wishes before passing to the next player, in 7th Sea each player performs only one action, and players pass to one another until none choose to take further actions.

In the main phase, starting with the first player, each player performs an action or passes and then play proceeded clockwise to the next player. Actions can be playing an Action card from one's hand, using a printed ability on a card in play, or performing an action innate to the game like hiring crew, or performing a cannon attack.

Once all players pass consecutively, the turn ends.

The innate actions all players can perform in 7th Sea are:

- Moving: By tacking Crew to produce Sailing points to equal or exceed the ship's sailing cost, a player can move his ship to an adjacent sea.
- Cannon Attack: By producing any number of cannon with a single Crew, a player can inflict that number of hits on a ship in the same sea.
- Hire Crew: If the ship has not reached its crew maximum, a player can reveal a crew from his hand and then produce equal or more influence than that crew's cost to recruit it.
- Begin a boarding: By producing sailing equal to the ship's sailing cost, a player can attempt to begin a boarding against a ship in the same sea.
- Complete an adventure: While in the same sea as one of his own adventures, a player can play all costs and attach the adventure to an appropriate target.

=== Boardings ===
Boarding is considered the most interesting phase of the game. Once begun, the involved ships lock together with their crews engaged in "cinematic mêlée battle". While a player can escape a ship's cannons by running away, the only ways to disengage from boarding are with both players' consent or with a card effect. Accordingly, boarding decks are rewarded for the difficulty of engagement.

Boarding occurs within the main phase of the game. During boarding, the rest of the game stops, so players can no longer play acts. Boarding consists of alternating boarding attacks between the two players involved. In turn, each boarding attack includes choosing a crew and sending it forward to attack (i.e. jumping to the other ship and causing some trouble). The defender can choose either to stand and take the hits (equal to the other crew's damage plus swordsman level) or to send someone forward to defend.

Each card in the deck has three boarding boxes. The large attack box is first, with two smaller defend boxes below it. Each boarding box has one of the following actions: [C] (Club), [P] (Punch), [D] (Dagger), [S] (Slash), or [T] (Thrust). The attacker starts by playing a card from his hand to initiate his attack. If possible, the defender resists by playing a matching defence card from his hand (i.e. the defender's card must have a defend box matching the attacker's attack box). The defender immediately counter-attacks with the action in the attack box of that defending card. The original attacker then defends himself against the counter-attack. In effect, the exchange is reminiscent of a continuous cinematic "Thrust-Slash-Parry-Riposte" mêlée. The mêlée ends when either player cannot defend against an attack (i.e. the player's hand is empty, he chose the order of his attacks wrongly, or he has a bad boarding hand). The last attacking player wins the boarding attack, and the loser suffers hits.

Boardings are interesting both because defenders can inflict hits and because the crews locked in mêlée suffer hits first. Such early hits risk loss of either crews' captain (and thus the game) while the crew may still be in otherwise prime condition. Because of this, a player may choose to avoid starting a boarding attack by passing or by playing a react (e.g. firing a musket or getting drunk). When both players perform a boarding attack, they draw 3 cards each and the attacks continue.

Since boarding boxes are spread in different card types, boarding decks usually have a wide variety of card types, unlike cannon and victory decks with few (two or three) card types. Thus, dedicated cannon decks can be caught helplessly in a boarding.

=== Death and destruction ===
Ships are fragile things. When a ship suffers hits, the crew is responsible for fixing it by tacking or sinking (getting killed). Hits cannot be ignored. When a captain sinks to absorb hits you lose the game. Players sometimes employed action cards to help them absorb hits.

=== Victory ===
In 7th Sea, there were two roads to victory. You could either sink all enemy ships, or perform a control victory (play several expensive cards, one in each sea).

== Storyline ==
The game was a heavily story influenced game. Its factions had ties to specific RPG elements and rivalries and alliances occurred between them as the story progressed. The first story arc saw many serious conflicts, not necessarily all tied together. Storyline deaths were not uncommon (they did not have some specific effect in the game), and the game even saw the death of an entire faction.

=== Factions ===
- Crimson Rogers: Bloodthirsty pirates led by the cruel and ruthless Captain Reis, the Crimson Rogers flew red sails and were feared more than any other faction, save perhaps the Black Freighter. Their motto was No Banter, No Barter, No Quarter. The Crimson Rogers have excellent cannon, adequate boarding and adventuring capabilities, but low influence. They are mostly Villainous.
- Sea Dogs: More privateers than pirates, the Sea Dogs were sponsored by Avalon (a nation inspired by mythic England). They angered the Crimson Rogers, leading to the destruction of their ship and the near-death of their first captain Berek, the luckiest man alive. Bloody Bonnie McGee took the helm and sacrificed her life for a chance to take down Reis. The Sea Dogs have high influence and jack of all trades crew, without any particular specialisation. They dabble in Glamour sorcery and are primarily Heroic, being the only faction in the game with no villainous crew.
- Castillians: Sailors from the nation of Castille (based on renaissance Spain), this faction was originally the enemy of the Montaigne, with whose nation they were at war. They later allied with the Montaigne faction to save their captain, Orduno. They were also allied with the Inquisition (the punitive, warlike arm of the church). Castillians are mainly a boarding faction with some cannon capabilities.
- Montaigne: Montaigne (based on renaissance France) is the wealthiest nation and as a result they excel at many things. They usually employ Musketeers for sword fights and their fighting style employs the most tricks. Their original captain, the General, was a mercenary soldier from Eisen who was promoted as a pirate hunter. Their secondary captain was mainly preoccupied with bringing Montaigne's rivals, the Castillians, back in line. Montaigne have many good swordsmen and fighting tricks while also being very fast on the offensive due to their high influence.
- The Brotherhood: The Brotherhood are escaped convicts from a Castillian prison who formed their own pirate nation. Their original captain, Allende, was recaptured, but later freed by Berek, who became the Brotherhood's new captain following his escape from Reis. The Brotherhood has high adventuring, giving them flexibility, but also making them weak to start, needing time to complete adventures. Later ships and captains with powerful abilities grant them greater playability.
- The Explorers: The explorers were neither pirates nor allied with any nation. Their captain, Guy McCormic was obsessed with finding ancient Syrneth artifacts (the remnants of a lost high-tech civilization). At some point, after he sacrificed a crewmember to his passion, the rest of the crew mutinied and overcame him. Explorers have very high adventuring and sailing and are very good at escaping trouble.
- The Corsairs: The only faction hailing from the Crescent Empire (inspired by the Ottoman Empire), the Corsairs are led by Kheired Din, a ruthless slavemaster who sacrificed his own crew to get results. The corsairs were hit hard story wise when their slaves rebelled and their leader, Espero, turned out to be a descendant of the lost Castillian royal bloodline. The second corsair ship was led by Ernesto Castillus (AKA Espero) whose actions were critical to the end of the storyline. Corsairs are very good at boarding, and have a very high damage absorption.
- The Gosse's Gentlemen: A former legend once again picks up the sword and sails the seven seas along with his band of heroic gentlemen-pirates. Gosse had sworn to bring down the Black Freighter captained by the man who killed his wife. He achieved this aim, with the help of Ernesto Castillus, the sacrifice of his ship, and his own life. The Gosse had very high swashbuckling, and as a result they were very good at boardings, and to some extent, damage absorption.
- The Vesten: The Vestenmannavnjar or Vesten (based on Vikings of the late Dark Ages) are raiders and warriors of an old tradition. Bitter over the betrayal by their greedy kinsmen, they hunt and loot any Vendel Trading ship they caught. Eventually betrayed from within, their captain Yngvild survived and hunted for revenge. The next captain was led by their betrayer and rival, Jorund. In keeping with their Viking inspiration, the Vesten specialise in boarding. Their cannon abilities are non-existent, but they make up for this with large amounts of damage-absorption.
- The Black Freighter: The undead of 7th Sea sail on a massive ghost ship, the Black Freighter that gives them their name. Their original Captain, Necros was brought back to avenge his death at the hands of Gosse. The original crew consisted of undead versions of normal crew (the faction can't recruit non Black Freighter crew) and resurrected crew from the other factions. The first story arc ended with the death of Necros and his ship. The Black Freighter was an interesting faction since it relied on skeletal crew and fear cards. They could go for either boarding or cannon and usually mixed both.

There were also a number of "unaligned" crew who belonged to no faction and so were usable by any Captain. Usually these were generic pirates, but some were given quite a bit of character and even included a handful of captains.

=== Story arc ===
The first story arc began with minor events and conflicts between the various factions and gradually progressed with events of greater importance which ended up changing the state of the world. Notable events include the rivalry between the Sea Dogs and the Crimson Rogers, which climaxed with the apparent death of Captain Reis at the hands of the Sea Dogs second captain; Bloody Bonnie McGee. There was also the appearance of the Black Freighter and its later defeat at the hands of Phillip Gosse by the sacrifice of his whole faction. And finally the Corsair's search for the final Syrneth switch which revealed the hidden island, Cabora, and their destiny.

The second story arc did not have enough time to be fully fleshed out but it started with the Montaigne Revolution and the capture of their former emperor.

=== Experience ===
As with most other AEG games, experience was a major factor in the game's progression. Experienced crew usually got stronger and costlier. Since 7th Sea had a lax uniqueness rule, usually experienced crew ended up becoming unique. Experienced crew sometimes ended up changing factions (Such as the experienced versions of killed crew becoming Black Freighter members) or gained some secret society allegiance.

- Experienced crew could simply be hired without requiring their original version to already be in play, unlike evolved Pokémon for example.

== History of 7th Sea ==
During the lifetime of 7th Sea, both the RPG and the CCG had a very loyal following. Players would often ask for a specific result in a storyline tournament while offering bounty to anyone who achieved it. The game may be cancelled, but a following of the game still exists with tournaments in major events and custom cards.

=== Expansions ===
The first base set of 7th Sea offered 6 factions for player to choose from, but later expansions revealed more factions. The game saw two more base sets and a final online-only set at its closing.

- No Quarter (Original base set, featuring factions: Crimson Rogers, Explorers, Sea Dogs, Brotherhood, Montaigne, Castillian. 1999, 323 cards. Set icon: white cannon in profile on a black background. Winner of the 1999 Origins Awards for Best Trading Card Game and Best Graphic Presentation of a Card Game or Supplement.)
- Strange Vistas (First expansion, featuring factions: the Corsairs, Gosse's Gentlemen. 1999, 161 cards. Set icon: white sail on a pale blue background. Winner of the 1999 Origins Award for Best Card Game Expansion or Supplement.)
- Broadsides (Identical reprint of No Quarter, except for six faction-specific cards. 1999, 323 cards. Set icon: white crossbones on green background.)
- Shifting Tides (Second expansion, featuring factions: Vesten, Montaigne. 1999, 161 cards. Set icon: white crown on pale red background.)
- Scarlet Seas (Third expansion, featuring factions: Crimson Rogers, Sea Dogs. 2000, 161 cards. Set icon: white crossed cutlasses on purple background.)
- Black Sails (Fourth expansion, featuring faction: Black Freighter. 2000, 54 cards. Set icon: black sail on white background. Instead of randomized boosters, this expansion was sold in 50-card fixed distribution boosters.)
- Fate's Debt (Fifth expansion, featuring factions: the Brotherhood, Corsairs. 2000, 161 cards. Set icon: white cannon in profile on a blue background.)
- Reaper's Fee (Sixth expansion, featuring factions: Castillians, Vesten. 2000, 161 cards. Set icon: white crossbones on black background. Probably the hardest set to currently locate.)
- Horizon's Edge (Seventh expansion, featuring factions: the Explorers, the Gosse's Gentlemen. 115 cards. Set icon: white crossed cutlasses on red background.)
- Iron Shadow (623 cards. The second revision of the base set was arguably the biggest release of the game since it contained all the ships and captains while also having new versions of older cards to make them more playable and a new card layout. From this set forward, the use of set icons was discontinued in favor of printing the set's name at the bottom edge of each of its cards.)
- Syrneth Secret (Eighth expansion, featuring factions: the Brotherhood, Montaigne. 2001, 169 cards.)
- Parting Shot (54 cards. The final set of 7th Sea was released only in an online form and mainly to close the storyline and balance the factions. A Final gift from AEG to its loyal customers.)

=== Ghost Ship: The Death of a Game ===
Although 7th Sea seemed to be going well sales-wise, there were some things that began to spell the end of the game. They were either easily avoidable or common blunders that have been known to end the life of many collectible card games.

- The third release of the base set saw the reprint of many older cards with new abilities to increase their playability. While many players saw this as a good move (because it effectively increased their card base), some had a hard time keeping track of the changes, while others did not want to waste money on new versions of cards they already owned.
- A series of storyline tournaments in which the players themselves would mark a faction for death, The Gosse Faction was selected. Many players incorrectly believed this meant that no more Gosse crew and Gosse-specific cards would appear in the game.
- Late in its lifespan, 7th Sea also opted for "facelift", meaning cards were reprinted, keeping 99% of the format, but with whole art design and background across. Conceptually this was a good move, but in practice it seemed to tire players to adjusting to the new art, getting new copies of older cards to match new cards, etc.
- A minor complaint arose in the last set being printed in the wrong size.
- 7th Sea's demise came with the success of AEG's new Warlord: Saga of the Storm CCG. AEG lacked the resources to support L5R, Warlord and 7th Sea, and as 7th Sea was the least successful of the three, it was retired to free up resources.

=== Present ===
The popularity of 7th Sea – like that of related games such as Doomtown or Rage – has waned. However, many players continue to play in tournaments and even design new cards and sets.

Because the RPG is maintained, there is still interest in the setting and a number of websites continue to support the CCG as well as the RPG.

The game has also been ported to OCTGN and Untap.in for online play.

In 2022, Pine Box Entertainment revived the game as an Expandable Card Game, in the same vein as games such as Doomtown CCG. 7th Sea: City of Five Sails, was successfully funded on Kickstarter in November, 2022. An inaugural tournament was held over two days at Gen Con in 2022 using pre-release starter decks. Sixty fine players attended the event and the finalists were Stephen Skilton and Hayes Hunter. A retro tournament was also held using the original edition of the game.

== Reviews ==
- Pyramid
- Inquest Gamer, February 2000
