= The Bloody Sands of Sicaris =

The Bloody Sands of Sicaris is a 2001 role-playing game adventure published by Paradigm Concepts.

== Plot summary ==
The Bloody Sands of Sicaris is an adventure in which a mid‑level adventure sends 4–6 player characters into a web of political intrigue, foreign conspiracies, and covert missions as they escort an Imperial legate to Sicaris to recover a missing noble and uncover the shadowy forces threatening to plunge the Imperium into war.

== Reviews ==
- Pyramid
- Backstab #33
- Gaming Frontiers (Volume 1 - 2002)
