= Freiburg (7th Sea) =

Freiburg is a 2000 role-playing game supplement published by Alderac Entertainment Group for 7th Sea.

== Contents ==
Freiburg is a supplement in which a boxed set presents Théah's most dangerous lawless city—founded by Eisenfürst Trägue atop a drachen graveyard—and supplies a full city guide, history, campaign, and map for adventures amid its corruption and opportunity.

== Reviews ==
- Backstab #26
- Realms of Fantasy
- RPG Review (Issue 26 & 27 - Dec/Mar 2014/2015)
