= Arcanis =

Tabletop role-playing game supplement

Arcanis was originally a campaign setting for the Dungeons & Dragons game, created by Henry Lopez and supported by Paradigm Concepts. It is also the name of the fictional world where the setting takes place. The setting was launched in 2001 and is known for its odd twists on the fantasy genre, as well as its wide member approval and community-based design and construction. Unlike many other fantasy roleplaying games, which focus primarily on tactical combat, the Arcanis campaigns focus on moral ambiguity and politics.

While originally launched as a d20srd title, Arcanis was relaunched in 2011 with a unique rules set as detailed in Paradigm Concepts. This system uses a similar initiative system to Feng Shui; a progressive clock system of initiative, with each action taking a specific number of 'ticks' of a clock rather than simply having everyone go in a predetermined order.

Arcanis is set on the continent of Onara, where a crumbling Coryani Empire (reminiscent of the Western Roman Empire) struggles with newly created nations such as Milandir (reminiscent of the Holy Roman Empire) or Canceri (reminiscent of Russia during the Middle Ages and the Balkans).

== Races ==
The playable character races in Arcanis differ from the traditional races in other Dungeons & Dragons campaign settings. There are seven primary races: Dark-kin (infernally tainted), Dwarves (cursed Giants), Elorii (Elves, but with some significant differences), Gnomes (offspring of a human and a dwarf), Humans (including the elementally attuned Kio and Undir), Ss'ressen (Lizard-folk), and Val (touched by the gods with different bloodlines depending on which God was their progenitor). While in the days of the d20srd rules other playable races were allowed—such as Half-Orcs—the most recent Arcanis RPG rules have streamlined the system somewhat to remove these Dungeons & Dragons holdovers.

=== Dark-Kin ===
Dark-kin are those born with demonic traits. They are usually born from human parents who carry recessive demonic traits. Because of their bloodlines, Dark-kin tend to be marginalized in society. Dark-kin are the results of a period of Onara's history called the Time of Terror, when Demons, Devils, and other Infernals were released from the Hells by the powerful magics of the Myrantian Empire.

=== Dwarves ===
Giants were assigned the task of protecting mankind. When they began to lord over man, the king of the gods, Illiir cursed the giants, diminishing them into dwarves. Later, Sarish, the grandson of Illiir and the god of Contracts came to the Dwarves and told them that should they craft the perfect item, their curse would be lifted.

The Dwarves are divided into different groups, called Enclaves. Unlike other humanoids on Onara, dwarves are barred from the afterlife due to their curse. To preserve their souls, each Dwarf carries with him a gem, known as Soul Stone to which their soul is trapped following their death, to be released when the Curse has been lifted.

=== Elorii ===
Elves in Arcanis are called Elorii. Made of the traditional Greek elements: Fire, Water, Air, and Earth, the Elorii are immortal. Elorii are divided into different sub-races based on their elemental ancestry, adding another subrace known as the Life Elorii, or Ardekenes.

The Elorii were created by four very powerful elementals in conjunction with a "life spirit" called Belisarda, who imbued elemental energies and life force into bioconstructed orc-like creature known as a Gar. Because of this, Elorii do not look like traditional Elves, having distinct fangs as well as other minor differences. These elemental spirits were worshipped by the Elorii as gods; they despise humanity because four of the human gods "absorbed" the four Elemental Lords, leaving only Belisarda. They eventually rebelled against their creators.

=== Gnomes ===
Gnomes in Arcanis are ugly, short half-breeds. These Gnomes are not an independent race, but are considered an 'aberration' race, resulting from the unholy breeding between Dwarves and Humans. Gnomes in Arcanis are disgustingly deformed, as the curse applied to dwarves applies equally to the stature of their offspring. However, unlike their Dwarven parents, Gnomes are not barred from the afterlife.

=== Humans ===
Humans mirror the traditional Dungeons & Dragons human. Most of humanity are latecomers to the continent of Onara (where most of the current story takes place), but at least one group, the Pengik, predate the Ss'regorean Empire, who have the oldest recorded history. Presently, there are two notable variations of Humanity: The Kio and the Undir. These subraces of Human have been attuned to the elements of air and water, respectively, and display several differences including longer life (Kio) and more elven traits (Undir).

=== Ss'ressen ===
Ss'ressen are lizard-men and a major component of the Ssethregoran Empire. This empire consists of many races, many of them serpentine such as Naga and Ssanu snake-men (who replaced the Yuan-ti after the latter were removed from the Open Gaming License content). The Ssethregorans are the oldest civilized group on the continent of Onara and at one point had conquered most of it. They are well known for their strange magics and were responsible for the creation of the Elorii. Originally, they worshiped the gods Kassegore and Yig, but with the rise of the Naga to a ruling position, they now worship vile gods known as the Varn. (Originally, they worshiped slaadi, but with the removal of these beings from the Open Gaming License content, Paradigm Concepts was forced to change this.)

The Black Talon ss'ressen rebelled against the Ssethregoran Empire and fled. They had come to worship a god known as The Fire Dragon. They live in a swampy area of the nation of Milandir. The Ghost Scale are descendants of a splinter group of Black Talons who came upon an artifact in the sewers of Grand Coryan that radiates a magical aura (which so happens to also radiate heat enough to support a ss'eressen clutch) and took to worshiping it as a god by the name of Herka. The Ashen Hide ss'ressen broke off from the Black Talons, deciding that the Fire Dragon was actually the human god of fire and war, Nier. The Ashen Hide Clutch now resides in the nation of Canceri.

=== Val ===
Val were created during the God War as the elite warriors of the Gods and thereafter, as the caretakers of Mankind. In their stead, every god sent his servants, the Valinor, to mingle with the populace, and create a semi-divine family capable of aiding mankind. Every Val has a bloodline, which is tied to a specific god; they have divine powers which they may improve; these are related to their bloodline. For example, val'Ossan are tied to Yarris, god of the sea, and can gain Bloodline Powers such as walking on water and controlling sea creatures.

Val are also the only psionic humans in Arcanis. Val always have steel grey eyes, unless they are psionically active; in psions, the iris turns clear, leaving the eye almost entirely white.

== Nations ==
The nations of Arcanis are mostly human affairs, all related to the First Imperium that fell thousands of years ago; most of these are ruled by the Val. The primary human lands are:

- The Republic of Altheria
- The Theocracy of Canceri
- The Coryani Empire
- The Hinterlands
- The Khitani Empire
- The League of Princes
- The Kingdom of Milandir
- Ymandragore

The three Elorii Nations are:

- Elonbé
- Entaris
- Malfea (a.k.a. Malfelen)

The major Dwarven Enclaves are:

- Solanos Mor
- Nol Dappa
- Tulipet
- Tir Betoq
- Encali

There are three major clutches of Ss'ressen (outside of the Ssethregoran Empire), the second two being offshoots of the first:

- Black Talons
- Ashen Hide
- Ghost Scale

The other races are mostly outcasts and wanderers, though occasionally small racial enclaves arise in larger cities, rather than maintaining organized civilizations.

== Religion ==
The Deities of Arcanis are sectioned off into different pantheons. The main pantheon is the Pantheon of Man, housing the human gods. Other pantheons such as the Pantheon of the Elves, are broken, or destroyed leaving only one or no gods behind.

In Arcanis, "true" gods are unconcerned with petty mortal morality, so have no alignment as gods in other settings do; only churches have alignment, depending on what aspects of a god they worship. The Pantheon of Man, for example, does not have alignment, but the Sethregoran Varn Gods do.

The foundation of the pantheon are three brother gods: Illiir, the Patron God of Emperors and Order, Sun God and Head of the Pantheon; Yarris, God of the Sea; and Neroth, God of Death. Further, three Goddesses are their sisters and in some cases consorts: Saluwé, Goddess of the Earth, consort of Illiir; Beltine, Goddess of the Soul, wife of Neroth; and Anshar, Goddess of Pain and Suffering. The children of Illiir and Saluwé are Hurrian, God of Storms and Honorable Combat, the Reluctant Warrior, Nier, God of Fire, War and Slaughter, and Larissa, Oracle of the Gods and (more recently) Goddess of Pleasure. The child of Neroth and Beltine is Cadic, the God of Shadows, Murder, and Music. Larissa and Cadic have a son named Sarish, God of Oaths and Binding of Demons. There is reference to Althares, God of Knowledge, Invention, and Artifice, as being the "Grand Uncle of Sarish," but exactly where he fits into the divine family tree is unclear.

=== Schisms ===
The Mother Church of the Pantheon of Man once held all the gods in equal worship, until a schism occurred which drove followers of Neroth, Sarish and Nier to form an independent church, the Dark Triumvirate in Canceri. The Mother Church and the Dark Triumvirate differ in several ways, primarily in that the Dark Triumvirate approves of activities the Mother Church fears: the creation of Undead and the summoning of demons and devils for the most part.

=== The Ss'ressen and Ssethregoran Gods ===
The Fire Dragon is the god worshiped by the Black Talon ss'ressen. The Ashen Hide split off from this group, believing that Fire Dragon was actually the human god, Nier.

The Ssethregoran Empire once worshiped the gods Kassegore and Yig. With the ascension of the Naga to a ruling position in the Empire, they have begun to worship a pantheon of beings from another plane known as the Varn.

=== The Elorii Pantheon ===
The Elorii follow the Elemental Lords that created them, despite the destruction of four of them. The remaining Elemental Lord, the life spirit Belisarda, was believed to have been destroyed by The Other (or Umor, as the Elorii knew him), until the arrival of a Prophet who claimed this was not true.

- Belisarda – Goddess of Life and Healing
- Keleos – God of Fire
- Mârok – God of Earth
- Osalían – God of Air
- Beröe – Goddess of Water

=== Elorii heresy ===
A somewhat common movement among Elorii has been the practice of identifying elemental lords with one of the human gods that supposedly absorbed those elemental lords' powers. For instance, some Elorii followers of the Lord of Air consider Hurrian, the Storm Lord in the Pantheon of Man, to be their God. To other Elorii this seems to be heresy and is considered to be so, although the Mother Church (and the Dark Triumvirate in the case of Nier) has little or no issues for Elorii who choose this path.

=== Myrantian gods ===
The ancient Myrantian Hegemony had its own pantheon of gods, although much information about them has been lost to the ages. The Mother Church of Coryan considers worship of the Myrantian deities heresy, but allows the worship of traditional Pantheon of Man deities under the names of Myrantian gods. The Myrantian Pantheon seems primarily based on the Ancient Egyptian pantheon, though not entirely. Tzizhet is considered a combination of Sarish and Neroth. Shu is a god of storms, sky, and magic, considered an amalgam of Hurrian and Sarish.

== Factions and secret societies ==
The setting also has secret societies, which are factions who have beliefs and goals that occasionally aid or impede the mission of players. Each faction varies in its goals as well as how secret each faction is. Many secret societies exist in the world, though a good number of them are restricted to non-player characters in the living campaigns. The following secret societies have been open to player characters in the living campaigns:

- The Orthodoxy seeks to maintain orthodox human religion and eradicate heretical worship of the Pantheon of Man.
- The Hawk and Shield seek to eradicate the minions of the Sorcerer King or protect those with arcane gifts from his depredations, respectively.
- The Emerald Society are archaeologists who seek to discover anything and everything about the history of Onara, especially from the First Imperium of Man.
- The Followers of the Azure Way wish to restore mankind to new glory by establishing a united Second Imperium of Man.
- The Mourners in Silence believe that the gods of Arcanis have died or never existed.
- The Swords of Nier are Nierites who follow Leonydas val'Virdan, Sword of the Heavens.
- The Order of the Twilight Bough are Elorii.
- The Laerestri are Elorii from Elonbé in the Vastwood. Though their existence is not secret, they sometimes receive secret orders from Elonbé.

In addition, sometimes secret orders are issued to specific nationalities, sides in war, or other subgroups.

== Living Arcanis ==
Living Arcanis was the name of the first Living Campaign set in the Arcanis setting. It was run by Paradigm Concepts who hosts major events at large gaming conventions, such as Gen Con and Origins Game Fair. Also, Living Arcanis was played at smaller regional conventions throughout the world, many of which host special events, as well as by players at home.

The core plot of the campaign was closely controlled by Henry Lopez. There are also several groups of quasi-independent writers whose adventures are sub-plots to the main story and are centered around a specific city, region, or secret society. These domains are known as Invisible Kingdoms, and their stewards are known as Invisible Kings and Queens.

The first Living Arcanis campaign ended in 2009 with a climactic battle that ended the Coryani Civil War. A second interactive, "living" campaign, started a year later with Paradigm's new Arcanis game rules. This new campaign, originally called the Chronicles of the Shattered Empires and renamed Legends of Arcanis, is set about 50 years after the first one.

== Awards ==
- 2008 Origins Award, "Codex Arcanis" Best Roleplaying Supplement
- 2012 Origins Award, "Arcanis: The World of Shattered Empires" Best RPG of 2011
