= 7th Sea Game Master's Guide =

Role-playing game supplement

7th Sea Game Master's Guide is a 1999 role-playing game supplement published by Alderac Entertainment Group for 7th Sea.

== Contents ==
7th Sea Game Master's Guide is a role-playing game supplement for the nations of Théah.

== Reviews ==
- Pyramid
- SF Site
- RPG Review (Issue 26 & 27 - Dec/Mar 2014/2015)
- Magus (Issue 41 - Sep 1999)
- The Guild Companion (Dec 1999)
- Warpstone (Issue 14 - Summer 2000)
- Dragon (German Issue 10 - Sep/Oct 2000)
