= The Spear of the Lohgin =

The Spear of the Lohgin is a 2001 role-playing game adventure published by Paradigm Concepts.

== Plot summary ==
The Spear of the Lohgin is an adventure in which level 4–6 player characters investigate a plague in Ashvan and uncover a dark conspiracy involving a stolen divine relic that threatens to plunge Milandir—and the world—into eternal darkness.

== Reviews ==
- Pyramid
- Polyhedron #146
- Asgard (Issue 1 - Jul 2001)
