= Scarred Lands Gazetteer: Ghelspad =

- Publisher: Sword & Sorcery Studios
- Publication date: 2001

Scarred Lands Gazetteer: Ghelspad is a 2001 role-playing game supplement published by Sword and Sorcery Studios for d20 System.

== Contents ==
Scarred Lands Gazetteer: Ghelspad is a supplement in which the continent of Ghelspad is detailed.

== Publication history ==
Shannon Appelcline noted that as the "Scarred Land" setting was being previewed in other releases, "Gazetteer: Ghelspad (2001) and Gazetteer: Termana (2002) kicked things off by describing the world's two main continents and they would be supported by both adventures and more localised setting books."

== Reviews ==
- Backstab #31
- Backstab #34 (as "L'Atlas de Ghelspad")
- Black Gate
- Pyramid
- Realms of Fantasy
