= 7th Sea Players' Guide =

Role-playing game supplement

- Publisher: Alderac Entertainment Group
- Publication date: 2000
- ISBN: 978-1887953030

7th Sea Players' Guide is a 2000 role-playing game supplement published by Alderac Entertainment Group for 7th Sea.

== Contents ==
7th Sea Players' Guide is a supplement in which the basic game rules including character creation are presented, along with an overview of the setting.

== Publication history ==
Shannon Appelcline noted that as Rob Donoghue was developing Fate, he "had liked the fact that AEG's 7th Sea Player's Guide (1999) required you to pay for 'backgrounds' - which were what most games would call 'flaws' or 'disabilities'. Donoghue this considered negative aspects like 'drunk' to be possibilities in the Fate system from the start."

== Reviews ==
- Pyramid
- SF Site
- Backstab (as "Secrets de la 7eme Mer: Guide du Joueur, edition reivsee")
- Knights of the Dinner Table Magazine (Issue 164 - Jun 2010)
- Magus (Issue 41 - Sep 1999)
- The Guild Companion (Nov 1999)
- Warpstone (Issue 14 - Summer 2000)
- Dragon (German Issue 10 - Sep/Oct 2000)
