= Tales from the Loop (role-playing game) =

2017 role-playing game

- Cover art by Simon Stålenhag
- Designers: Nils Hintze; Simon Stålenhag
- Illustrators: Simon Stålenhag
- Publishers: Free League Publishing; Modiphius Entertainment
- Publication: March 10, 2017; 9 years ago
- Years active: 2017–present
- Genres: Science fiction Alternative history
- Languages: English, Swedish
- Systems: Year Zero Engine
- Playing time: Varies
- Chance: Dice rolling
- Skills: Role-playing, improvisation, arithmetic
- Website: https://freeleaguepublishing.com/games/tales-from-the-loop-rpg/

Tales from the Loop (Swedish: Ur Varselklotet), subtitled "Roleplaying in the '80s That Never Was", is an alternative history science fiction tabletop role-playing game published in 2017 by Free League Publishing, the international arm of Swedish game and book publisher Fria Ligan AB, and Modiphius Entertainment. The game, based on the art of Simon Stålenhag, envisions an alternative world where a group of bored and ignored preteens and teens solve mysteries caused by new technology near their hometown.

== Description ==
=== Setting ===
Tales from the Loop is set in an alternative history world taken from the artwork of Simon Stålenhag. According to this alternative timeline, back in the 1940s, research began on particle accelerators. In the 1960s, two massive underground particle accelerators were built in Sweden and Colorado with the promise of a harvest of technological marvels that would change everyone's lives. Tales from the Loop is set twenty years later, in the late 1980s, and the better life has not materialized. Although the particle accelerators have created robots and large skyships, the detritus of failed experiments and the ruins of abandoned high tech company buildings litter the landscape. Generally the life of the average family has not changed for the better. A campaign can either be set in the Mälaren Islands, west of the Swedish capital of Stockholm, or in a city in the Southwest United States that resembles Boulder City, Nevada. There is also a step-by-step guide for the gamemaster to use their own hometown.

=== Character generation ===
Player characters are preteens and young teenagers age 10–15 who live in a society where they are bored and largely left to themselves. Players can choose archetypes for their characters including Bookworm, Jock, Troublemaker, Popular Kid and Weirdo. Unlike most role-playing games, characters in Tales from the Loop cannot be killed, although in an ongoing campaign or due to an in-game effect, they are removed from the game if they reach the age of sixteen.

=== Game system ===
The game uses the Year Zero Engine first developed by Tomas Härenstam for the post-apocalyptic role-playing game Mutant: Year Zero. (Härenstam served as the editor and project manager for Tales from the Loop.) Problems are resolved by rolling a pool of six-sided dice, with any 6 rolled marking success. Attributes and skills (Sneak, Force, Move, Build, Tinker, Calculate, Contact, Charm, Lead, Investigate, Comprehend, and Empathize) may allow the player to add more dice to the dice pool, increasing the chances of success. However, if a character has earned a condition such as Scared or Injured, dice are removed from the dice pool.

=== Gameplay ===
The game principles are that life for the characters is dull and boring, but the area around the town is full of wonderful, mysterious things. An adventure is set up as a Mystery, and in order to successfully resolve the Mystery, characters must overcome a series of Troubles, which can range from having to be home by a certain time to dealing with a bully to disarming or otherwise overcoming a booby-trap on a door that must be opened. Each Mystery is played as a series of scenes, much like a TV drama. Although the gamemaster leads the players into the Mystery, each scene is set collaboratively with the players before action continues. As critic Jukka Kauppinen noted, "The players and the gamemaster take turns verbally staging a new scene — where we are, what it's like there — and only then what we do."

=== Campaign ===
The book presents a chronologically-linked set of four Mysteries called "The Four Seasons of Mad Science" that take place over a calendar year:

- "Summer Break and Killer Birds": The Kids hears pigeons having a conversation and investigate
- "Grown-Up Attraction": Adults start disappearing without any sign of struggle.
- "Creatures from the Cretaceous": The search for a missing dog leads to the discovery of creatures that don't belong in our time
- "I, Wagner": The Kids discover a body in a stream, and are drawn into a Mystery with robots and humans that may affect them closely.

== Publication history ==
In 2017, Swedish artist Simon Stålenhag was raising money on Kickstarter to publish a book of his art titled Tales from the Loop. One of the stretch goals offered was the creation of a role-playing game. A second Kickstarter campaign to publish the role-playing game was initiated by Fria Ligan AB, who surpassed their crowdfunding goal and raised a total of 3,745,896 kr from 5,600 backers. The role-playing game Tales from the Loop was subsequently published as a 184-page hardcover book in 2017 by Free League Publishing, the international arm of Swedish game and book publisher Fria Ligan AB, and Modiphius Entertainment. Cover art and interior art were by Stålenhag, and cartography was by Christian Granath.

A stand-alone expansion, Things from the Flood (Swedish: Flodskörden), based on Stålenhag's art book of the same name, was created by Nils Hintze, Rickard Antroia, and Tomas Härenstam. The 216-page hardcover book was published in 2019 with cover art by Stålenhag, interior art by Stålenhag and Reine Rosenberg, and cartography by Christian Granath.

In 2020, the setting of the role-playing game was transferred to the TV series Tales from the Loop developed by Nathanial Halpern and Simon Stålenhag. The series tells eight stories of children's encounters with strange technology.

== Reception ==
Shut Up & Sit Down praised Tales from the Loop for its comfortable, contemporary setting, simple rules that make the game easy to run, and the alternation between sci-fi and the kids' lives, but criticized the Type system for characters, noting "a suggested 'Pride' for the Weirdo involved being homosexual –– the only mention of queerness in the entire game. Those of us who identify as GLBTQ bristled at that: why was only the Weirdo queer, with queerness as a (possibly secret) Pride? Why not more fully address being a GLBTQ kid in the 1980s?" The review concluded, "For new RPG players, Tales is a decent game that you'll enjoy and that will make your heart burst. But you need an experienced GM who’s able to either alter the book’s mysteries or create their own, and who can put in work when poor dice rolls hold the players back."

Rob Weiland of Geek & Sundry named Tales from the Loop 2017's best RPG release and praised Stålenhag's art, the collaborative nature between the GM and players, and the simplicity of running the game. Weiland concluded, "It has a simple system that is easy to explain but holds up under several plays. It has a setting that’s immediately evocative but also leaves plenty of room for GMs to build out their own world. It offers players a chance to experience the rush of memory, the pain of childhood and the wonder of movies."

In a review of Tales from the Loop in Black Gate, Andrew Zimmerman Jones said, "Though not based directly on an established franchise, it draws richly from elements of popular culture that will make it resonate with many players. The focus on narrative play also means it’s a good game for people who aren’t necessarily big into learning a ton of new rules."

Jukka Kauppinen, writing for the Finnish games magazine Skrolli, called the game, "downright delicious in its diversity. The science fiction world created by the Swedish artist Simon Stälenhag is, after all, both delightful vintage and tickling novelty." Kauppinen concluded, "This mutual storytelling and interaction makes this game more of a campfire circle than a traditional role-playing game. At the same time, its setting in the real world, tinged with science fiction and even horror, creates a delicious and unique adventure environment."

In his 2023 book Monsters, Aliens, and Holes in the Ground, RPG historian Stu Horvath noted that the game system "pushes the players to constantly reevaluate their characters' relationships with the everyday world, for better or worse. It won't be long before navigating entanglements with parents, teachers, siblings and bullies proves just as risky to the characters, and central to the players' experience, as trying to find out what happened with the time portal or dealing with a rampaging robot." Horvath concluded, "The appeal of Tales from the Loop is Stålenhag's deep shadows and purple dusks. They hide the dangers and mysteries that often act [as] an escape hatch, a way to avoid prosaic problems."

== Awards ==
- At the 2017 Golden Geek Awards, Tales of the Loop won "RPG of the Year", and was a finalist for " Best RPG Artwork/Presentation"
- At the 2017 ENnie Awards, Tales from the Loops won five Gold Medals:
  - Product of the Year
  - Best Writing
  - Best Setting
  - Best Game
  - Best Art, Interior

== See also ==
- Particle accelerators in popular culture
- Neo-futurism
- Cyberpunk derivatives
