= Agone =

Agone is an epic fantasy roleplaying game based on novels by award-winning fantasy writer Mathieu Gaborit. Agone is set in the land of Harmundia – also known as the Twilight Realms. The game was published in French starting in 1999 by the now-defunct company Multisim, which also translated five books into English starting in 2001. There are over 30 books and supplements for the game published in French.

== Materials published in English ==
Multisim published five products for the game in English. Agone: an Epic Roleplaying Game in the Twilight Realms comprises the rules of the game plus one 'drama' or adventure. The Grey Papers details several 'domains' or liege-lands, and includes one drama. The King of Spring includes rules for playing in a domain, and one drama in three parts. The Grimoire Volume One is a compendium of magic and also includes a drama. Gamemasters Pack includes a gamemaster's screen and a map of Harmundia.

== Setting information ==
In the beginning there were Four Muses – eternal beings that had the ability to create substance from nothing. Working together the Muses created the universe and – primarily – Harmundia. Seeking perfection they created many life-forms until they finally create a new Eternal - the Masque. -Agone Core Rulebook

The setting and theme for the game and its world is very Shakespearean in tone. The world and all of its creatures were created by the four Muses. The Masque, the fifth Muse created by the first four, now tries to gain control of the world and everyone in it. Agone is set several millennia after the Masque was created, the Muses little more than a vague memory to most, and Harmundia is split into several kingdoms. The Muses have long ago split into various kinds of phenomena in order to hide from the Masque. All manner of humans and non-humans walk the streets.

== Rules ==
Unlike roleplaying games like Dungeons & Dragons 3rd Edition, where characters begin with little or no experience and gain it throughout the game, characters in Agone are meant to be of middle age and high rank. Most will hold offices of nobility or military status. Referred to as "The Inspired", they will have high scores and be fairly accomplished in their fields of expertise. Agone is more about intrigue than mere combat, and this is made clear from the very beginning, with the game focusing very much on a noire style of gameplay. This also means that PCs have a higher chance of succeeding at a task than is usual for a game, providing a very different style of gaming from Dungeons & Dragons 3rd Edition, for example. Inspired are very similar to White Wolf’s Exalted in this respect.

All skills and checks are based on a d10 system of Attribute Skill Variable Modifier vs. Difficulty or an opposing roll. This convention applies to all rolls in the system.

== Magic ==
There are three main types of magic in Agone - Ascendancy, The Magical Arts and Invoking.

=== Ascendancy ===
Ascendancy refers to the Dancers, a phenomenon brought about by the war between the Masque and the Muses. Dancers are small three-inch tall humanoids that are essentially the living manifestation of magic. Capable of altering the universe with their eternal dancing, these little creatures are sought after by many mages across the length and breadth of Harmundia. Players can choose from three schools of magic if they desire to use Ascendancy: Jornist, Eclipsist and Obscurantist. Each school relates to how a mage uses Dancers and in turn defines what “spells” are available. Jornists love and care for their Dancers, and as such can cast healing and supportive spells. Eclipsists are opportunists, who trade and negotiate with their Dancers, getting sneakier, subtler spells. Obscurantists torture and torment their Dancers, and so have access to the most aggressive magics.

=== The Magical Arts ===
The Magical Arts are only available to Inspired characters. This is magic via the use of the various arts of the Muses. Painting, Sculpture, Music and Poetry can be used to perform a series of magical effects – again taken from a spell list. The system provides rules for improvised magic, allowing a broader range of effects than initially listed. Furthermore, Concordists – those who use the Magical Arts – can take a higher difficulty to boost their spells to higher levels of effect.

=== Invoking ===
Invoking is the magic of using the Darkness to bring demons out of the Abyss in order to exchange services. Deals are put into writing on magical contracts called Connivances. Invokers can then bring the demons out of the Abyss by tracing, with magical inks, the shadows cast by the sun on the landscape.

== Reviews ==
- Backstab #19
