= Warcraft: The Roleplaying Game =

Tabletop role-playing game

- Various book covers, all from the first edition.
- Designers: Deirdre Brooks with Andrew Bates and Mur Lafferty (1st edition); Mike Johnstone with Andrew Bates and Luke Johnson (2nd edition)
- Publishers: Sword & Sorcery Studios
- Publication: 2003 (1st edition: Warcraft RPG); 2005 (2nd edition: World of Warcraft RPG)
- Genres: Fantasy
- Systems: d20 System, OGL

Warcraft: The Roleplaying Game was a licensed tabletop role-playing game line published by Sword & Sorcery Studios from 2003 to 2008. It is set in the fictional world of Azeroth from the Warcraft computer games by Blizzard Entertainment. The Warcraft RPG was "100% compatible" with the Dungeons & Dragons revised third edition rules and it was released under the Open Game License.

In 2026, Wizards of the Coast and Blizzard released the Dungeons & Dragons: World of Warcraft sourcebook for 5.5 Edition.

== Publication history ==
=== Sword & Sorcery Studios (2003–2008) ===
In 2003, Sword & Sorcery Studios, an imprint of White Wolf Publishing, began publishing a licensed tabletop role-playing game line for Dungeons & Dragons set in the fictional world of Azeroth from the Warcraft computer games by Blizzard Entertainment. Shannon Appelcline commented that "Warcraft: The Roleplaying Game (2003) was a rare product that actually carried Wizards of the Coast's 'Dungeons & Dragons' logo and as a result was a sourcebook, not a full game".

In 2005, a second edition of the game rules called World of Warcraft: The Roleplaying Game was released, renamed to tie in with the success of World of Warcraft. In "translating" WoW into a tabletop experience, this project sought to break the limitations of the computer-programmed Azeroth in ways such as giving players the ability to complete quests with their own imagined methods and to change the inherent setting of the game with their own ideas. Appelcline noted that this edition became Open Game License-based. Sword & Sorcery released their last book for setting in 2008.

As of 2010, Blizzard listed nine books as part of the Warcraft, later World of Warcraft, tabletop role-playing games. While they have been recommended on the WoW website as providing "a wealth of information about Warcraft lore", in 2011, Community Manager "Bashiok" stated that these books sometimes diverge from the established canon of lore in the Warcraft video games, though some ideas originating in the RPG books have made their way into the official Warcraft canon.

=== Wizards of the Coast (2026) ===
Dungeons & Dragons: World of Warcraft
- Rules required: 5.5 Edition
- Campaign setting: Azeroth (from World of Warcraft)
- Lead designers: James Wyatt
- Authors: Joey Haeck, Ari Marmell, Ben Petrisor, Erin Roberts, Carl Sibley, Jason Tondro
- First published: November 17, 2026
- ISBN: 978 0 7869 7010 0

At Gen Con 2026, Wizards of the Coast announced a new Universes Beyond program for licensed Dungeons & Dragons partnerships; releases are part of the seasonal structure for 5.5 Edition. This program is similar to Wizards of the Coast's Universes Beyond program for Magic: The Gathering.

In November 2026, the Dungeons & Dragons: World of Warcraft sourcebook was published by Wizards of the Coast in collaboration with Blizzard. It headlines the Season of Champions. The sourcebook features various factions, monsters, and locations from the Azeroth setting as well as player options for games in this setting. Two exclusive editions were released to select game shops – an alternate cover edition, with art by Forrest Imel, and a collector's edition. A North American shipping delay impacted the Early Access physical product release in early November; wide release is scheduled for November 17, 2026.
