= EverQuest Role-Playing Game =

Tabletop role-playing game

- Cover of EverQuest Role-Playing Game Player's Handbook
- Designers: Owen K.C. Stephens and others
- Publishers: Sword and Sorcery Studios
- Publication: August 19, 2002 (1st edition)
- Genres: Fantasy
- Systems: d20 System variant

EverQuest Role-Playing Game is a role-playing game based on the EverQuest fantasy massively multiplayer online role-playing game (MMORPG). The game was published by White Wolf under its Sword and Sorcery Studios imprint. EverQuest Role-Playing Game shares many things with the MMORPG, such as setting, available races and classes, monsters, spells, and items.

== History ==
EverQuest Role-Playing Game was first published in summer 2002 under Wizards of the Coast's Open Gaming License using a system nearly identical to the d20 System, but was not d20 System branded because it included self-contained rules for character creation and advancement.

In early 2005, a major revision in the form of the EverQuest II Player's Guide was released, which deviated even further from the d20 System. A notable example is its approach to classes. There are only four character classes, called "Archetypes", available to starting characters. Each archetype has several more advanced classes, called "Classes" and "Subclasses", associated with it; these work much like prestige classes in standard d20 System games. Characters can freely mix the four basic archetypes, but may only take the more advanced classes associated with one of the archetypes.

The EverQuest II Player's Guide did not contain rules for magic, though a free download at Sword and Sorcery Studio's website did give basic spells for low-level characters. Almost a year later, on March 1, 2006, the EverQuest II Spell Guide, which included the core rules for magic and a full spell list, was published in PDF form only.

Freelancers and customer service representatives have stated that future EverQuest RPG releases, if any, will have statistics for both the EverQuest and EverQuest II games, rather than being exclusively for one or the other. As of 2011 no further products in either line have been released, and all mention of the EverQuest property have been removed from the White Wolf website.

== Volumes ==
| Title | Release date | Game |
|---|---|---|
| EverQuest Role-Playing Game Player's Handbook | August 19, 2002 | EverQuest |
| Monsters of Norrath | November 5, 2002 | EverQuest |
| EverQuest Game Master's Guide | February 17, 2003 | EverQuest |
| Realms of Norrath: Freeport | April 14, 2003 | EverQuest |
| Befallen | April 28, 2003 | EverQuest |
| Realms of Norrath: Everfrost Peaks | June 2003 | EverQuest |
| Al'Kabor's Arcana | September 1, 2003 | EverQuest |
| Temple of Solusek Ro | September 22, 2003 | EverQuest |
| Luclin | December 1, 2002 | EverQuest |
| Monsters of Luclin | January 19, 2004 | EverQuest |
| Solusek's Eye | February 2004 | EverQuest |
| Realms of Norrath: Forests of Faydark | February 2, 2004 | EverQuest |
| Realms of Norrath: Dagnor's Cauldron | May 24, 2004 | EverQuest |
| Plane of Hate | August 2004 | EverQuest |
| Heroes of Norrath | November 1, 2004 | EverQuest |
| EverQuest II Player's Guide | February 28, 2005 | EverQuest II |
| EverQuest II Spell Guide | March 1, 2006 | EverQuest II |
