= Paradigm Concepts =

Game publishing company

Paradigm Concepts, Inc.
- Type: Role-playing game publisher
- Industry: Role-playing games
- Website: http://www.paradigmconcepts.com/

Paradigm Concepts, Inc. is a small-press game publishing company located in Fort Lauderdale, Florida. The company was founded by Henry Lopez, Nelson Rodriguez, Pedro "Stat Monkey" Barrenechea, and Eric Wiener in 2000,

They published the award-winning Arcanis campaign setting and managed the Living Arcanis campaign independent of the RPGA.

Previously Arcanis operated as a d20 system campaign setting using the rules of Dungeons & Dragons.

The Arcanis Roleplaying Game was released in the summer of 2011 with the Legends of Arcanis campaign - inheritor of the Living Arcanis history.

Then later, Arcanis was released as the Arcanis5e line, using the 5th edition ruleset of the Dungeons & Dragons game.

They previously published the self-developed Witch Hunter: The Invisible World game line, which was later sold to Alligator Ally

Paradigm Concepts Inc. also produced Spycraft, d20 System, Legend of the Five Rings and True 20 books under license.

In 2013, Paradigm Concepts published Rotted Capes, written by Henry Lopez and Pedro "Stat Monkey" Barrenechea, and launched it in 2025 on BackerKit as Rotted Capes: Second Bite, a 2nd edition featuring the new Uncanny system.

== Awards ==
The company won the 2005 ENnie award for Fans' Choice Best Publisher. The company also won the Roleplaying Game of the Year at the 2011 Origins Awards for the Arcanis Role Playing Game.

Paradigm Concepts is known for their Origins Game Fair performance and manages the Gathering, the primary Origins Game Fair organized role playing game event.

== RPG game settings ==
- Arcanis RPG
- Arcanis5e
- Rotted Capes
- Witch Hunter: The Invisible World

== Products ==
- Races of Legend
- SpellDecks
- Spycraft
- Legend of the Five Rings RPG
- True 20
- Arcanis: the World of Shattered Empires
- Arcanis: the Roleplaying Game (Arcanis)
- Arcanis 5e Campaign Setting
- Arcanis 'Cert Shirts'
- Witch Hunter: the Invisible World
- Witch Hunter: the Invisible World, Second Edition
- Rotted Capes

== Reception ==
Paradigm Concepts won the 2005 Gold Ennie Award for "Fan's Choice for Best Publisher".

Paradigm Concepts won Roleplaying Game of the Year for the "Arcanis Roleplaying Game"

== See also ==
- The Spear of the Lohgin
- The Bloody Sands of Sicaris
