= Witch Hunter: The Invisible World =

Witch Hunter
The Invisible World
- Designers: Scott Charlton, Rucht Lilavivat, Henry Lopez, M. Sean Molley, Brian Schoner, Robert J. Schwalb, Robert Vaughn
- Publishers: Alligator Alley Entertainment
- Publication: 2007
- Genres: Swashbuckling, Colonial, Horror
- Systems: Custom

Witch Hunter: The Invisible World is an American ENnies-nominated swashbuckling, colonial, horror role-playing game. It was first published by Paradigm Concepts in 2007 and premiered at the Origins Game Fair. The players play witch hunters, otherwise-normal men and women who have left their past behind in order to seek and destroy supernatural evil. Major contributors to Witch Hunter are: Scott Charlton, Pat Laboyko, Rucht Lilavivat, Henry Lopez, M. Sean Molley, Brian Schoner, Robert J. Schwalb, Robert Vaughn, and Eric Wiener.

A second edition of the game was released in 2014 with Eric Wiener as the lead designer. In 2016, the Witch Hunter game line was acquired by Alligator Alley Entertainment, who now holds the rights for game and associated media.

== Setting ==
The game is set in an alternate version of 1689. The presence of magic has allowed the Aztec Empire to survive Spanish invasion and the Netherlands is still in firm control of New Amsterdam. The Black Plague was far more devastating to the male population of Europe, so women have assumed roles and professions that were previously denied to them. The heroes are pitted against the Devil himself, usually referred to as "The Adversary". The campaign background describes how King Solomon (with the aid of six wise magi) created a Great Seal to bar the minions of the Adversary from this world. Unfortunately, the process was corrupted, such that the Seal would eventually fade. As a result of this corruption, demons and other supernatural threats have slowly been passing from "The Invisible World" to ours.

== Characters ==
Creation of a Witch Hunter is done through a choice based system. Players choose a background that provides base skills and a unique ability. Players also generate stats by purchasing them with a points pool. Players also choose an order of Witch Hunters which they are a member of. Each order grants a unique ability and philosophy.

== System ==
Witch Hunter uses a d10 dice-pool based skill-set of rules. For any given task that the character wishes to attempt, the player rolls a number of ten-sided dice. This number equals the relevant ability plus the number of skill levels plus any relevant modifiers. For every die roll that equals 7 or more, the character has achieved one "success". If the player rolls a "10", it is counted as a success and the die is re-rolled. Re-rolled 10's are also re-rolled, which means that even a neophyte has a small chance of performing remarkable acts. If there are no successes and at least one "1", this is considered a "botch". If the character achieves sufficient successes, then he accomplishes the task. For some tasks, successes beyond the minimum cause additional degrees of success, such as a more potent attack.

== Awards ==
- Witch Hunter was a 2008 semi-finalist for the 34th Annual Origins Awards for the best role playing game category.
- Witch Hunter was nominated for three 2008 GenCon ENWorld RPG Awards (the ENnies) for Best Product, Best Game, and Best Rules.

== Reviews ==
- Pyramid
