= Transhumanism in fiction =

Many of the tropes of science fiction can be viewed as similar to the goals of transhumanism. Science fiction literature contains many positive depictions of technologically enhanced human life, occasionally set in utopian (especially techno-utopian) societies. However, science fiction's depictions of technologically enhanced humans or other posthuman beings frequently come with a cautionary twist. The more pessimistic scenarios include many dystopian tales of human bioengineering gone wrong.

Examples of "transhumanist fiction" include novels by Linda Nagata, Greg Egan, and Hannu Rajaniemi. Transhuman novels are often philosophical in nature, exploring the impact such technologies might have on human life. Nagata's novels, for example, explore the relationship between the natural and artificial, and suggest that while transhuman modifications of nature may be beneficial, they may also be hazardous, so should not be lightly undertaken. Egan's Diaspora explores the nature of ideas such as reproduction and questions if they make sense in a post-human context. Rajaniemi's novel, while more action oriented, still explores themes such as death and finitude in post-human life.

Fictional depictions of transhumanist scenarios are also seen in other media, such as movies (Transcendence), television series (the Ancients of Stargate SG-1), manga and anime (Ghost in the Shell), role-playing games (Rifts and Eclipse Phase) and video games (Deus Ex or BioShock).

== Transhumanist literature ==
=== History ===
Among the earliest works to portray transhumanism is the story of Frankenstein; or The Modern Prometheus. Victor himself is an early transhumanist character, attempting to overcome death through chemistry. The moral of the story is that man should not try to play God, serving as a criticism of the values of the transhumanist ideology that science and technology can be used to overcome the human condition. Following Mary Shelley's work, several of the stories by H. G. Wells also address this theme. The Invisible Man and The Island of Doctor Moreau both involve scientific men whose failed experiments in tampering with nature result in the story's conflict.

The cyberpunk genre is heavily influenced by transhumanism, generally criticizing the use of technology to improve human life by showing the consequences resulting in its misuse. Works such as Neuromancer, Do Androids Dream of Electric Sheep?, and the manga series Akira, all demonstrate worlds unbridled with technological advancement to improve the human race, used to reinforce divides among social classes. The idea of high-tech, low-life, results in rampant poverty frequently exploited by an upper-class made immortal through cybernetic enhancement. Author and academic Robert M. Geraci states that cyberpunk as a genre attempts to caution against transhumanism by exposing the problematic elements of the social economy that supports it.

=== Notable transhumanist authors ===
- Neal Asher
- Margaret Atwood
- Iain M. Banks
- Kage Baker
- Stephen Baxter
- Greg Bear
- Greg Egan
- Gregory Benford
- Marshall Brain
- David Brin
- Octavia Butler
- Ted Chiang
- Arthur C. Clarke
- Philip K. Dick
- Cory Doctorow
- Jacek Dukaj
- Warren Ellis
- Peter F Hamilton
- Michel Houellebecq
- Aldous Huxley
- Stanisław Lem
- Ken MacLeod
- Richard K. Morgan
- Ramez Naam
- Yuri Nikitin
- Richard Powers
- Alastair Reynolds
- John Scalzi
- Dan Simmons
- Olaf Stapledon
- Neal Stephenson
- Bruce Sterling
- Charles Stross
- John C. Wright

== In television and film ==
The science fiction film genre has always had a hand in exploring transhumanism and the ethics and implications surrounding it. In the first two decades of the twenty-first century, however, there was a surge of films and television shows focusing on the superhero genre. There are many superheroes whose stories are propelled or entirely result from dealings with transhumanism. From Iron Man to The Batman saga, there have been plenty of heroes who did not receive their powers naturally, and therefore represent the great leap human beings may take into improving their own condition.

Additionally, because these films represent a popular trend in the medium, they have been said to represent a glimpse into the ideological shift of western culture as a whole. The fixation on normal men and women improving themselves artificially becomes a widely accepted and celebrated idea.

- 2001: A Space Odyssey
- The 100
- The 4400
- 2B
- Agents of S.H.I.E.L.D.
- Akira
- Alita: Battle Angel
- Alphas
- Altered Carbon
- Andromeda
- Avatar
- Battlestar Galactica
- Beneath the Planet of the Apes
- Bicentennial Man
- Bio Booster Armor Guyver
- Blade Runner
- Blade Runner 2049
- Brainstorm
- Caprica
- Chappie
- Childhood's End
- Crest of the Stars
- Cyborg
- Dark Angel
- Dark City
- District 9
- Doctor Who
- Elysium
- Ex Machina
- Fringe
- Galatea 2.2
- Galaxy Express 999
- Gattaca
- Ghost in the Shell
- Hanna
- Her
- Heroes
- H+ (a web series)
- Humans
- Interstellar
- Jupiter Ascending
- Kamen Rider Build
- The Lawnmower Man
- Limitless
- Lucy
- The Matrix franchise
- The Melancholy of Haruhi Suzumiya
- Mobile Suit Gundam
- Mutant X
- Neon Genesis Evangelion
- Ninja Robots
- Orphan Black
- The Outer Limits episodes:
  - "The Sixth Finger"
- Johnny Mnemonic
- Pacific Rim
- Powder
- Power Rangers Operation Overdrive
- Power Rangers RPM
- Prometheus
- RoboCop franchise
- Stargate SG-1
- Star Trek: The Original Series:
  - "Where No Man Has Gone Before"
  - "Charlie X"
  - "Miri"
  - "What Are Little Girls Made Of?"
  - "Space Seed"
  - "Metamorphosis"
  - "Spock's Brain"
  - "Is There in Truth No Beauty?"
  - "Plato's Stepchildren"
- Star Trek: The Next Generation
  - "Hide and Q"
  - "The Nth Degree
  - "Q Who", "The Best of Both Worlds" and "I, Borg"
- Star Trek: Picard
- Star Wars
- Strange Days
- Terminator Salvation
- Terminator Genisys
- Terminator: Dark Fate
- Texhnolyze
- Transcendence
- Tron franchise
- Episodes of The X Files
  - "Killswitch"
- Watchmen
- Westworld_(TV_series)
- X-Men
- Years and Years

== In comics or graphic novels ==
- Akira
- Battle Angel Alita/Gunm
- The webcomic Dresden Codak stars a transhuman cyborg named Kimiko Ross who augments her body over the course of the strip's stories.
- The comic Transmetropolitan is about a transhuman society several centuries in the future that includes many cyborgs, uploaded humans, and genetically modified mutants.
- The dystopian graphic novels Upgrade and Monkey Room by Louis Rosenberg convey satirical views on the human march towards singularity.

== In musicals ==
- Be More Chill

== In video games ==
- Ace Combat 3: Electrosphere
- BioShock series
- Call of Duty: Black Ops III
- Caves of Qud
- Crysis series
- Cyberpunk 2077
- Detroit: Become Human
- Deus Ex series
- Half-Life
- Halo
- Metal Gear Rising: Revengeance
- Nier: Automata
- Punishing: Gray Raven
- Read Only Memories
- Shadowrun series
- SOMA
- Syndicate series
- System Shock series
- Wolfenstein series
- XCOM series

== In table-top games ==
- The role playing game Eclipse Phase takes transhumanism to a post-apocalyptic horror setting in which Seed Artificial Intelligences have gone rogue, introducing itself with the slogan "Your mind is software. Program it. – Your body is a shell. Change it. – Death is a disease. Cure it. – Extinction is approaching. Fight it."
- The GURPS Supplement Transhuman Space deals with a closer transhumanist future of the Solar System, describing a role playing game setting "in the year 2100".
- Another prominent example is the Warhammer 40,000 universe; Games Workshop's longstanding tabletop strategy franchise, which includes several video games and dozens of novels. While usually focusing on concepts like the loss of technology and the death of knowledge, and nowhere near what could be called a "utopia", the Warhammer 40,000 universe does depict a setting where transhumanism and even posthumanism are both quite widespread. Cybernetic and genetic modifications, human-machine interfaces, self-aware computer "spirits" (advanced AIs), ubiquitous space travel and even true posthuman "gods" are all quite prominent and featured throughout. The main protagonists of many novels and campaigns, the Imperial Space Marines, are normal human men who have been so vastly augmented and changed by technology that they are no longer Homo sapiens but a different new species. One of major playable factions, the alien Necrons, have completely transformed their bodies into ageless robot bodies tens of millions of years before the setting's main events. A faction allied with the Imperium, the Cult of Mechanicus, is a religious organization of machine worshippers, who treat cybernetic augmentation as a form of ascension. Unlike many transhuman futures depicted by authors on the subject however, Warhammer 40,000 is bleak, violent and filled with war and even with the existence of posthuman "gods" (like the Emperor of Mankind or his Primarchs) humanity is still beset on all sides by threats—including those of actual, supernatural gods.

== See also ==
- Biopunk
- Cyborgs in fiction
- Genetic engineering in science fiction
- Postcyberpunk
- Superhumans in fiction
- Uplifting in science fiction
- Utopian and dystopian fiction
