= Théah =

Théah is the fictional world created for the 7th Sea tabletop roleplaying game and collectible card game, created by John Wick and Jennifer Wick. It is based on an alternate version of early modern Europe with nations matching different periods and legends. There is also an undercurrent of secret societies based on real world and fictional sources. The 7th Sea role-playing game is centered on the swashbuckling genre.

== Nations of Théah ==
Avalon
The England of Théah is based equally on Elizabethan England and the Arthurian legends. Queen Elaine rules the Three Kingdoms (Avalon, Innismore, and the Highland Marches) from the mystical city of Carleon using the symbol of the Graal to represent her unified rule.
Castille
The Spain of Théah is the stronghold of the Vaticine church (more Gnostic than Catholic) where the masked El Vago fights the injustice of the Inquisition.
Eisen
The Seven Kingdoms of Théah's equivalent to the various nation-states that would become Germany were once united into a Holy Roman Empire but now lie war-torn and divided after a religious-based civil war equivalent to the Thirty Years' War.
Montaigne
The France of Théah was home to the decadent empire of the glorious Sun King Leon Alexandre du Montaigne but now having gone through the throes of a bloody French Revolution is the first republic in Théah.
Ussura
The icy parable of Russia lies on the brink of modernisation and the transition from the iron grip of the Gaius (like Ivan the Terrible) to the reformation of Catherine the Great.
Vendel
The Dutch and Scandinavian cultures are in schism between the merchant Guilds and the ancient warrior traditions of the Vestenmannavnjar (Vikings).
Vodacce
The Italian city-states are represented by the fracture and fractious islands of the scheming Merchant Princes all following the tenets of The Great Game.
Cathay
Théah's parallel to China and the Orient is separated from the rest of the world by the mysterious Wall of Fire.
Crescent Empire
Sand, scimitars and other archetypal Middle Eastern fare.

== Secret societies ==
The Knights of the Rose & Cross
A mixture of the Knights Templar with the Rosicrucians and a touch of the Masons, they try to inspire the populace with their heroic deeds.
Die Kreuzritter
The Black Crosses are the successors to the Teutonic Knights who fought in the Crusades and now fight a shadowy war against an alien threat.
Explorer's Society
The archaeologists and explorers of Théah are for any budding "Indiana Jones" as they explore the ancient Syrneth cultures that predate mankind.
Invisible College
Based on the real-world association of scholars that became the Royal Society, they work in secret due to the rise of the Inquisition.
Los Vagos
The followers of El Vago (Zorro) help to uphold justice and freedom in Castille under the persecution of the Inquisition
The Rilasciare
Seen as small collections of anarchists and troublemakers, the group is far older and more organised than anyone realises.
Sophia's Daughters
Descendants of an ancient Sidhe bloodline, the group are secret guardians of Théah with powers of foresight and manipulation.
Novus Ordum Mundi
The evil overlord club is a collection of some of the most villainous members of Théan society who have schemed and manipulated for many centuries.
The Rye Grin
A new organization founded during the Montaigne Revolution trying to save innocents from the guillotine.
