= 7th Sea (role-playing game) =

Tabletop fantasy role-playing game

- Cover for 7th Sea Game Master's Guide; Polish edition Illustration by Terese Nielsen (1999)
- Designers: Jennifer Mahr (Note: Credited as Jennifer Wick in the first edition.); John Wick; Kevin Wilson
- Publishers: Chaosium; John Wick Presents; Alderac Entertainment Group
- Publication: 1999
- Genres: Swashbuckling, sorcery
- Systems: Roll-and-Keep system, later d20 System

7th Sea is a "swashbuckling and sorcery"-themed tabletop role-playing game by John Wick. It is set in the fictional world of Théah, a fantasy version of 17th century Earth. Originally published by AEG, 7th Sea is currently published by Chaosium. The game won an Origins Award in 2000 and six ENNIE Awards in 2017.

== History ==
Alderac Entertainment Group published the Game Master's Guide and Player's Guide for Seventh Sea in April 1999 in a lay-flat binding. Originally 7th Sea materials were published using a d10 (roll-and-keep) dice system. The game was fairly well received. Some of the game's later supplements included information about the game's world that affected its flavor, including an extensive and rather Lovecraftian background to sorcery. One boxed set was Freiburg.

In 2001, Studio G published two comic books: 7th Sea – Absolution and 7th Sea: Prelude to Ruin.

In 2004, Alderac switched to the d20 System and re-branded the game to Swashbuckling Adventures. After poor sales of the three Swashbuckling Adventure d20 books, a series of hybrid books were published which supported both the d20 system and the d10 system. Alderac no longer publishes books for the system although a series of electronic books has been released by volunteer writers through the AEG website.

In 2015, Alderac Entertainment Group announced that they had entered into a deal with John Wick Presents, effectively transferring the publication rights for 7th Sea to John Wick. AEG still retained limited rights to publish undisclosed products. Wick successfully crowd-funded the campaign of the second edition of the game on Kickstarter on March 13, 2016, with the first book – the new core rules – coming out in June of that year. Later that month, the 7th Sea Explorers' Society was launched on DriveThruRPG to allow fans to self-publish material for the setting.

On November 12, 2017, a separate effort raised money for 7th Sea: Khitai, the East Asian-inspired counterpart to 7th Sea. The rate of publication proved to be unsustainable, though, and in November of the following year Wick was forced to lay off his staff and defer further publication for the line.

On April 2, 2019, Chaosium announced that they had acquired the rights to the 7th Sea product line along with the Second Edition and Khitai Kickstarters from John Wick, including back stock of books published so far. Work on the product line has since resumed.

== Reception ==
In 2000, 7th Sea won the Origins Award for Best Roleplaying Game of 1999. The setting also inspired a collectible card game.

In 2017, 7th Sea won ENNIE Awards for "Product of the Year," "Best Game," "Best Rules," "Best Cartography," "Best Free Product," and "Best Supplement."

== Reviews ==
- Realms of Fantasy

== Publications ==
These are the books published for the current edition:

Core Rulebook (2016)
Core rulebook set in the nations of Théah.
Pirate Nations (2016)
New seafaring rules and places to visit in the Caribbean-themed Midnight Archipelago.
Heroes and Villains (2016)
Collection of 40 heroes and 40 villains to use as NPCs or pre-generated player characters.
Nations of Théah Volume 1 (2016)
Details Avalon, Castille, Montaigne and Vestenmennavenjar.
Nations of Théah Volume 2 (2016)
Details Eisen, The Sarmatian Commonwealth, Ussura and Vodacce.
Crescent Empire (2017)
Introduces a new setting, the Middle-Eastern-themed Crescent Empire with five new nations: Anatol Ayh, Ashur, Persis, Sarmion, and the 8th Sea.
The New World (2017)
Introduces a new setting, the Mesoamerican-themed Aztlan Empire with three new nations: The Nahuacan Alliance, the TzakK'an, and the Kuraq.
Lands of Gold and Fire (2017)
Introduces a new setting, the African-themed nations of Ifri: Aksum, Khemet, Maghreb, Manden Kurufaba, and Mbey.
Secret Societies (2020)
Further details the secret societies from the core book.
Cities of Faith and Wonder (2022)
City building guide with chapters on several important cities in the setting.
Land of 1000 Nations (2023)
Introduces a new setting, the North American-themed Woven Land.

== See also ==
- Setting: Théah
- 7th Sea (collectible card game)
