= Campaign setting =

Fictional environment setting for a role-playing game

A campaign setting is a setting for a tabletop role-playing game or wargame campaign. Most campaign settings are fictional worlds; however, some are historical or contemporary real-world locations. A campaign is a series of individual adventures, and a campaign setting is the world in which such adventures and campaigns take place. A campaign setting is typically designed for a specific game (such as the Forgotten Realms setting for Dungeons & Dragons) or a specific genre of game (such as historical fantasy or science fiction), though some come from existing media (such as movies, shows, novels, or comic books). There are numerous campaign settings available for purchase both in print and online. In addition, many game masters create their own, which are often called "homebrew" settings.

Examples of major campaign settings include the Dungeons & Dragons campaign settings and the World of Darkness, and licensed settings such as the Star Trek science fiction universe, and the Avatar: The Last Airbender fantasy world.

== Types of setting ==
Some games and settings only appear together, such as Warhammer. Some games have multiple settings, such as Dungeons & Dragons or generic roleplaying systems such as GURPS or Fudge. There are also stand-alone settings that can be used for multiple game systems. Often these are developed first for works of fiction, such as the Star Wars universe or Middle-earth, then later adapted to one or more role playing systems. However, some system-agnostic settings are designed explicitly for gaming, such as Hârn.

Games scholar Nikolai Butler distinguished two types of campaign settings, homebrewed and official. According to games journalist David M. Ewalt, established campaign settings have the advantage of providing a wealth of material written by professional game designers. When creating a homebrew setting "you're on your own - but without limits and preconceptions", which can lead to more interesting games as the game master may be "more invested in the material and passionate about its development".

== Early history of genres (1970s-1990s) ==
=== Fantasy ===
The first role-playing settings from the early 1970s (such as World of Greyhawk and Blackmoor) were based on works in the fantasy literary genre by authors such as J. R. R. Tolkien and C. S. Lewis. As a result, common fantasy elements in campaign settings include magic and supernatural/mythological creatures, such as dragons, elves, dwarves and orcs. The worlds in these games usually have a level of technology similar to that of medieval Europe. Over the decades since, fantasy role-playing has evolved and expanded tremendously, developing sub-genres such as dark fantasy, high fantasy, and science fantasy.

Games such as Ars Magica popularized fantasy set within elements of real-world history. Subsequent games updated this concept further, bringing fantasy gaming into the present day with urban fantasy (such as Mage: The Ascension) or into the future with cyberpunk (e.g. Shadowrun).

=== Science fiction ===
Science fiction settings typically take place in the future. Common elements involve futuristic technology, contact with alien life forms, experimental societies, and space travel. Psionic abilities (i.e. ESP and telekinesis) often take the place of magic. Similar to science fiction literature and film, the game genre contains sub-genres such as cyberpunk, space opera, and steampunk.

Science fiction settings for role playing were introduced with Metamorphosis Alpha in 1976—dungeon adventuring on a "lost starship"—and in 1977 soon followed with Traveller, a space opera game. Its Third Imperium setting covered multiple worlds and alien races. Gamma World, introduced in 1978, explored the replacement of traditional elements of fantasy settings with the pseudo-scientific elements of post-apocalyptic fiction. Due to the success of Star Wars, and the franchise's impact on popular culture, many science fiction settings were introduced or adapted during the 1980s. Such settings often involved detailed accounts of military and/or trading operations and organizations.

=== Historical ===
Historical games are set in the past of Earth. Historical settings explored in 1980s-1990s roleplaying games include Pendragon (Arthurian), Sengoku (Japanese warring states), Recon (Vietnam War), and Tibet (historical Tibet).

=== Horror ===
Horror settings such as Call of Cthulhu were first introduced in the early 1980s, creating a hybrid of fantasy horror and modern thrillers. These settings tended to focus on organizations and societies in which generally normal people fight against malevolent supernatural entities. Another style of horror game reversed the roles, with player characters acting as supernatural creatures, such as vampires and werewolves. This style was popularized in the 1990s by White Wolf's Vampire: The Masquerade and World of Darkness. Early campaign settings that combine horror and fantasy elements include the Dungeons & Dragons settings Ravenloft and Ghostwalk. The D&D Heroes of Horror sourcebook also provided ways to emphasize horror elements within a more typical fantasy milieu.

== See also ==
- Fantasy world
- List of campaign settings
- List of fictional universes
- Campaign (role-playing games)
