= Sword and Sorcery Studios =

Role-playing game company

- Company type: Imprint
- Industry: Role-playing games
- Founded: 2000
- Defunct: 2008
- Headquarters: Stone Mountain, GA
- Products: d20 System materials, EverQuest RPG, Warcraft RPG
- Parent: White Wolf, Inc.
- Website: www.sword-sorcery.com

Sword and Sorcery Studios (S&SS) was an imprint of White Wolf, Inc., used to publish its d20 System & Open Gaming License material in from 2000 to 2008. The imprint also acted as publisher for other small press game developers, such as Monte Cook's company, Malhavoc Press, and Necromancer Games.

== History ==
The leadship at White Wolf Publishing saw the massive potential for the d20 System in the roleplaying industry, so they formed Sword & Sorcery Studio — a new department dedicated to production of d20 products. White Wolf wanted an expert in the legal and mechanical issues involved with the d20 trademark license, so they asked Necromancer Games to help form the "Sword & Sorcery" imprint, to publish both the books of Sword & Sorcery Studio and those of Necromancer Games. This partnership was announced on September 13, 2000.

When this partnership was announced, White Wolf also stated that Sword & Sorcery Studio was involved as a third partner was involved, although it was actually just the White Wolf d20 content division, but did give its name to the Sword & Sorcery d20 imprint. White Wolf produced the first book for Sword & Sorcery, the Creature Collection (2000) monster book which was assembled by Clark Peterson and Bill Webb of Necromancer Games, and written by White Wolf staffers.

== Products ==
- d20 Sword & Sorcery series – d20 system/Dungeons & Dragons 3rd edition compatible sourcebooks
- Scarred Lands – campaign setting for Dungeons & Dragons
- Ravenloft campaign setting – the company held the license to publish the 3rd edition version of it.
- EverQuest Role-Playing Game – licensed pencil and paper game line
- Warcraft the Roleplaying Game – licensed pencil and paper game line
- Monte Cook's Arcana Unearthed and Arcana Evolved series
- Gamma World campaign setting for Dungeons & Dragons
