= Sterling Hershey =

American game designer

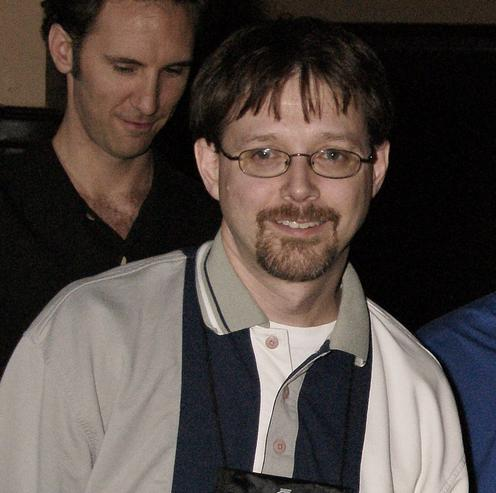
- Occupations: Architect & Author
- Writing career
- Subject: Role-playing games
- Notable work: Star Wars: The Roleplaying Game
- Website: blogs.starwars.com/silverforce

Sterling Hershey is a full-time architect and freelance game designer, who has worked on three different incarnations of the Star Wars role-playing game for West End Games, Wizards of the Coast and Fantasy Flight Games, and also on the Star Wars Miniatures game. He has pursued freelance writing and cartography work since the early 1990s.

His Dungeons & Dragons credits include Monster Manual V (2007) and Monster Vault (2010).

His screen name is SilverForce on both StarWars.com and the Wizards boards.

== Star Wars bibliography ==
=== Books ===
==== Star Wars d6 - West End Games ====
- Flashpoint! Brak Sector
- Shadows of the Empire Planets Guide
- The Kathol Rift
- Hideouts & Strongholds
- The Far Orbit Project (cartographer)

==== Star Wars Saga Edition ====
- Knights of the Old Republic Campaign Guide
- Force Unleashed Campaign Guide
- The Clone Wars Campaign Guide
- Legacy Era Campaign Guide
- Rebellion Era Campaign Guide
- Scavenger's Guide to Droids

==== Star Wars Roleplaying Game ====
- Age of Rebellion, 2014
- Force and Destiny, 2015

=== Articles ===
- Talnar's Rescue
- Raiding Sunfire Outpost
- Han Solo vs. the Death Star
- Talnar's Tatooine Traitor
- Droidworks Assault
- Hired Guns
- Repel Boarders
- Execute Order 66
- Vader's Pursuit
- Tusken Rustlers
- Power Beyond Belief
- The Core of Corruption
- Iridonian Darkness
- 25 to Rescue

== Media Mentions ==
Sterling Hershey has appeared in the following newspaper and magazine articles, websites and podcasts.

=== Podcasts ===
- Order 66 podcast: Sterling has appeared on the following twelve episodes discussing aspects of the Star Wars Saga Edition roleplaying game: September 1, 2008 (Of U-Hauls, Fences and Silver Chocolate), January 12, 2009 (One Year of the Big O!), March 22, 2009 (Three Men and a Little Legacy).
