= Arrow Films =

British film distributor

- Industry: Film distribution
- Founded: 1991; 35 years ago in Hertfordshire, England
- Products: DVD, Blu-ray, Ultra HD Blu-ray
- Services: Arrow Player (subscription service)
- Owner: THG Ingenuity
- Website: arrowfilms.com

Arrow Films is a British independent film distributor and restorer specialising in world cinema, arthouse, horror, and classic films. Arrow Video is a boutique Blu-ray label, and sells Ultra HD Blu-rays, Blu-rays, and DVDs online. It also operates its own subscription video on-demand service, Arrow Player.

== History ==
Arrow Films was established in 1991 as a family firm in Shenley, Hertfordshire. While Arrow Films was the company's primary brand for theatrical releases, the Arrow Video label was created in 2009 specialising in cult and horror home video. In 2011, the ArrowDrome brand was created for budget DVDs. The Arrow Academy and Arrow TV labels specialised in the world cinema and Nordic noir genres respectively, but since 2021, each has been merged into Arrow Video. In the same year, the company launched Arrow Player, a subscription video on-demand service in the UK, US, and Canada.

Arrow began releasing films in the North American market in 2015. In 2016, Arrow partnered with Canadian distributor Unobstructed View (which was later acquired by Blue Fox Entertainment in 2024), allowing for film distribution starting in July of that year. As of 2018, Arrow operated in the UK, Ireland, the US, and Canada.

In 2018, Arrow announced it would be "streamlining operations" with the departure of long-time executives Tom Stewart, who had been Acquisitions Director since 2010, and Jon Sadler, who had served as Marketing Director since 2012. In April 2018, Arrow Video and FrightFest agreed to a one-year partnership deal, in which Arrow became the headline sponsor.

In 2021, Arrow Films was sold to THG plc (formerly The Hut Group) for £18.5 million. In January 2025, THG plc demerged its technology and logistics arm, THG Ingenuity, into a privately owned, stand-alone business.

== Reception ==
Arrow has been listed by The Guardian twice as their home video distributor of the year. In 2011, they listed Arrow as the Label of the Year, noting their release of Bicycle Thieves, Rififi, and Les Diaboliques while specifically praising their releases of horror films, where they "truly excel". The second time was in 2013 when they awarded Arrow Films "Label of the Year", noting their releases of Lifeforce and releases of television shows such as Borgen and The Killing as highlights.

Camera Obscura: The Walerian Borowczyk Collection was voted the best home video release of 2014 by several publications, including Sight and Sound and Little White Lies, and won the Focal International Award for Best Archival Restoration Project and the Cinema Ritrovato Award for Best DVD Series/Best Box.

In 2016, Arrow Video won at the Reaper Awards, with Arrow's special addition of The Stuff receiving the award for "Best Box Art".

In 2021, Arrow Video won two Home Entertainment Awards from Media Play News, with Arrow's limited-edition of Tremors winning "Best Extras/Bonus Material" and Arrow's Gamera: The Complete Collection winning "Best Box Art".
