= Reaper Award =

Annual Awards Show

- Awarded for: Direct-to-video horror films
- Sponsored by: Dread Central; Home Media Magazine
- Location: Hollywood Roosevelt Hotel
- Country: United States
- Hosted by: Steve Barton
- First award: 2009
- Website: http://www.homemediamagazine.com/awards/reaper-award-winners-through-years

The Reaper Awards is an annual awards show presented by Home Media Magazine and Dread Central to honor the best horror genre home video releases. Fans can vote online for their favorite DVD and Blu-ray releases in categories selected by the show's judges. Winners receive the "Grimmy Award", a hand-crafted Grim Reaper trophy.

== History ==
The first award ceremony launched at the Hollywood Roosevelt Hotel in Los Angeles, CA on October 13, 2009. The ceremony was originally closed to the public, but a limited number of tickets were later offered for sale. The pre-dinner cocktail reception was still reserved for industry insiders. It was held there again October 12, 2010.

Judges include Steve Barton of Dread Central and Ryan Turek of Shock Till You Drop. Past celebrity judges have included filmmakers Roger Corman and Mick Garris.

The award itself was designed and sculpted by FearWerx and EMCE Toys.

== Categories ==
=== Voted by fans ===
Unless otherwise noted, all awards were introduced in 2009 and continue to the present.

- Best Theatrical Disc
- Best Direct-To-Video Release
- Best Catalog/Re-release
- Best Collection (2012–)
- Best TV on disc
- Best Indie/Foreign Release
- Spookiest Kidvid (2012–)
- Best Extras (2011–)
- Best Packaging
- Best Box Art (2011–)
- Best Big Bad (2011–)
- Best Kill (2011–)
- Best Line (2011–)
- Best Blu-ray (2009–2010)
- Best of Genre (2009)
- Best Remastering (2009)
- Most Anticipated (2010–)

=== Voted by judges ===
In addition to the fan-vote categories, the judges select a Best in Show. Previous winners include:

- Hellraiser: Box Set (2009)
- Never Sleep Again: The Elm Street Legacy (2010)
- Alien Anthology (2011)
- The Walking Dead: The Complete First Season – Special Edition (2012)
- The Cabin in the Woods (2013)

Two lifetime achievement awards have been given out:

- Michael Felsher, owner of Red Shirt Pictures (2009)
- Tom Holland (2010)
