= List of Star Wars role-playing games =

A Star Wars role-playing game is a role-playing game or role-playing video game set in the fictional Star Wars universe.

== Tabletop role-playing games ==
- Star Wars: The Roleplaying Game, by West End Games (1987–1999)
- Star Wars Roleplaying Game, by Wizards of the Coast (2000–2010)
- Star Wars Roleplaying Game, initially by Fantasy Flight Games (2012–2020), and now by Edge Studio (2020–present) after parent company Asmodee moved the Star Wars Roleplaying Game license

== Role-playing video games ==
- Star Wars Combine (Browser)
- Star Wars: Galaxies (PC) (by LucasArts)
  - Jump to Lightspeed—Expansion
  - Episode III Rage of the Wookiees—Expansion
  - Trials of Obi-Wan—Expansion
- Star Wars: Knights of the Old Republic (Xbox, PC, Mobile, Android, Switch) (by BioWare)
- Star Wars: Knights of the Old Republic II - The Sith Lords (Xbox, PC, Mobile, Android, Switch) (by Obsidian Entertainment)
- Star Wars: The Old Republic (PC) (by BioWare)
  - Rise of the Hutt Cartel—Expansion
  - Galactic Starfighter—Expansion
  - Galactic Strongholds—Expansion
  - Shadow of Revan—Expansion
  - Knights of the Fallen Empire—Expansion
  - Knights of the Eternal Throne—Expansion
  - Onslaught—Expansion
  - Legacy of the Sith—Expansion
- Star Wars: Uprising (Android, iOS)
