= TI1 =

TI1 may refer to:

- The International 2011, a Dota 2 tournament
- Twilight Imperium (First Edition), a 1997 board game
