= List of Star Wars Roleplaying Game books =

This is a list of Star Wars roleplaying game books for Star Wars Roleplaying Game by Fantasy Flight Games.

== Star Wars Roleplaying Game [2016] ==
These universal items can be used with Edge of the Empire, Age of Rebellion and/or Force and Destiny rules sets.

- Rulebooks / basic sets
  - Star Wars: The Force Awakens - Beginner Game [September, 2016]: The game is set before Star Wars Episode VII: The Force Awakens, during the New Republic era. Box set includes the 48-page Star Wars: The Force Awakens basic rule book, a 14-piece Star Wars: Roleplaying Game Dice set, and a set of 8 Destiny Tokens. Also includes the 32-page adventure module book Discovery on Jakku and the following play aids: four eight-page pre-generated player character booklets, a double-sided map (obverse (2 maps): hangar bay of the Silencer / wreck of the Starlight Wanderer; reverse (1 map): Galactic Map with major trade routes and a sidebar with short entries on the planets Jakku, Takodana, and D'Quar and the First Order's Starkiller Base), and 49 character and vehicle tokens. The Beginner Game rule book is limited and lacks the full gameplay and character generation and development rules from the other three Core Books. No core book, Era sourcebook, or supplements are scheduled to follow.
- Accessories
  - Star Wars Roleplaying Dice [July, 2014]: A set containing 1 white Force die, 3 green Ability dice, 2 yellow Proficiency dice, 2 blue Boost dice, 3 purple Difficulty dice, 1 red Challenge die, 2 black Setback dice, and a set of 4 Destiny Tokens.
  - Star Wars Roleplaying Critical Damage Decks - A quick reference for Game Masters that details the results of a Critical Damage roll. Can also be drawn to randomly select a result rather than using a d100 roll.
• Star Wars Roleplaying Game: Critical Damage Decks
- Star Wars Roleplaying Game: Characters - Critical Injury Deck
- Star Wars Roleplaying Game: Ships and Vehicles - Critical Hit Deck
  - Star Wars Roleplaying Adversaries Decks - Contains stats for NPCs. Can be used as a quick reference by the Game Master, or to randomly select an NPC adversary when needed.
• Star Wars Roleplaying Game: Adversary Decks
- Star Wars Roleplaying Game: Scum and Villainy Adversary Deck
- Star Wars Roleplaying Game: Imperials and Rebels Adversary Deck
- Star Wars Roleplaying Game: Citizens of the Galaxy Adversary Deck
- Star Wars Roleplaying Game: Creatures of the Galaxy Adversary Deck
- Star Wars Roleplaying Game: Imperials and Rebels II Adversary Deck
- Star Wars Roleplaying Game: Hunters and Force Users Adversary Deck
- Star Wars Roleplaying Game: Imperials and Rebels III Adversary Deck
- Star Wars Roleplaying Game: Republic and Separatist Adversary Deck
- Star Wars Roleplaying Game: Republic and Separatist II Adversary Deck
- Adventures
  - Star Wars: The Force Awakens - A Call for Heroes: A sequel to Discovery on Jakku from the Beginner's Game. It is a 30-page booklet that is available from their website as a downloadable PDF file.
- Sourcebooks
  - Rise of the Separatists (Era Sourcebook) [May 2019]: Set during the Prequel movies (Star Wars: Episodes I, II & III) and the Star Wars: Clone Wars TV series (Star Wars: The Clone Wars (TV 2003–2005) & Star Wars: The Clone Wars (TV 2008–2013)) at the beginning of the Clone Wars era.
  - Collapse of the Republic (Era Sourcebook) [June, 2019]: Set during the events of Star Wars: Revenge of the Sith. Details the end of the Clone Wars, the decline of the Old Republic, the purge of the Jedi Order, and the rise of the Sith. Introduces new character Races, Careers, and Specialization Trees and details important NPCs of the period.
  - Dawn of Rebellion (Era Sourcebook) [February, 2018]: Set during the events of the Rogue One: A Star Wars Story movie and the Star Wars Rebels (TV 2014–2018) series, between the rise of the Empire and the beginning of the Rebellion.
  - Allies and Adversaries (Non-Player Character Sourcebook) [April, 2019]: Profiles and stats for over 130 NPCs. Details Rebels, Imperials, and assorted rogues, scum and villains.
  - Gadgets and Gear (Weapons and Equipment Sourcebook) [December, 2019]: Collects most of the weapons and gear from the Edge of the Empire, Age of Rebellion, and Force and Destiny lines, plus new content made just for this volume.
  - Starships and Speeders (Ships and Vehicles Sourcebook) [February, 2020]: Collects most of the ships and vehicles from Edge of the Empire, Age of Rebellion, and Force and Destiny lines, plus new content made just for this volume.

== Star Wars: Edge of the Empire [2012] ==
This rules set concerns life on the seedier and grittier side of society. It is set in the Outer Rim on the fringes and frontier of the Empire.

- Rulebooks / basic sets
  - Star Wars: Edge of the Empire - Beta Rules [August, 2012]: Softcover Core Rulebook contains the beginning adventure module Crates of Krayts. It came with five full-color character sheets and a sheet of Roleplaying Dice conversion stickers. Requires 4 six-sided dice, 6 eight-sided dice, and 4 twelve-sided dice of an appropriate size to make a full basic dice set.
  - Star Wars: Edge of the Empire - Beginner Game [December, 2012]: Box set includes the 48-page Star Wars: Edge of the Empire basic rule book, a 14-piece Star Wars: Edge of the Empire Dice set, and a set of 8 Destiny Tokens. Also includes the 32-page adventure module book Escape from Mos Shuuta and the following play aids: four eight-page pre-generated player character booklets, a double-sided map (obverse side: a cantina / reverse side: the interior of the Krayt's Fang - a Corellian YT-1300 light freighter), 35 character tokens, and 5 vehicle tokens. Downloadable PDF files of two additional eight-page pre-generated player character booklets are available from their website. The Beginner Game basic rule book is limited and lacks the full gameplay and character generation and development rules from the Core Book.
  - Star Wars: Edge of the Empire - Core Rulebook [June, 2013]: Hardback Core Rulebook with improved rules and corrected errata. Contains the 22-page beginning adventure module Trouble Brewing.
  - Star Wars: Edge of the Empire - Game Master's Kit [July, 2013]: Includes the 4-panel gamemaster's screen and a 32-page booklet containing the adventure module Debts to Pay and an article discussing hints on how best to use the Nemesis Character system for Star Wars campaigns.
- Accessories
  - Star Wars: Edge of the Empire Dice [January, 2013]: A set containing 1 white Force die, 3 green Ability dice, 2 yellow Proficiency dice, 2 blue Boost dice, 3 purple Difficulty dice, 1 red Challenge die, 2 black Setback dice, and a set of 4 Destiny Tokens.
  - Star Wars: Edge of the Empire Career Decks: Decks of cards that can be used as a quick reference tool for players and game masters. Each card shows one of a Career's Talents and can be used to remember what Talents a character has and how they are used. They can also randomize what Talents an NPC uses.
• Star Wars: Edge of the Empire - Explorer Career Decks
- Edge of the Empire: Explorer Signature Abilities Deck
- Edge of the Empire: Explorer - Fringer Specialization Deck
- Edge of the Empire: Explorer – Trader Specialization Deck
- Edge of the Empire: Explorer - Scout Specialization Deck
- Edge of the Empire: Explorer - Archeologist Specialization Deck
- Edge of the Empire: Explorer – Big Game Hunter Specialization Deck
- Edge of the Empire: Explorer - Driver Specialization Deck
• Star Wars: Edge of the Empire - Hired Gun Career Decks
- Edge of the Empire: Hired Gun Signature Abilities Deck
- Edge of the Empire: Hired Gun - Bodyguard Specialization Deck
- Edge of the Empire: Hired Gun - Marauder Specialization Deck
- Edge of the Empire: Hired Gun – Mercenary Soldier Specialization Deck
- Edge of the Empire: Hired Gun - Enforcer Specialization Deck
- Edge of the Empire: Hired Gun - Heavy Specialization Deck
- Edge of the Empire: Hired Gun - Demolitionist Specialization Deck
• Star Wars: Edge of the Empire - Colonist Career Decks
- Edge of the Empire: Colonist Signature Abilities Deck
- Edge of the Empire: Colonist - Doctor Specialization Deck
- Edge of the Empire: Colonist - Politico Specialization Deck
- Edge of the Empire: Colonist - Scholar Specialization Deck
- Edge of the Empire: Colonist - Entrepreneur Specialization Deck
- Edge of the Empire: Colonist - Marshall Specialization Deck
- Edge of the Empire: Colonist - Performer Specialization Deck
• Star Wars: Edge of the Empire - Smuggler Career Decks
- Edge of the Empire: Smuggler Signature Abilities Deck
- Edge of the Empire: Smuggler - Scoundrel Specialization Deck
- Edge of the Empire: Smuggler - Thief Specialization Deck
- Edge of the Empire: Smuggler - Pilot Specialization Deck
- Edge of the Empire: Smuggler - Charmer Specialization Deck
- Edge of the Empire: Smuggler - Gambler Specialization Deck
- Edge of the Empire: Smuggler - Gunslinger Specialization Deck
• Star Wars: Edge of the Empire - Technician Career Decks
- Edge of the Empire: Technician Signature Abilities Deck
- Edge of the Empire: Technician - Mechanic Specialization Deck
- Edge of the Empire: Technician – Outlaw Tech Specialization Deck
- Edge of the Empire: Technician - Slicer Specialization Deck
- Edge of the Empire: Technician – Cyber Tech Specialization Deck
- Edge of the Empire: Technician - Droid Tech Specialization Deck
- Edge of the Empire: Technician - Modder Specialization Deck
• Star Wars: Edge of the Empire - Bounty Hunter Career Decks
- Edge of the Empire: Bounty Hunter Signature Abilities Deck
- Edge of the Empire: Bounty Hunter - Assassin Specialization Deck
- Edge of the Empire: Bounty Hunter - Gageteer Specialization Deck
- Edge of the Empire: Bounty Hunter - Survivalist Specialization Deck
- Edge of the Empire: Bounty Hunter – Skip Tracer Specialization Deck
- Edge of the Empire: Bounty Hunter – Martial Artist Specialization Deck
- Edge of the Empire: Bounty Hunter - Operator Specialization Deck
• Star Wars: Edge of the Empire - Universal Career Specialization Decks
- Edge of the Empire: Universal - Force Sensitive Exile Specialization Deck.
- Adventures
  - Beyond the Rim - The Separatist treasure ship Sa Nalaor was believed lost, but speculation and tantalizing rumors of its location keep circulating in every dive and hideout in the Galaxy. The characters are trying to beat other crews of treasure-seekers (and perhaps, each other) to its resting place.
  - The Jewel of Yavin - A heist in which the characters strive to acquire a priceless corusca gem.
  - The Long Arm of the Hutt - A sequel to Escape from Mos Shuuta from the Beginner Game. It is a free PDF file that is downloadable from their website.
  - Mask of the Pirate Queen - The characters are looking to collect the bounty on the infamous Pirate Queen of Saleucami.
  - Under a Black Sun (Free RPG Day Supplemental Adventure): A booklet with Dice Conversion tables, Fast-Play Rules for Star Wars: Edge of the Empire, 4 pre-generated characters, and an adventure set on Corellia involving the Black Sun pirate syndicate. They were given away at retailers on Free RPG Day (Saturday, June 15, 2013). Star Wars: Edge of the Empire - Under a Black Sun is currently available for free download at the site.
- Rules Supplements
  - Dangerous Covenants (Hired Gun Career Book) []: Adds the Demolitionist, Enforcer, and Heavy Specializations.
  - Enter the Unknown (Explorer Career Book) []: Adds the Archeologist, Big Game Hunter and Driver Specializations.
  - Far Horizons (Colonist Career Book) []: Adds the Entrepreneur, Marshall, and Performer Specializations.
  - Fly Casual (Smuggler Career Book) []: Adds the Charmer, Gambler, and Gunslinger Specializations.
  - No Disintegrations (Bounty Hunter Career Book) []: Adds the Martial Artist, Operator and Skip Tracer Specializations.
  - Special Modifications (Technician Career Book) []: Adds the Cyber Tech, Droid Tech, and Modder Specializations.
- Sourcebooks
  - Lords of Nal Hutta (Hutt Space Source Book)
  - Suns of Fortune (Corellian Sector Source Book)

== Star Wars: Age of Rebellion [2013] ==
- Rulebooks / basic sets
  - Star Wars: Age of Rebellion - Beta [September, 2013]: Contains the adventure Operation: Shell Game. Includes one full-color character sheet and six pre-generated illustrated character sheets. Dice set not included.
  - Star Wars: Age of Rebellion - Beginner Game [April, 2014]: Box set includes the basic 48-page Star Wars: Age of Rebellion rule book, four eight-page pre-generated illustrated player character booklets, a set of 14 Star Wars Roleplaying Dice, and a set of 8 Destiny Tokens. Also includes the 32-page adventure module book Takeover at Whisper Base and the following play aids: a double-sided map, 33 character tokens and 7 vehicle tokens. The Beginner Game rule book is limited and lacks the full gameplay and character generation and development rules from the Core Book.
  - Star Wars: Age of Rebellion - Core Rulebook [July, 2014]: Hardcover version of the improved and corrected rulebook.
- Accessories
  - Star Wars: Age of Rebellion Game Master's Kit - Includes the 4-panel gamemaster's screen and a 32-page booklet containing the adventure Dead in the Water. Includes expanded rules for land and space combat.
  - Star Wars: Age of Rebellion Career Decks: Decks of cards that can be used as a quick reference tool for players and game masters. Each card shows one of a Career's Talents and can be used to remember what Talents a character has and what they do.
• Star Wars: Age of Rebellion - Ace Career Decks
- Age of Rebellion: Ace Signature Abilities Deck.
- Age of Rebellion: Ace - Driver Specialization Deck.
- Age of Rebellion: Ace - Gunner Specialization Deck.
- Age of Rebellion: Ace - Pilot Specialization Deck.
- Age of Rebellion: Ace - Beast Rider Specialization Deck.
- Age of Rebellion: Ace - Hotshot Specialization Deck.
- Age of Rebellion: Ace - Rigger Specialization Deck.
• Star Wars: Age of Rebellion - Diplomat Career Decks
- Age of Rebellion: Diplomat Signature Abilities Deck.
- Age of Rebellion: Diplomat - Agitator Specialization Deck.
- Age of Rebellion: Diplomat - Ambassador Specialization Deck.
- Age of Rebellion: Diplomat - Quartermaster Specialization Deck.
- Age of Rebellion: Diplomat - Advocate Specialization Deck.
- Age of Rebellion: Diplomat - Analyst Specialization Deck.
- Age of Rebellion: Diplomat - Propagandist Specialization Deck.
• Star Wars: Age of Rebellion - Commander Career Decks
- Age of Rebellion: Commander Signature Abilities Deck.
- Age of Rebellion: Commander - Commodore Specialization Deck
- Age of Rebellion: Commander - Squadron Leader Specialization Deck
- Age of Rebellion: Commander - Tactician Specialization Deck
- Age of Rebellion: Commander - Figurehead Specialization Deck
- Age of Rebellion: Commander - Instructor Specialization Deck
- Age of Rebellion: Commander - Strategist Specialization Deck
• Star Wars: Age of Rebellion - Soldier Career Decks
- Age of Rebellion: Soldier Signature Abilities Deck.
- Age of Rebellion: Soldier - Commando Specialization Deck
- Age of Rebellion: Soldier - Medic Specialization Deck
- Age of Rebellion: Soldier - Sharpshooter Specialization Deck
- Age of Rebellion: Soldier - Heavy Specialization Deck
- Age of Rebellion: Soldier - Trailblazer Specialization Deck
- Age of Rebellion: Soldier - Vanguard Specialization Deck
• Star Wars: Age of Rebellion - Engineer Career Decks
- Age of Rebellion: Engineer Signature Abilities Deck.
- Age of Rebellion: Engineer - Mechanic Specialization Deck
- Age of Rebellion: Engineer - Saboteur Specialization Deck
- Age of Rebellion: Engineer - Scientist Specialization Deck
- Age of Rebellion: Engineer - Droid Specialist Specialization Deck
- Age of Rebellion: Engineer - Sapper Specialization Deck
- Age of Rebellion: Engineer - Shipwright Specialization Deck
• Star Wars: Age of Rebellion - Spy Career Decks
- Age of Rebellion: Spy Signature Abilities Deck.
- Age of Rebellion: Spy - Infiltrator Specialization Deck
- Age of Rebellion: Spy - Scout Specialization Deck
- Age of Rebellion: Spy - Slicer Specialization Deck
- Age of Rebellion: Spy - Courier Specialization Deck
- Age of Rebellion: Spy - Interrogator Specialization Deck
- Age of Rebellion: Spy - Sleeper Agent Specialization Deck
• Star Wars: Age of Rebellion - Universal Career Decks
- Age of Rebellion - Force Sensitive Emergent Specialization Deck.
- Age of Rebellion - Recruit Specialization Deck.
- Adventures
  - Rescue at Glare Peak Box Set (Rebellion Day Supplemental Adventure) - Contains a 48-page Adventure / Star Wars - Age of Rebellion Fast-Play Rules booklet, three sets of play aids (each containing a mapsheet with three maps and 4 pre-generated character sheets) to run three one-shot sessions, a set of 14 Star Wars Roleplaying Dice and 8 Destiny Tokens, and a promotional Rebellion Day poster. Only available to participating retailers who applied to get them before August 6, 2014. The event was held worldwide on Rebellion Day (Saturday, September 13, 2014).
  - Onslaught at Arda I - A military campaign in which the characters are operating out of a secret Rebel base. Includes mass combat rules and new vehicle stats.
  - Friends Like These - The characters have to protect the planet Xorrrn and defend the secret Rebel shipyards there. Includes rules for creating and playing Mandalorian characters.
- Rules Supplements
  - Stay on Target (Ace Career Book) Adds the Beast Rider, Hotshot, and Rigger Specializations.
  - Desperate Allies (Diplomat Career Book) [May, 2015]: Adds the Advocate, Analyst and Propagandist Specializations.
  - Lead by Example (Commander Career Book) Adds the Figurehead, Instructor and Strategist Specializations.
  - Forged in Battle (Soldier Career Book) Adds the Heavy, Trailblazer, and Vanguard Specializations.
  - Fully Operational (Engineer Career Book) Adds the Droid Specialist, Sapper, and Shipwright Specializations.
  - Cyphers and Masks (Spy Career Book) Adds the Courier, Interrogator and Sleeper Agent Specializations.
- Sourcebooks
  - Strongholds of Resistance (Alliance Worlds Source Book)

== Star Wars: Force and Destiny [2014] ==
This rules set concentrates on Force-using characters and has careers and specializations for Jedi characters.

- Rulebooks / basic sets
  - Star Wars: Force and Destiny - Beta [September, 2014]: Softcover core rulebook containing the early draft of the rules. Contains the introductory adventure Lost Knowledge and comes with one blank full-color character sheet and six pre-generated illustrated character sheets.
  - Star Wars: Force and Destiny - Beginner Game [June, 2015]: Includes a 48-page Beginner's Game basic rule book, 4 pre-generated character folios, 2 downloadable character folio PDF files, a set of 14 Star Wars Roleplay Dice and 8 Destiny Tokens. Also includes the 32-page adventure module book Mountaintop Rescue and the following play aids: a double-sided map sheet (obverse (3 maps): The Valley, The Path to the Ruin, & The Ruin; reverse: The Temple), and 55 character and monster tokens. The Beginner Game basic rule book is limited and lacks the full gameplay and character generation and development rules from the Core Book.
  - Star Wars: Force and Destiny - Core Rulebook [July, 2015]: Hardcover rulebook with streamlined rules and corrected errata. Contains the introductory adventure Lessons from the Past.
- Accessories
  - Force and Destiny Game Master's Kit: Includes the gamemaster's screen and a 32-page booklet containing the adventure module Hidden Depths. Includes expanded rules for experienced Knight-level play, allowing you to start players off with developed Talents and Force powers.
  - Force and Destiny Career Decks: Decks of cards that can be used as a quick reference tool for players and game masters. Each card shows one of a Career's Talents and a hand of cards (or the whole deck) can be used to remember what Talents a character has and what they do.
• Star Wars: Force and Destiny - Guardian Career Decks
- Force and Destiny: Guardian - Signature Abilities Deck
- Force and Destiny: Guardian - Soresu Defender Specialization Deck
- Force and Destiny: Guardian - Protector Specialization Deck
- Force and Destiny: Guardian - Peacekeeper Specialization Deck
- Force and Destiny: Guardian - Armorer Specialization Deck
- Force and Destiny: Guardian - Warden Specialization Deck
- Force and Destiny: Guardian - Warleader Specialization Deck
• Star Wars: Force and Destiny - Warrior Career Decks
- Force and Destiny: Warrior - Signature Abilities Deck
- Force and Destiny: Warrior - Shii-Cho Knight Specialization Deck
- Force and Destiny: Warrior - Starfighter Ace Specialization Deck
- Force and Destiny: Warrior - Aggressor Specialization Deck
- Force and Destiny: Warrior - Juyo Berserker Specialization Deck
- Force and Destiny: Warrior - Steel Hand Adept Specialization Deck
- Force and Destiny: Warrior - Colossus Specialization Deck
• Star Wars: Force and Destiny - Sentinel Career Decks
- Force and Destiny: Sentinel - Signature Abilities Deck
- Force and Destiny: Sentinel - Shien Expert Specialization Deck
- Force and Destiny: Sentinel - Artisan Specialization Deck
- Force and Destiny: Sentinel - Shadow Specialization Deck
- Force and Destiny: Sentinel - Racer Specialization Deck
- Force and Destiny: Sentinel - Investigator Specialization Deck
- Force and Destiny: Sentinel - Sentry Specialization Deck
• Star Wars: Force and Destiny - Seeker Career Decks
- Force and Destiny: Seeker - Signature Abilities Deck
- Force and Destiny: Seeker - Ataru Striker Specialization Deck
- Force and Destiny: Seeker - Pathfinder Specialization Deck
- Force and Destiny: Seeker - Hunter Specialization Deck
- Force and Destiny: Seeker - Navigator Specialization Deck
- Force and Destiny: Seeker - Executioner Specialization Deck
- Force and Destiny: Seeker - Hermit Specialization Deck
• Star Wars: Force and Destiny - Consular Career Decks
- Force and Destiny: Consular - Signature Abilities Deck
- Force and Destiny: Consular - Niman Disciple Specialization Deck
- Force and Destiny: Consular - Sage Specialization Deck
- Force and Destiny: Consular - Healer Specialization Deck
- Force and Destiny: Consular - Teacher Specialization Deck
- Force and Destiny: Consular - Arbiter Specialization Deck
- Force and Destiny: Consular - Ascetic Specialization Deck
• Star Wars: Force and Destiny - Mystic Career Decks
- Force and Destiny: Mystic - Signature Abilities Deck
- Force and Destiny: Mystic - Makashi Duelist Specialization Deck
- Force and Destiny: Mystic - Seer Specialization Deck
- Force and Destiny: Mystic - Advisor Specialization Deck
- Force and Destiny: Mystic - Magus Specialization Deck
- Force and Destiny: Mystic - Prophet Specialization Deck
- Force and Destiny: Mystic - Alchemist Specialization Deck
- Adventures
  - Lure of the Lost (Star Wars: Force and Destiny - Beginner Game Bonus Adventure)
  - Chronicles of the Gatekeeper
  - Ghosts of Dathomir
- Rules Supplements and Sourcebooks
  - Keeping the Peace (Guardian Career Book) - Adds the Armorer, Warden, and Warleader specializations.
  - Savage Spirits (Seeker Career Book) - Adds the Executioner, Hermit, and Navigator specializations.
  - Endless Vigil (Sentinel Career Book) - Adds the Investigator, Racer, and Sentry specializations.
  - Disciples of Harmony (Consular Career Book) Adds the Arbiter, Ascetic, and Teacher specializations.
  - Unlimited Power (Mystic Career Book) - Adds the Alchemist, Magus, and Prophet specializations.
  - Knights of Fate (Warrior Career Book) - Adds the Colossus, Juyo Berzerker, and Steel Hand Adept specializations.
- Sourcebooks
  - Nexus of Power (Worlds Strong in the Force Source Book)
