= Twilight Imperium =

Science-fiction themed board game

- Designers: Christian T. Petersen
- Illustrators: Scott Schomburg; Brian Schomburg; Tyler Walpole
- Publishers: Fantasy Flight Games
- Publication: 1997; 2000; 2004; 2017
- Genres: Strategy
- Languages: English
- Players: 3–8^{*}
- Playing time: 5–14 hours
- Chance: Low (D10 dice and cards)
- Website: www.fantasyflightgames.com/en/products/twilight-imperium-fourth-edition
- ^{*} 7–8 players available with the Prophecy of Kings expansion for 4th Edition and Shards of the Throne for 3rd Edition.

Twilight Imperium is a strategy board game produced by Fantasy Flight Games and Asmodee in the genre of science fiction and space opera. It was designed by Christian T. Petersen and was first released in 1997. It is now in its fourth edition (2017), which has large changes over previous editions. It is known for the length of its games (often greater than six hours) and its in-depth strategy (including military, politics, technology and trade). As of 2024, its compelling game play and enduring popularity have seen it be hailed by Nerdist and Polygon as the "greatest board game ever made."

Since its release, the Twilight Imperium franchise has also expanded into six novels published by Aconyte Books, tabletop role-playing games such as Embers of the Imperium produced by Edge Studios in the Genesys RPG system, and spin-off games including Twilight Inscription and Rex: Final Days of the Empire.

== Game background ==
The game's premise is a large-scale space opera. It is set in the unstable power vacuum left after the centuries-long decline and collapse of the previously dominant Lazax race. The old galactic central capital, Mecatol Rex, located in the center of the map, is maintained by custodians who maintain the imperial libraries and oversee the meetings of the galactic council. Players assume the roles of rising empires on the fringes of the galaxy, vying for military and political control, until one finally becomes sufficiently dominant to take over as a new galactic emperor.

== Development history ==
=== First edition ===
The first edition of Twilight Imperium was conceived by Christian T. Petersen while working as an importer of European comics. Drawing from a background of working at a Danish game importer, Petersen designed, published, and assembled the first edition of the game single-handedly. The final version of the first edition debuted at the Origins Game Fair in 1997. Fantasy Flight set up demos of the game in a high-traffic corridor to garner more attention, and ended up selling out of all of their available copies in under two days.

=== Second edition ===
The second edition of Twilight Imperium was published in 2000. It was the first edition of the game to feature art by Scott Schomburg and Brian Schomburg. It introduced plastic spaceship pieces, as opposed to the cardboard tokens used in the first edition.

=== Third edition ===
The third edition of Twilight Imperium, published in 2004, was designed at roughly the same time that Petersen was also working on A Game of Thrones, and was desired to emphasize similar narrative development in the game play. He also looked to the mechanics of Eurogames like Puerto Rico for inspiration of how to represent complex mechanisms simply. This edition was praised for its complexity, full advantage of game elements, and "limitless replayabilty" and is considered by many to be the best iteration of Twilight Imperium. However it was criticized for its convoluted and bizarre ordered technology upgrade tree The game box proved to be so large that wholesale distributors had to purchase custom-sized shipping cartons in order to make them fit.

=== Fourth edition ===
Development of Twilight Imperium Fourth Edition began in 2015. The original plan for the game was to seek funding on the crowd sourcing website Kickstarter, releasing a product with an MSRP of approximately US$250. Ideas pitched for this version included featuring only the six original races but each with unique ship designs, as well as presenting Mecatol Rex as centerpiece figure instead of a tile. However, this plan was scrapped in the summer of 2016 as the features were proving too costly to create within their budget. The revised version included all previous species introduced into Twilight Imperium except for the Lazax introduced in the Shards of the Throne game expansion, and was released at Gen Con in August 2017. The game box significantly differed from other editions, being shaped taller and horizontally narrower. Fourth edition was initially released as a stand-alone game until the first expansion Prophecy of Kings was introduced in November 2020. A second expansion, Thunder's Edge, was introduced in October 2025.

== Components ==
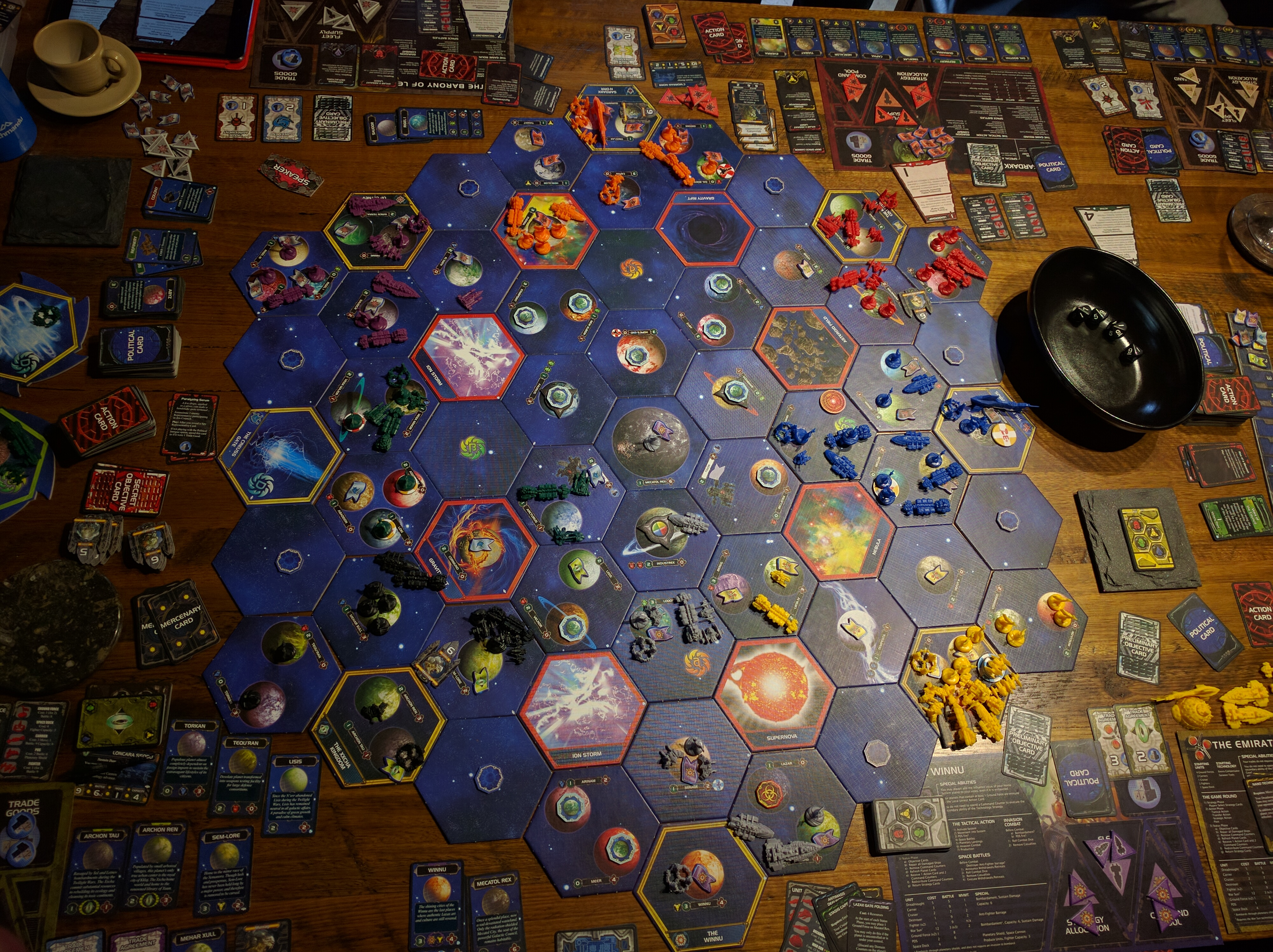
An early-to-mid game board state of Twilight Imperium, third edition. Games frequently have a large number of card decks, plastic pieces and cardboard tokens.

For the sake of continuity, all game rules and summaries reference the base game of Twilight Imperium: 4th Edition unless otherwise stated. Twilight Imperium consists of cardboard map tiles, cards, plastic units, cardboard counters, and player sheets. The map is built from hexagonal tiles, each showing up to three planets, empty space, or a red-bordered system containing an obstacle (with additional types added in the expansions). The centre tile is always Mecatol Rex, with the remainder of the galaxy built out in concentric rings.

Plastic playing pieces represent various starship classes and ground forces. Players are limited to the number of playing pieces provided with the game, except for fighters and ground forces. Counters are included for record-keeping, including command tokens, control markers, trade goods, and extra fighter and ground force counters. Cards are used to track planet ownership, trade agreements, technologies, public objectives, secret objectives, special actions, and policy voting agendas.

== Gameplay ==
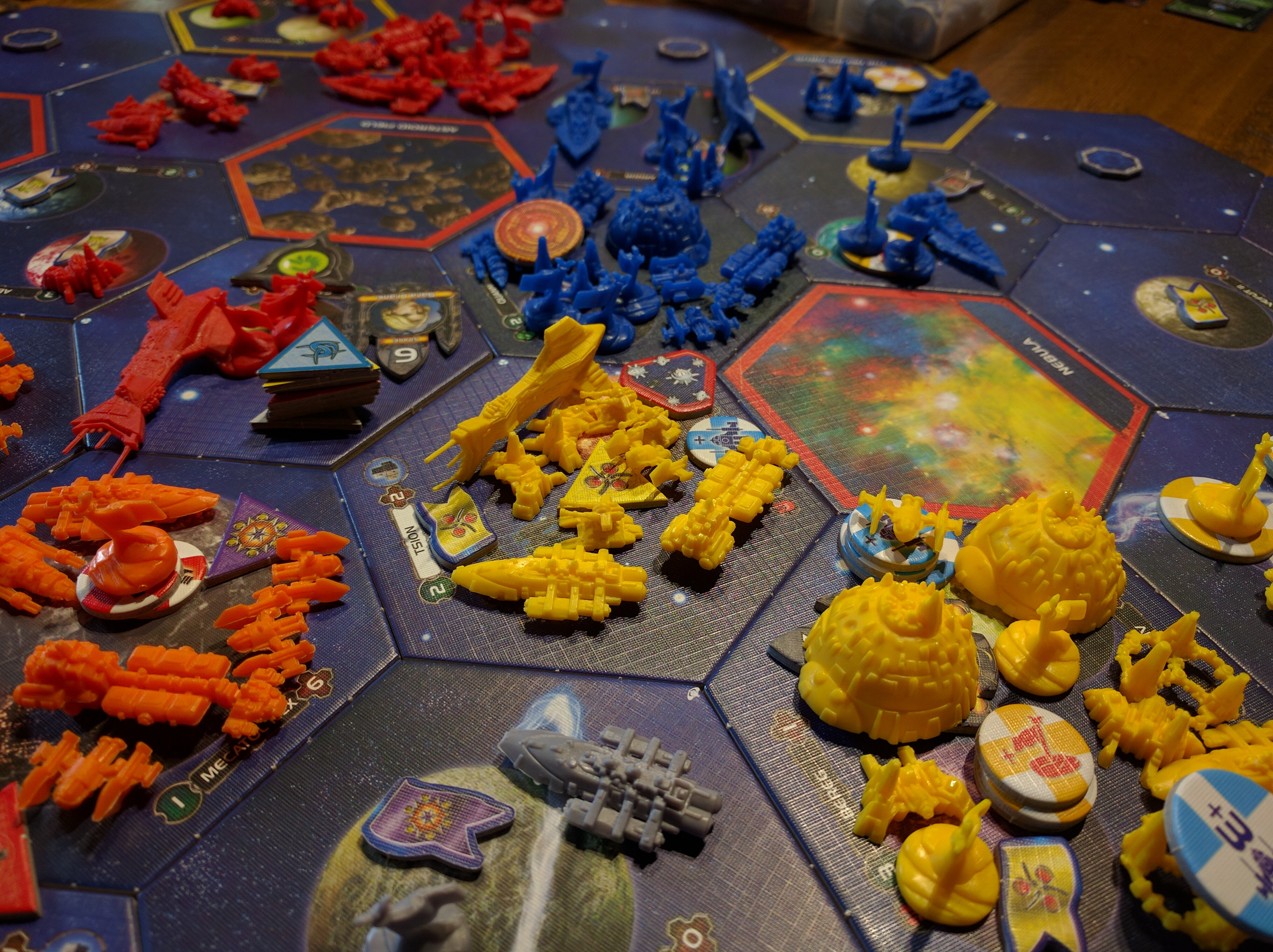
Game-play largely centres around units and their interactions on a hex-based map.

Three to six (eight, with 'Prophecy of Kings') players can play, with games typically taking more than six hours to complete (approx. 1.5 hours per player), although players new to the game can take longer. The game works on a 'victory points' system such that players earn points by completing a combination of public and secret objectives.

=== Setup ===
The game is setup around hexagonal tiles that constitute the game board.

Each player randomly selects a race to control. Either a pre-designed map can be used, or players can generate a map via a pre-game mechanic whereby each takes turns in placing map tiles to construct a galaxy map with Mecatol Rex at the centre and home systems around the periphery.

==== Factions ====
A Hacan diplomat, with a Federation of Sol soldier in the foreground

Players can choose from several alien factions (up to 30 in the 4th edition with both expansions) to play as. Anywhere from three to six (or eight, with the 'Prophecy of Kings' expansion) of these factions will appear in a game, depending on the number of players. Each faction has unique abilities, home planets, starter units and technologies. Additionally, each faction has distinct characters and themes, and they each specialize in particular areas of the game, such as trade, combat, technology, or politics.

Faction list below (Complexity listed from least complex i.e. 1 to most complex i.e. 3):

Game factions	1st Edition	2nd Edition	3rd Edition	4th Edition	Complexity
The Emirates of Hacan	✓	✓	✓	✓	1
The Federation of Sol	✓	✓	✓	✓	1
The Xxcha Kingdom	✓	✓	✓	✓	1
The Barony of Letnev	✓	✓	✓	✓	1
The Universities of Jol-Nar	✓	✓	✓	✓	1
Sardakk N'orr	✓	✓	✓	✓	2
The Mentak Coalition	Expansion	Expansion	✓	✓	3
The Yssaril Tribes	Expansion	Expansion	✓	✓	1
The L1Z1X Mindnet	Expansion	✗	✓	✓	1
The Naalu Collective	Expansion	✗	✓	✓	2
The Clan of Saar	✗	✗	Expansion	✓	2
The Embers of Muaat	✗	✗	Expansion	✓	3
The Winnu	✗	✗	Expansion	✓	2
The Yin Brotherhood	✗	✗	Expansion	✓	1
The Arborec	✗	✗	Expansion	✓	3
The Ghosts of Creuss	✗	✗	Expansion	✓	2
The Nekro Virus	✗	✗	Expansion	✓	3
The Lazax	✗	✗	Expansion	✗	-
The Mahact Gene-Sorcerers	✗	✗	✗	Expansion	3
The Argent Flight	✗	✗	✗	Expansion	1
The Empyrean	✗	✗	✗	Expansion	1
The Naaz-Rokha Alliance	✗	✗	✗	Expansion	1
The Titans of UL	✗	✗	✗	Expansion	2
The Nomad	✗	✗	✗	Expansion	1
The Vuil'Raith Cabal	✗	✗	✗	Expansion	3
The Council Keleres	✗	✗	✗	Codex	2
Last Bastion	✗	✗	✗	Expansion	1
The Ral Nel Consortium	✗	✗	✗	Expansion	1
The Deepwrought Scholarate	✗	✗	✗	Expansion	2
The Crimson Rebellion	✗	✗	✗	Expansion	3
The Firmament / The Obsidian	✗	✗	✗	Expansion	3
Total	10	8	18	30	

=== Rounds ===
Play consists of up to 9 rounds (though often less, depending on how quickly players gain victory points) -- and in the current edition involves four phases: Strategy, Action, Status, and Agenda, with the action phase taking. In each round, players choose a strategy card, which provides large bonuses to a particular gameplay mechanic and determines the order in which the players take turns during the round.

During the Action Phase, players take turns to perform tactical actions (building units, moving units, using strategy cards, using special action cards). Players are limited in the number of actions they can take during a round by their supply of action cards, strategy card, and command tokens, which are divided between strategy (used to access the secondary action of other players' strategy cards), fleet supply (limiting the number of ships that can occupy a system), and command pools (used for tactical actions). Players continue taking actions in turn order determined by their strategy card until each player has passed. At the conclusion of the Action Phase, players then perform the Strategy Phase, which involves removing command tokens from the board, repairing damaged ships, drawing action cards, and returning and redrawing strategy cards.

=== Units and combat ===
Units are purchased throughout the game using the resources from occupied planets and trade goods. Combat is fought in rounds with each unit rolling one or more 10-sided dice to attempt to score "hits" on the enemy player, who is allowed a counter-attack with their units before both players assign hits sustained by the other player to their units.

=== Politics ===
Politics and discussion play an important role in Twilight Imperium. Agendas are voted on during the Agenda Phase throughout the game, with each player's voting power being proportional to the quality and quantity of planets they control. Laws that are successfully passed can greatly modify certain game mechanics and thus change the flow of the game.

=== Scoring ===
At the end of each round, players have the opportunity to score victory points for public objectives revealed at the beginning of each round and/or secret objectives labeled "Status Phase". The first player to achieve the previously set 10 or 14 victory points is declared the new Emperor and wins the game. In the 3rd Edition after the 6th round, the game has a mechanism through an objective where the game has a chance of ending on any subsequent round and the highest scoring player at that point declared the winner.

== Online implementation ==
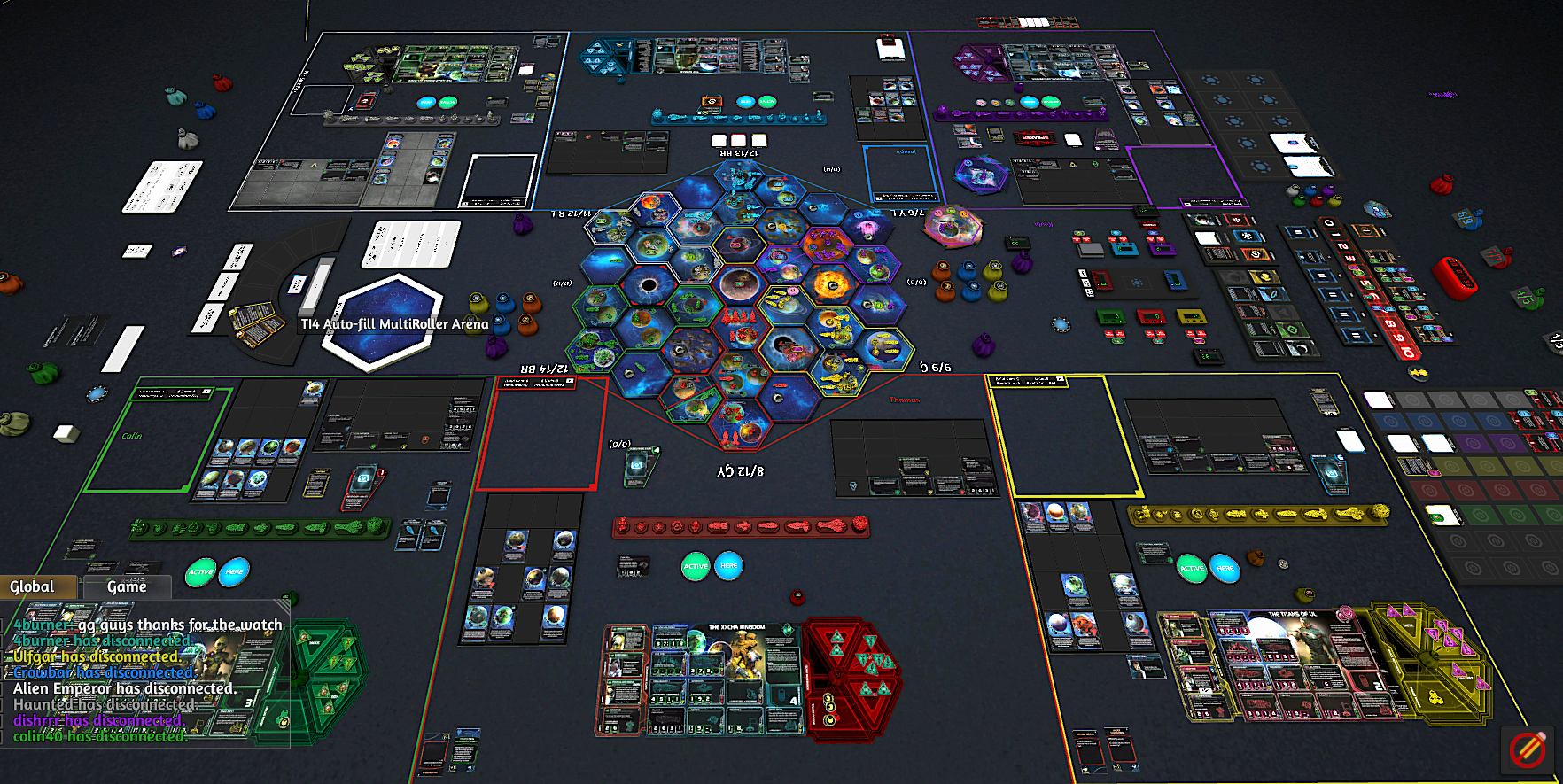
Twilight Imperium Fourth edition (using Prophecy of Kings expansion) as implemented in Tabletop Simulator. In addition to physics simulation of the cardboard and plastic components such that interacting is similar to using the board game parts, some game mechanisms are also automated.

A community-made implementation of the game was created in Tabletop Simulator. It stems from a fan-version of the third edition game called "Shattered Ascension" that was built in Tabletop Simulator in 2011 using the same components but a variant ruleset and gained a significant online community. After the publication of game's fourth edition in 2017, a similar Tabletop Simulator implementation was created in 2018 and is now used for online tournaments. In 2022, major development for this mod shifted to Tabletop Playground, due to its more active development team, use of JavaScript for modding, and controversies involving the Tabletop Simulator moderation team. There is also the website Twilight Wars that allows you to play Twilight Imperium: 4th Edition online with strangers, as well as a Discord bot called AsyncTI4. As of 2026, AsyncTI4 is by far the largest online platform for playing Twilight Imperium.

In October 2026, Board Game Area added an implementation of Twilight Imperium to its collection of playable games.

== Expansions, variants and optional rules ==
=== Twilight Imperium 1st Edition: The Borderlands ===
Fantasy Flight Games released an expansion called The Borderlands in late 1997. It was the first expansion for Twilight Imperium First Edition. It adds two new factions, several new action cards, and several counters for a variety of new game mechanics.

=== Twilight Imperium 1st Edition: Twilight Armada ===
Fantasy Flight Games released an expansion called Twilight Armada early 1998 (in tandem with Distant Suns), making it the second expansion for Twilight Imperium First Edition. Intended to replace previous ships for the 6 colors of the base game, it includes 300 miniatures.

=== Twilight Imperium 1st Edition: Distant Suns ===
Fantasy Flight Games released an expansion called Distant Suns in early 1998 (in tandem with Twilight Armada), making it technically the third expansion for Twilight Imperium First Edition. A controversial expansion for the game, it added uncertainty and strategy to the game, some counters, and other game aids.

=== Twilight Imperium 1st Edition: The Outer Rim ===
Fantasy Flight Games released an expansion called The Outer Rim in late 1998, making it the last expansion for Twilight Imperium First Edition. It adds 2 new factions, 13 new hexes which formed another exterior ring (hence the expansion name), and a few new game mechanics, with the intention of correcting some problems in the original base game.

=== Twilight Imperium 2nd Edition: Hope's End ===
Fantasy Flight Games released an expansion called Hope's End in September 2001. It includes newer components, a reimagined technology system that includes an improved tree, new action and politics cards, and new factions to play as.

=== Twilight Imperium 3rd Edition: Shattered Empire ===
Fantasy Flight Games released an expansion called Shattered Empire in December 2006. It includes two new sets of playing pieces and additional system tiles, expanding maximum player number to eight. It also introduced several rules-fixes to address common criticisms of the base game.

=== Twilight Imperium 3rd Edition: Shards of the Throne ===
Fantasy Flight Games released a second expansion called Shards of the Throne in May 2011, with additions including new factions, technologies, scenarios and units.

=== Twilight Imperium 4th Edition: Prophecy of Kings ===
Fantasy Flight Games released an expansion for 4th Edition Twilight Imperium in November 2020. The expansion contains seven new factions, some of which are based in the lore of Twilight Imperium's previous editions. It also brings in many of the systems and units that were first contained in 3rd edition. A new layer of technologies has been introduced giving more flexibility on how players choose their technology paths. The expansion also includes the Omega updates that were published in April 2020. It does not include any variant rules and is intended to be fully incorporated into the base game. It also adds new flavor to ground combat by adding a new infantry type called the mech.

=== Twilight Imperium 4th Edition: Twilight Codex ===
The Codex is the official web based publication, published by Fantasy Flight Games that highlights rule updates and showcases new content for Twilight Imperium Fourth Edition and eventually the Prophecy of Kings expansion. The predominant figure behind the codex is Dane Beltrami, the head developer of Twilight Imperium Fourth Edition.

=== Twilight Imperium 4th Edition: Thunder's Edge ===
Fantasy Flight Games released the second expansion for 4th Edition Twilight Imperium in October 2025. The expansion contains five new factions, plus a full official printing of the faction that had been released originally through Twilight Codex 3. The expansion also reprints and includes all other material that had been released through the four Twilight Codices. In addition to the reprinting of previous Codex material and new factions, the expansion includes more systems tiles (including a new anomaly type), technology Breakthroughs for every faction, an additional set of tiles that lay outside the normal galaxy set-up called The Fracture, and a series of 20 variant game scenarios of play called Galactic Events. Finally, an entirely new game mode has been created called Twilight's Fall, where players play Mahact kings from an alternate dark future and who build their own faction's capabilities through the drafting of individual ability cards.

=== Variant Rulesets ===
The base game and its expansions come with several optional rules and the counters necessary to play them out. The simplest variant is the long game, where the winner must score 14 victory points, rather than 10. However, most variants are intended to allow players to customize the game-play in favor of their preferred mechanics. For example, there are alternative variants of all strategy cards in the Thunder's Edge expansion which can drastically alter how players organize their turns. Some rule variants introduce new units, whilst others can introduce completely new mechanics, such as race-specific leaders and diplomats, or random encounters for the first player to land on each neutral planet.

== Differences between editions ==
=== Third edition vs previous versions ===
The third edition significantly changed many of the game mechanics. While some of the core elements remained the same, the game as a whole was completely revamped. Here are some of the more significant differences:

- In 2E, only the Hacan, Letnev, N'orr, Jol-Nar, Sol, and Xxcha were playable races. The Mentak and Yssaril were introduced in the Hope's End expansion as new playable races. The L1Z1X were present as non-player hostile invaders, introduced to gameplay via some of the events. The Naalu were completely new to the 3rd Edition (although it first appeared in the first edition expansion: The Outer Rim). While the races present in both games kept the same basic flavor and feel, the racial abilities changed between editions.
- In 2E, the game rounds were broken into phases: the political, production, movement, invasion, and technology steps. Each player had equal access to these phases every round. In 3E, these phases were largely spread out among the strategy cards, coupled with the new threaded activation sequence.
- In 2E, players collected credits as tangible money that could be spent from round to round. 3E's spending is mostly done by exhausting planets, though the trade-good concept does allow some limited form of savable liquid assets.
- In 2E, the only spaceships that could be built were cruisers, carriers, dreadnoughts, and fighters. 3E introduced destroyers (cheaper and weaker than cruisers, but more mobile than fighters), and war suns (expensive and powerful super ships).
- While most of the technologies were ported from 2E to 3E, many of the effects changed significantly (largely to fit with the 3E sequence better).
- Politics in 2E was done at the beginning of each game round by drawing a card from a political card deck, and voting on the agenda. Some of these cards were events which automatically affected the game in some way (such as introducing hostile L1Z1X forces). In 3E, the concept of "events" was removed completely.
- In 2E, players achieved victory by progressing along a fixed set of objectives, largely centered around the number of resources, influence, and planets controlled, as well as technologies. In 3E, players instead try to achieve victory points by completing objectives revealed during the game; these objectives could change from game to game.
- The tiles, cards, and playing pieces in the 3E are noticeably larger in size than their 2E counterparts.

=== Fourth edition vs previous versions ===
- Players now have 17 factions available to choose from, including factions that were only available in the expansions for earlier editions such as the Ghosts of Creuss, the Mentak Coalition, the Naalu Collective, and the Yssaril Tribes. The number of factions has been increased to 25 with the Prophecy of Kings expansion and the Twilight Codex Vol. III, and then 30 with the Thunder's Edge expansion.
- The phases of play in each round are now strategy, action, status, and the agenda phase. The agenda phase is added only after a player has taken Mecatol Rex.
- In the strategy phase, players choose a Strategy Card to use in the upcoming action phase. The strategy cards now control many of the fundamental mechanics that were tied to a phase in the 3rd Edition. As a result, players may be in competition for a particular strategy card, and a taking a particular Strategy Card may be necessary for a player to achieve certain objectives. The Strategy Cards confer abilities such as the purchase of additional command counters, changing who is the Speaker (and thus will get first pick of the strategy cards in the next round), refilling commodities for trade, building planetary structures such Space Docks and Planetary Defense Systems (PDS), researching technology, drawing additional Action Cards or Secret Objectives, or scoring an objective early (in the action phase, while all other players must wait for the status phase).
- In the action phase, players take turns expanding their empire by moving ships, building units, engaging in trade and combat, researching technology, making deals, using their Strategic and Action Cards, and attempting to complete the requirements for public and secret objectives. The player's initiative order (the turn order) is determined by a player's lowest number strategy card, e.g. a player with the leadership card (no.1) will go first and a player with the imperial Card (no.8) will go last. The action phase continues until every player has chosen to pass, and once a player has passed they cannot make any more tactical actions. Each strategy card has a primary and a secondary ability - the bearer of a strategy card uses only the primary and the other players may only use the secondary. So that no player ever misses out on the powerful abilities of the strategy cards, the bearer of a strategy card may not pass and end their action phase until they have used their strategy card, and all other players always have the option to use the secondary ability of a strategy card once activated, even if they passed on a previous turn.
- The status phase is a book-keeping and maintenance phase. Players score public and secret objectives in the same initiative order from the action phase (not clockwise from the Speaker), reveal the next public objective, draw action cards, remove and regain command tokens (and may redistribute command tokens among their tactical, strategic, and fleet pools), ready all exhausted cards (including the strategy and technology and planetary cards), repair any damaged units, and return the strategy cards to a common play area.
- The agenda phase has replaced the politics phase. Once a player has taken Mecatol Rex, it is appended as the fourth phase after the status phase to each round. In the agenda phase, players convene the galactic council on Mecatol Rex and vote on two agendas. Agendas are either Laws (permanent changes to the current game's mechanics, such as allowing all players to build War Suns without needing to research the qualifying technologies) and Directives (a one-time effect such as each player drawing a secret objective, or giving a victory point to the player in last place). Each player casts votes by exhausting their planets for its influence score (where each point of influence is one vote), and may spend as many as they have for the agendas, or abstain from voting. Players may not spend trade goods as influence for casting votes in this phase, but the voting (the active) player is free to offer deals - Promissory Notes, commodities or trade goods - to influence or purchase another player's vote. Players are also allowed to make deals and transactions during the agenda phase whether they share borders or not, allowing for the exchange of promissory notes, and commodities and trade goods. Once both agendas have been voted on, the players refresh all their exhausted planets so they have the resources and influence and technology specialties available for the action phase in the next round.
- The technology tree has been simplified. Rather than a confusing flow chart of pre-requisites, technological advancement is through four linear branches, and players can upgrade most of the available units by satisfying pre-requisites in the four branches.
- Trade has been simplified. Players now exchange faction commodities which become trade goods when another player acquires them. Instead of requiring trade agreements, the active player is now allowed to trade their commodities with neighbors (anyone they share a border with) during their turn.

== Reception ==
=== Reviews ===
- Rebel Times #4 (3rd edition)

== List of games ==
=== Main ===
==== First edition ====
- Twilight Imperium
  - Twilight Imperium: Borderlands
  - Twilight Imperium: Twilight Armada
  - Twilight Imperium: Distant Suns
  - Twilight Imperium: The Outer Rim

==== Second edition ====
- Twilight Imperium 2nd Edition
  - Twilight Imperium: Hope's End

==== Third edition ====
- Twilight Imperium 3rd Edition
  - Twilight Imperium 3rd Edition – Shattered Empire
  - Twilight Imperium 3rd Edition – Shards of the Throne

==== Fourth edition ====
- Twilight Imperium 4th Edition
  - Twilight Imperium 4th Edition – Prophecy of Kings
  - Twilight Imperium 4th Edition – Thunder's Edge

=== Spin-off Board Games ===
- Mag·Blast (two editions)
- Twilight Imperium: Armada
  - Twilight Imperium: Armada: Stellar Matter
  - Twilight Imperium: Armada: Incursion
- Rex: Final Days of an Empire
- Twilight Inscription

=== Role-playing game ===
- Twilight Imperium: The Role-Playing Game (1999)
- Embers of the Imperium (2023)
