= Genesys (RPG) =

Tabletop role-playing game system

Genesys Roleplaying System
- Genesys: The Roleplaying Game For All Settings (core rulebook, November 2017), the generic toolkit to play in any setting using the FFG Narrative Dice System.
- Designers: Sam Stewart and Jay Little
- Publishers: Fantasy Flight Games
- Publication: November 2017 (1st Edition of the 1st Rulebook)
- Genres: All
- Systems: Narrative dice

The Genesys Roleplaying Game is a tabletop role-playing game released by Fantasy Flight Games in November 2017. The book presents a generic version of a narrative dice system introduced previously in Fantasy Flight Games' Star Wars RPG, opening the system to be used in any type of setting.

== Game Mechanics ==
The Genesys role playing game is intended as a universal game system to be used for nearly any genre.

=== The Custom Dice ===
As in Fantasy Flight Games' Star Wars RPG, the system requires custom polyhedral dice, or dice modified with stickers to play. However, this game eliminated the white die, which was used to represent the force in the Star Wars RPG. The custom dice enable the dice having results on two axes; how successful the skill check was, and how lucky the attempt was with other factors–normally only one success on the pass / fail axis is needed to succeed. There are both positive and negative types of dice, which can be added to a roll represent advantages or disadvantages in a skill check.

== Official products ==
- Genesys Core Rulebook (November 2017)
- Realms of Terrinoth (April 2018)
- Android: Shadow of the Beanstalk (2018)
- Genesys Game Master's Screen (2019)
- Genesys Expanded Player's Guide (2019)
- Keyforge: Secrets of the Crucible (2020)
- Twilight Imperium: Embers of the Imperium (2023)
- Twilight Imperium: War for the Throne (2024)
- Twilight Imperium: Ships of the Shattered Empire (2026)

== Reception ==
Genesys was a nominee for the 2017 Golden Geek Award in the "RPG of the Year" category. Genesys was #5 on ICv2's bestseller list for role-playing games in Spring 2018.

Richard Jansen-Parkes, for the UK print magazine Tabletop Gaming in 2018, stated that "Genesys trades specialisation for adaptability, and will likely lose out in direct competition with the well-established masters of certain genres. However, if you want to buy one rulebook for your gaming group and run half a dozen weird and wonderful worlds without learning new rules, it may well be the new top dog of setting-free RPGs". As the system is setting-free, Jansen-Parkes commented that it is highly dependent on the Gamemaster to establish the setting; the Core Rulebook also includes detailed world-building tools and various guidelines for modifying the system for various genres. He highlighted that Genesys is built "on the sturdy chassis of [Fantasy Flight's] recent Star Wars RPGs" and called the 'narrative dice' system "elegant and easy to understand" as it "does away with virtually all the maths and number-crunching traditionally involved with tabletop RPGs".

Adam Potts, for TechRaptor in 2019, stated that "the core Genesys rulebook allows you to play roleplaying games in any setting you wish, like fantasy or sci-fi, cyberpunk or horror, and the emphasis is on a narrative experience rather than a stat driven roleplaying game [...] The Genesys core rulebook can be used for any setting and includes examples of six settings and six tones to get you started". He highlighted that the core of the system is the 'narrative dice' which means "when the dice are rolled, there are a variety of different ways to interpret them. Maybe you fail the task, but you find out something useful. Maybe you achieve the task, but are injured during the process, or maybe you fail the task and reveal a weakness to an enemy. The difference with this and a stat based RPG system is that you can easily interpret scale of failure or success". In the test session Potts ran, the players had mixed feelings on the dice system ranging from being a "real fan of what the narrative dice system is trying to do" to not enjoying the "propriety dice" and concerns that the "system felt overly clunky".

=== Reviews ===
- Cannibal Halfling Gaming

== Legacy ==
The game mechanics for the fifth edition of Legend of the Five Rings Roleplaying Game are built using a combination of the Genesys Roleplaying System and the "Roll and Keep" system from previous editions of Legend of the Five Rings.

The 2023 version of Twilight Imperium: The Role-Playing Game by Publisher Edge Studio titled Embers of the Imperium adapts the setting from the Twilight Imperium: Fourth Edition board game to the Genesys RPG system.
