= Geonosis and the Outer Rim Worlds =

2004 sourcebook

- Editor: Ray Vallese, Val Vallese
- Author: Craig Robert Carey, Jason Fry, Jeff Quick, Jeffrey Quinn, Daniel Wallace
- Illustrator: Tommy Lee Edwards, Kalman Andrasofszky, Daniel Gelon, Jeremy Jarvis, Langdon Foss, Marc Sasso, Mark Tedin, Matt Hatton, Mikael Naguchi, Vinod Rams
- Publisher: Wizards of the Coast
- Publication date: March 24, 2004
- ISBN: 0-7869-3133-7

Geonosis and the Outer Rim Worlds is a sourcebook for the Star Wars Roleplaying Game published by Wizards of the Coast on March 24, 2004.

== Contents ==
The book covers historical and major character information related to 26 planets of the Outer Rim Territories including Geonosis, Kamino, Ryloth, and Kessel.

== Reception ==
SF Site said the sourcebook "does its job" by giving players information to let their characters experience new worlds. The reviewer also welcomed the book's images from The Phantom Menace and Attack of the Clones.

== Reviews ==
- Backstab #48
