= The New Jedi Order Sourcebook =

Role-playing game supplement

The New Jedi Order Sourcebook is a 2002 role-playing game supplement published by Wizards of the Coast for Star Wars Roleplaying Game.

== Contents ==
The New Jedi Order Sourcebook is a supplement in which The New Jedi Order novels are adapted.

== Reviews ==
- Syfy
- Backstab
