= Rebellion Era Sourcebook =

Role-playing game supplement

Rebellion Era Sourcebook is a 2001 role-playing game supplement published by Wizards of the Coast for Star Wars Roleplaying Game.

== Contents ==
Rebellion Era Sourcebook is a supplement in which the era of the Rebel Alliance is detailed.

== Reviews ==
- Pyramid
- Backstab
- Gaming Frontiers (Volume 1 - 2002)
- Coleção Dragão Brasil
