= The Dark Side Sourcebook =

Role-playing game supplement

Cover art by Jon Foster

The Dark Side Sourcebook is a supplement published by Wizards of the Coast in 2001 as a supplement for the Star Wars Roleplaying Game, itself based on the Star Wars franchise.

== Description ==
The Dark Side Sourcebook is a supplement that gives details of the Dark Side of The Force. The book is divided into seven chapters:

1. The history of The Force and the evolution of the Dark Side.
2. How to design and play player characters who either are tainted by the Dark Side but are still able to change, or a character already lost to the Dark Side. New skills, feats and prestige classes are introduced.
3. How to run a campaign using the Dark Side.
4. Equipment, including the double-bladed light saber used by Darth Maul
5. Notable members of the Dark Side.
6. Evil creatures and aliens.
7. Various evil sites that can be incorporated into a campaign, and setting up a Sith-based campaign.

As several critics pointed out, players are not meant to become Sith Lords, and the rules punish their characters for using forces from the Dark Side. On the other hand, the non-player characters designed by the gamemaster who use Dark Side Powers are rewarded with greater powers.

== Publication history ==
WotC acquired the role-playing license for the Star Wars franchise and released the Star Wars Roleplaying Game in 2000. This was followed by several supplements, including The Dark Side Sourcebook, a 158-page hardcover book released in 2001 that was designed by Bill Slavicsek, JD Wiker and Cory Herndon, with cover art by Jon Foster and interior art by Lee Bermejo, Daniel Brereton, Tommy Lee Edwards, Doug Alexander Gregory and Ashley Wood.

== Reception ==
In Issue 55 of Star Wars Insider, Jesse Decker noted, "The Dark Side Sourcebook answers many questions, allowing players of the Star Wars RPG a chance to add ancient Sith technology to their games, fight powerful dark side villains, and add a touch of the dark side to their own roleplaying experience." Decker called the chapter on how to run a campaign "one of the most useful sections of the book ... packed with advice." Decker concluded, "Even if you're not a fan of the Star Wars RPG, The Dark Side Sourcebook answers questions about the mysterious dark side."

Writing for Science Fiction Weekly, Eric T. Baker noted that the book punishes Good player characters who use Dark forces and rewards Evil non-player characters who do so, writing, "So the DSS is probably best used as a sourcebook for a campaign's antagonists, and as such it is terrific resource." Baker concluded, "he strangest thing about this book is that it is a very clinical, cut-and-dried look at what is meant to be a terrifying and seductive brand of evil. The Dark Side Sourcebook contains all the facts game masters will need, but they are going to need to bring their own atmosphere to the table."

In Issue 33 of the French games magazine Backstab, Cyril Pasteau thought this book would be interesting to "those who want to play (or already play) the bad guys, the real ones, the corrupted Jedi ...[as well as] game masters who want to confront their players with the great figures of the genre ... [and] collectors and other fans. As for others, they might prefer to ask themselves if they really need it." Pasteau concluded, "the book is teeming with avenues to explore, simple but effective synopses, and tips for quickly imagining the start of a campaign with or against the Dark Side. The Dark Side will be enough for an imaginative game master."

Writing for Pyramid, Chris Aylott liked the book, writing, "there's enough in this book to please all but the most demanding Sith Lords ... All this information makes The Dark Side Sourcebook extremely useful for gamemasters, whether they are creating antagonists or tempting player characters." However, Aylott also noted that WotC was treading a fine line, commenting, "Even the most lawfully good gaming group is occasionally going to want to let its hair down, roll up a bunch of Sith Lords, and crush that puny Rebellion once and for all. Needless to say, this prospect terrifies Lucasfilm and Wizards of the Coast. Not only is it directly contrary to all the stated themes of Star Wars, but the idea of 'encouraging evil' must give the legal staff and publicity flacks nightmares ... So the designers have compromised. Yes, you're encouraged to run a Dark Side campaign, but only if the villains get theirs in the end ... Victory for the bad guys is not an option in the Star Wars universe." Aylott concluded, "It is well designed and colorfully illustrated — but also just a little bit disappointing. The designers present useful rules, but they dance away from the joy of playing the villain. Are a few evil laughs and mustache twirls really so much to ask?"

In Issue 82 of the Brazilian role-playing magazine Coleção Dragão Brasil, J.M. Trevisan wrote, "There's no shortage of new equipment (including weapons, vehicles, and ships), NPCs (including revised Darth Maul and Darth Vader character sheets), organizations, creatures, and adventure hooks." Trevisan concluded, "While it's perfectly possible to use Dark Side characters with just the core book, Star Wars RPG fans shouldn't pass up this excellent book. A more than worthwhile acquisition. But remember: the risk is entirely yours."

In Issue 4 of Black Gate, Jennifer Brozek commented, "I really enjoyed reading the text — it's well written, set up logically and sane in its approach to evil in Star Wars." Brozek liked the examples of Dark Side characters that were provided, writing, "[they] were both intriguing and thought provoking." Brozek concluded, "this sourcebook really did make an impression in me ... Over all the Dark Side is well worth the money. It offers a whole new perspective on the dark side of the Force, and gives gamers something truly interesting for their characters to fight... or become."
