= Shards of the Throne =

2011 board game expansion

- Shards of the Throne Expansion Box Art
- Years active: 2011
- Players: 3-6
- Playing time: 6-10 Hours

Shards of the Throne is the second expansion to the board game Twilight Imperium Third Edition, both of which were designed and published by gaming company Fantasy Flight Games. It was released in May 2011.

== Additions to the Game ==
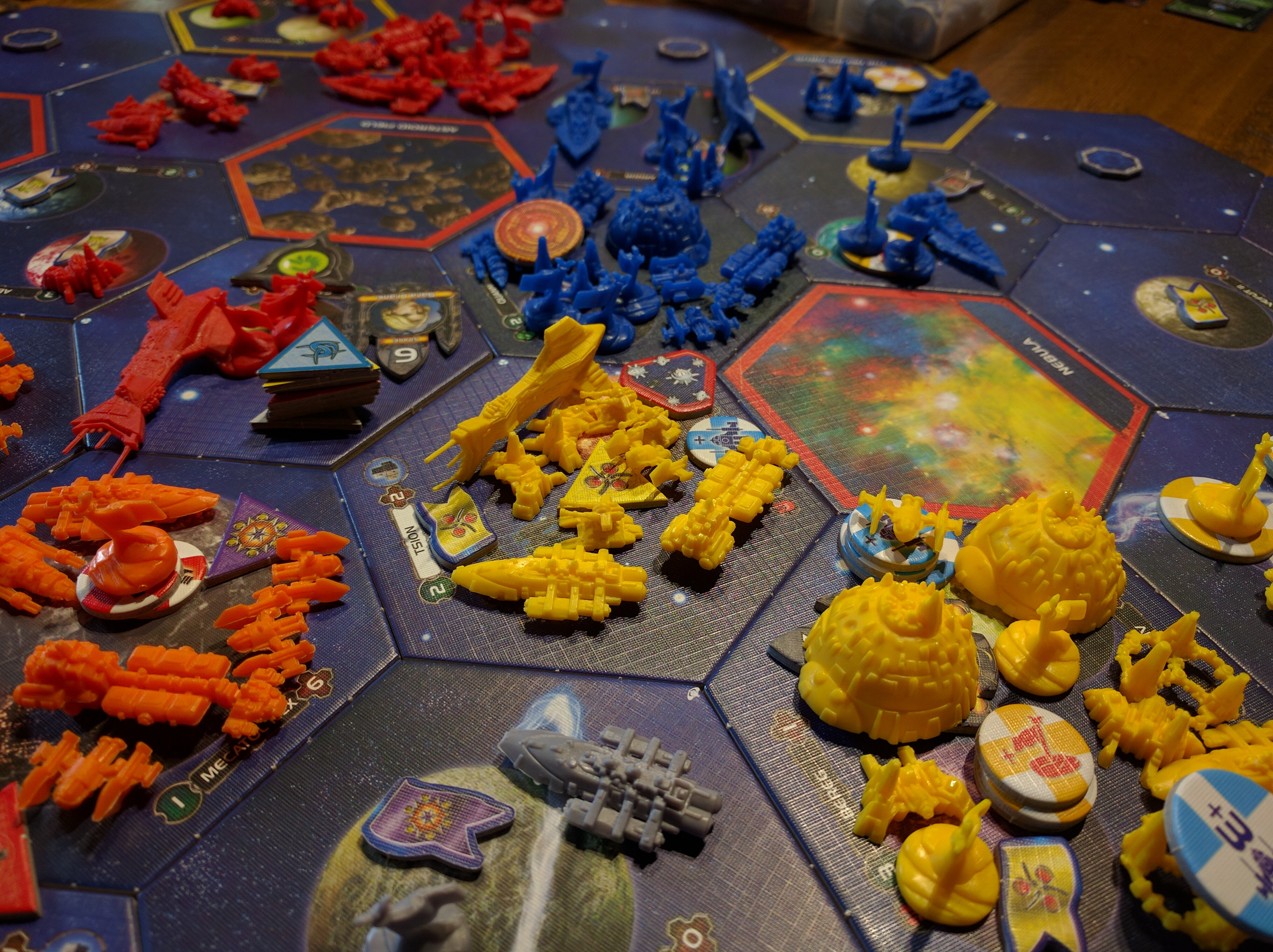
Game board containing a Flagship unit (long plastic piece)

Shards of the Throne adds 16 new system tiles, 3 new races, new strategy cards, 40 new Action Cards and 19 new Political Cards.

Shards of the Throne also adds many brand new options to be used in addition to the base game, all of which are modular; they can all be added and removed independently of each other, and none are necessary to play the game (with the potential exception of Mechanised Units, since one of the new races begins the game with one). These options are:

- Flagships
- Mercenaries
- Political Intrigue (including representatives and promissory notes)
- Preliminary Objectives
- Space Domain counters
- Mechanised Units
- Additional Race-specific technology cards

Shards of the Throne also contains a special pre-set scenario entitled 'Fall of the Empire'. This scenario has different victory conditions, and enables one of the players to control the ancient Lazax race.
