= Shattered Empire =

2006 board game expansion

Box art for Shattered Empire

Shattered Empire is the first expansion to the board game Twilight Imperium, both of which were designed and published by gaming company Fantasy Flight Games. It was released in December 2006.

== Additions to the game ==
Shattered Empire adds 28 new system tiles, 4 new races, 2 extra sets of coloured plastic pieces, 40 new Action Cards, 32 new Political Cards, 20 new Public Objective cards and 3 new Secret Objective Cards. It also includes rules for 7-player and 8-player games, in contrast to Twilight Imperium's maximum of 6 players.

Shattered Empire also adds many brand new options to be used in addition to the base game, all of which are modular; they can all be added and removed independently of each other, and none are necessary to play the game. These options are:

- Race-Specific Technologies
- Artifacts
- Shock Troops (originally seen in previous editions of the game, but omitted from Twilight Imperium 3rd edition)
- Space Mines
- The Wormhole Nexus
- Facilities

== Changes to the game ==
One of the largest changes in the game when Shattered Empire was introduced was the introduction of 8 brand-new strategy cards, which form an integral part of gameplay. The most noteworthy change among these was the removal of the Imperial strategy card, which was the subject of much criticism due to its giving of "free" victory points (which are required to win the game). Other changes include new objective cards to make the game slightly more combat-based, and new technologies to reduce the potency of large groups of fighters, which dominated the base game.

In addition, the concept of temporary victory points was introduced, in the form of artifacts, special objectives and certain political agendas. These added to the dynamic by keeping the scoring much more fluid than in the base game.

== New secret objectives ==
- 2 points - control Mecatol Rex with space dock, 2 techs in each color
- 2 points - control Mecatol Rex with space dock and 6 ground forces
- 2 points - control Mecatol Rex with space dock and 4 dreadnoughts
- 2 points - control Mecatol Rex with space dock and 8 ships
- 2 points - control Mecatol Rex and have all space docks and dreadnoughts on board
- 2 points - control all planets in another home system
- 2 points - destroy last space dock of a neighbor
- 2 points - control 6 planets with tech specialty
- 2 points - control 4 planets with same tech speciality
- 2 points - ship in each wormhole system

== New Stage I objectives ==
- 1 point - control 5 planets outside home system
- 1 point - spend 10 resources
- 1 point - spend 10 influence
- 1 point - spend 6 trade goods
- 1 point - 3 techs advances of the same color
- 1 point - techs in 4 colors
- 1 point - any 5 techs
- 1 point - control planets with all 3 tech speciality
- 1 point - 3 space docks
- 1 point - control Mecatol Rex

== New Stage II objectives ==
- 2 points - spend 20 influence
- 2 points - spend 20 resources
- 2 points - spend 12 trade goods
- 2 points - have 9 techs
- 2 points - control 10 planets outside home system
- 3 points - control Mecatol Rex and all surrounding systems
- 3 points - control planets with more combined influence than either neighbor
- Win the game - control the home systems of two other players
- Win the game - control 18 planets outside home system
- End the game - immediately upon revealing Imperium Rex card
