= Star Wars Revised Core Rulebook =

Star Wars Revised Core Rulebook is a 2002 role-playing game supplement published by Wizards of the Coast for Star Wars Roleplaying Game.

== Contents ==
Star Wars Revised Core Rulebook is a supplement in which player characters are from the Republic, the Rebellion, or the New Republic.

== Reviews ==
- Pyramid
- Fictional Reality (Issue 8 - Jun 2002)
- NAG (June 2004)
