= Star Wars Roleplaying Game (Fantasy Flight Games) =

Star Wars tabletop roleplaying game

- Publishers: Fantasy Flight Games (2012-2020); Edge Studio (2020-present)
- Publication: 2012; 14 years ago
- Genres: Space opera
- Systems: Narrative dice

The Star Wars Roleplaying Game is a tabletop role-playing game set in the Star Wars universe, first published by Fantasy Flight Games in 2012. It consists of different standalone cross-compatible games where each one is a separate themed experience. The sourcebooks support games set from the Clone Wars era to the original Star Wars trilogy era; there is limited support for the Star Wars sequel trilogy era. Since 2020, the game line has been maintained by Asmodee's subsidiary Edge Studio.

== Publication history ==
Star Wars Roleplaying Game Star Wars omitted from the titles
| 2012 | Edge of the Empire Beta Playtest |
| 2012 | Edge of the Empire Beginner Game |
| 2013 | Edge of the Empire Core Rulebook |
| 2013 | Age of Rebellion Beta |
| 2014 | Age of Rebellion Beginner Game |
| 2014 | Age of Rebellion Core Rulebook |
| 2014 | Force and Destiny Beta |
| 2015 | Force and Destiny Beginner Game |
| 2015 | Force and Destiny Core Rulebook |
| 2016 | The Force Awakens Beginner Game |
2017
| 2018 | Dawn of Rebellion Era Sourcebook |
| 2019 | Rise of the Separatists Era Sourcebook |
| 2019 | Collapse of the Republic Era Sourcebook |

=== Fantasy Flight Games (2012–2020) ===
Previous Star Wars roleplaying game publisher Wizards of the Coast declined to renew their license in 2010 after 11 years. At Gen Con 2011, Fantasy Flight Games announced they had acquired the license from Lucasfilm Ltd., and at the following Gen Con announcing Star Wars: Edge of the Empire for 2013, Star Wars: Age of Rebellion for 2014, and Star Wars: Force and Destiny for 2015, while releasing Star Wars: Edge of the Empire Beta and Star Wars: Edge of the Empire Beginner Game later in the same year. These releases revealed that the new RPG was based on Jay Little's Warhammer Fantasy Roleplay third edition, with the dice becoming the narrative dice system.

Age of Rebellion's beta version was released in October 2013, a beginner set released on April 25, 2014, and the final version of the game, the Age of Rebellion core rulebook, released on July 3, 2014. The third line of products, Star Wars: Force and Destiny, for playing Jedi characters, was released in beta in September 2014. In August 2018, the sourcebook Rise of the Separatists, set during the Clone Wars, was announced; it was released on May 9, 2019.

Also in 2018, Fantasy Flight Games published a 30th anniversary edition of the original Star Wars: The Roleplaying Game (1987–1999).

In 2020, Fantasy Flight Games announced that they were discontinuing their tabletop role-playing game lines. Parent company Asmodee then moved the Star Wars Roleplaying Game license to their subsidiary, Edge Studio.

=== Edge Studio (2020–present) ===
In October 2021, Edge Studio announced continued support of the Star Wars Roleplaying Game line via future reprints in phase one and new supplements in phase two. Edge Studio's RPG manager Sam Gregor-Stewart, former lead developer of Star Wars: Edge of the Empire, "hinted at the possibility of a new" Star Wars roleplaying game system. However, in November 2021, Edge Studio "told Dicebreaker that no standalone Star Wars RPGs are in development, despite the indication last month that it was working on brand new titles in the sci-fi setting".

In October 2022, ComicBook.com reported that "Asmodee has announced a new print run of several Star Wars Roleplaying Game era sourcebooks, ending a multi-year hiatus of sorts for the once-popular game". The titles to be rereleased in November 2022 were: Dawn of the Rebellion, Rise of the Separatists, and Starships and Speeders along with the game master's kits for Age of Rebellion and Edge of Empire. In December 2022, Edge Studio announced the upcoming reprint of eleven books including the Core Rulebooks for Age of the Rebellion, Edge of Empire, and Force and Destiny. The three entry level boxed sets for Age of Rebellion, Edge of the Empire, and Force and Destiny respectively were scheduled to be reprinted and released in December 2023.

At Gen Con 2026, Wizards of the Coast announced a new Universes Beyond program for licensed Dungeons & Dragons partnerships. This program will feature a Star Wars themed sourcebook in 2027. Outlets reported speculation that this indicated Edge Studio had lost the tabletop Star Wars license and that its Star Wars Roleplaying Game was finished. However, Russ Morrissey reported that Edge Studios announced in its Discord server that the company retains the license.

== Overview ==
Star Wars: Edge of the Empire
- Cover art by Scott Schomburg
- Designers: Dave Allen; Shawn Carman; Jay Little
- Publishers: Fantasy Flight Games
- Publication: 2013; 13 years ago
- Genres: Space opera
- Systems: Narrative Dice System
- ISBN: 978-1616616571

Star Wars: Age of Rebellion
- Designers: Sterling Hershey
- Publishers: Fantasy Flight Games
- Publication: 3 August 2014; 12 years ago
- Genres: Space opera
- Systems: Narrative Dice System
- ISBN: 978-1616617806

Star Wars: Force and Destiny
- Designers: Sterling Hershey
- Publishers: Fantasy Flight Games
- Publication: 2015; 11 years ago
- Genres: Space opera
- Systems: Narrative Dice System
- ISBN: 978-1633441224

The Star Wars Roleplaying Game is divided into various themed product lines which can be played as standalone games or as cross-compatible games:

- Star Wars: Edge of the Empire: for playing bounty hunters, colonists, explorers, hired guns, smugglers, or technicians
- Star Wars: Age of Rebellion: for playing rebel soldiers and freedom fighters against the Galactic Empire
- Star Wars: Force and Destiny: for playing Force-sensitives and the last Jedi Knights under the Empire's rule
- Star Wars: The Force Awakens: set prior to the events of the third Star Wars trilogy
- Star Wars: Rise of the Separatists & Collapse of the Republic: set during the Clone Wars; players can be Jedi, clone troopers and even work for the Separatists

== Supported fictional eras ==
Star Wars: Rise of the Separatists (2019) is set during the Clone Wars era at the beginning of the Palpatine regime. Star Wars: Collapse of the Republic (2019) is set during the second half of the Clone Wars and the waning of the Republic. Star Wars: Dawn of Rebellion (2018) is set during the ascendance of the Empire. It deals with the events at the time of the animated series Star Wars Rebels and the film Rogue One (2016), in which the Rebellion is divided into factions and is opposing the Empire just as it is consolidating its power.

The first three installments of the Star Wars Roleplaying Game are set within the time period of the original Star Wars trilogy. Star Wars: Edge of the Empire (2013) is set shortly after the destruction of the first Death Star, and deals with characters on the fringes of galactic space. Star Wars: Age of Rebellion (2014) is set around the time of The Empire Strikes Back (1980), and allows players to join the Rebellion. Like Edge of the Empire, Star Wars: Force and Destiny (2015) is set shortly after the destruction of the first Death Star and the death of Obi-Wan Kenobi, when the force sensitives and Jedi slowly start to re-emerge in hopes of rebuilding the Jedi Order.

The Force Awakens Beginner Game is set during the current era depicted in the film Star Wars: The Force Awakens (2015), with the adventure provided taking place just before the events of the movie.

== Game system ==
=== Characteristics ===
The characteristics are Brawn (physical power), Agility (physical precision), Intellect (intelligence and "book smarts"), Cunning (wisdom and "street smarts"), Willpower (endurance and focus), and Presence (charisma and attractiveness). Characteristic levels (called "ratings") range from a minimum rating of one to a maximum rating of six, although there is a ceiling of five during character creation. Each character race has different base characteristic ratings, though additional ratings in each attribute can be gained during or after character creation.

There are additional derived characteristics:

- Strain: determines how much physical, mental or emotional stress a character can take before collapsing.
- Wound Points: determines how much physical damage a character can take before passing out or slipping into a coma.
- Soak: protection granted by the clothing or armor a character is wearing and/or the character's natural toughness.
- Defense: resistance to melee and/or ranged weapon attacks and is granted by armor or certain Talents.

=== Templates ===
After determining attributes, the player designs their character using a species template. Each species has different racial characteristic minimums, maximums, and additional features such as talents or special abilities.

The player then picks a career, and then one of the three or more specializations of that career. Each specialization grants career skills, and a specialization tree grants specialization-based talents.

All the career skills listed under the character's career and specialization (whether chosen or not during character creation) can be bought for a flat point cost. The career skills chosen by the player are granted their first level free during initial character creation, but cost the same as other career skills when buying higher levels. Characters cannot buy a new career but may buy additional specializations - whether they are under their career or not. However, if a character wishes to buy another specialization, it costs less for one under their chosen career than for one under another career.

The universal careers are generic specializations that can be used by any of the core games. Some allow characters from one game to crossover to the others. Force Sensitive Exile and Force Sensitive Emergent allow veteran characters from Edge of the Empire and Age of Rebellion to become Force users and use the Force and Destiny game rules. Recruit allows Edge of the Empire characters to cross over to Age of Rebellion campaigns. They cost the same as if they were specializations under the character's existing career, making them cheaper and more effective than buying a specialization under a different Career.

==== Skills ====
There are three types of skills in the Star Wars Roleplaying Game. Knowledge skills cover intellectual pursuits, Combat skills cover confrontational actions, and general skills cover non-combat actions.

The game's rules assume that all characters have all the game system's skills at zero level if they do not have a level in it. The character's default skill level is equal to the skill's governing characteristic score.

Purchasing a level in a skill (called a rank) makes the character an expert in it. Regular skill rolls substitute a yellow 12-sided proficiency die for a green 8-sided ability die per skill rank. It can also add green ability dice if the character's skill level is higher than their attribute level. Blue 6-sided boost dice are added for advantageous events or if another character is helping the player character with the attempt.

Skill rolls are opposed by rolling a pool of purple 8-sided difficulty dice. Depending on the complexity of the task the character is attempting, it could range from one difficulty die for an easy complexity task to five difficulty dice for a formidable complexity task. Black 6-sided setback dice are added for disadvantageous events.

If the character is being opposed by an NPC antagonist while performing a task, then the dice pool is based on the NPC's opposing skill. The difficulty pool is created by adding a purple difficulty die for each green ability die the NPC has in the skill and a red 12-sided challenge die for each yellow 12-sided proficiency die the NPC has in the skill. Black setback dice are added if another NPC is helping the antagonist NPC to hinder the player character's attempt.

==== Talents ====
Talents are advantages that add flavor to a character and either grant bonuses, benefit allies, remove penalties during play, or penalize adversaries. They cost experience points to buy, and must be unlocked in the order they appear on the specialization tree. The further down the diagram, the more powerful (and expensive) the talents become. Each career specialization has its own specialization Tree. When the tree is all filled out, the character cannot buy any more talents from it. If the player wishes to obtain more talents for their character, then they must purchase a new career specialization and begin filling out that specialization tree.

Talents are split into two groups. Passive talents are abilities that are always on and can be used for the entire duration of the session. Active talents are abilities that require a difficulty roll to turn on prior to use, and in some cases can only be used a limited number of times in a given session. Some talents have levels and can be purchased more than once. The talent's levels stack, even if they are bought for different amounts of experience points.

=== Disadvantages ===
Disadvantages can be taken during character creation to offset point costs:

- Edge of the Empire has the obligation disadvantage, something the character is forced or compelled to do. The number of player characters in the group sets the base disadvantage number. The smaller the group, the larger the disadvantage level that each player must bear. The game master rolls percentile dice at the beginning of play to see which character's disadvantage will be used during the session. The character can pay off the disadvantage with experience points in gameplay.
- Age of Rebellion has the duty disadvantage, something the character wants to do. Levels of duty can be cashed in for contribution levels, which establish the individual or group's rank in the rebellion. It also can be used to grant gifts of equipment, vehicles, or resources.
- Force and Destiny has the morality disadvantage, which governs how close a Force-using character is to slipping over to the Dark Side. Unlike the other two games, morality is governed by a character's actions during gameplay. Conflict is generated whenever they choose to perform a morally questionable action or choose to use the Dark Side of the Force in order to power their abilities. Morality cannot be bought with experience points, instead a player wanting to change their alignment must actually role-play a more aggressive character to turn to the Dark Side, or perform acts of compassion to become a paragon of the Light Side.

Motivation is a character's guiding principle:

- In the cynical Edge of the Empire, it is an ambition, cause or relationship.
- In the idealistic Age of Rebellion, it is a quest, belief or personal connection.
- In Force and Destiny it is an ambition, cause or faith.

If a player uses the character's motivation during gameplay, they get an experience point bonus.

=== Dice ===
Polyhedral dice and Destiny Tokens (rear) used in the game

Using the storytelling dice from their earlier Warhammer Fantasy Roleplay (third edition) as its basis, Fantasy Flight Games altered the design to make a dice pool system that was more evocative of the Star Wars universe. It renamed the dice types, uses a 12-sided dice instead of 10-sided dice, and does not use the exploding die mechanic, and removes the stance dice.

The narrative dice system uses seven different types of dice. They use symbols rather than numbers and are interpreted on two axes: succeed / fail and lucky / unlucky. You can succeed, but have negative complications or fail but have positive advantages.

- Ability uses a green 8-sided die, and represents the character's characteristic level (one to six dice). It is used if they are using a skill to perform a task that they are untrained in.
- Proficiency uses a yellow 12-sided die], and presents the character's skill. Every rank of skill (one to five dice) substitutes a proficiency die for an ability die.
- Boost uses light blue 6-sided die, and is used to aid a skill roll due to advantageous factors (like being assisted by an ally).
- Difficulty uses purple 8-sided die], and is used to oppose a skill roll by how difficult the task is (normally rated from one to five dice). They are also used if the task is being opposed by an untrained character and is based on their Attribute level (one to six dice).
- Challenge uses a red 12-sided die, and is used when a skill roll is being opposed by a skilled character with ranks in a skill. Each rank of proficiency (one to five dice) replaces a difficulty die with a challenge die.
- Setback uses a black 6-sided die, and is used to penalize a skill roll due to disadvantageous factors.
- Force uses a white 12-sided die, and is used to determine the number of destiny points that go into the destiny pool at the beginning of play. It is also used for luck rolls and the use of force powers.
- Percentile dice, are used to roll on the critical injury and critical hit charts. They are not included in the narrative dice set.

The facets contain either a blank or one of six results.

- Success and failure are positive and negative results on the succeed / fail axis. If the sum is positive, the action succeeds, but if the sum is neutral or negative, then it fails.
- Advantage and threat are positive and negative results on the lucky / unlucky axis. If the sum is positive, the action has positive side-effects. If the sum is negative, then the action has negative side-effects.
- Triumph is only found on proficiency dice, and is a critical success that counts as a success result and can unlock special abilities or cause critical damage in combat.
- Despair is only found on challenge dice, and is a critical failure that counts as a failure result. It also causes a powerful negative effect.

=== Destiny tokens ===
Destiny tokens are small black and white sided game tokens. They represent the party's pool of destiny points. They are granted based on force dice rolls at the beginning of each session. The player characters' party gets the tokens of one color and the game master gets the remaining tokens of the opposing color. White tokens represent the Light side of the Force, black tokens Dark side. The party's affiliation determines which color they get.

A destiny point can be spent to award a bonus die for a character's action, or inflict a penalty die to the opposition's effort. Destiny points can also be used to change a situation or cancel out or re-roll an unfavorable result. Each time a destiny point is used by the party or the game master, a tokens is flipped and added to the opposite side's pool. The game is intended for a relatively regular flow of destiny points back and forth.

=== Combat rules ===
The first step in combat is to figure out Initiative, by making a cool or vigilance skill check. The results (best to worst) indicate the order in which the characters and their adversaries act.

The combat skills are:

- Brawl, covers unarmed combat.
- Melee, covers armed combat.
  - Lightsaber, covers armed combat with a lightsabers, and includes phase daggers and lightwhips. Anyone can learn to use a lightsaber, but a character has to be a force sensitive in order to wield it effectively.
- Ranged (light) are small ranged weapons that can be carried and fired with one hand.
- Ranged (heavy) are large ranged weapons that need to be carried with two hands.
- Gunnery covers pintle-mounted or turreted ranged weapons, usually mounted on vehicles and starships. It also covers fixed-firing on-board weapon systems like a starfighter's laser cannons, ion cannons, and proton torpedo launchers.

Combat modifiers are calculated using range bands.

==== Non-player characters in combat ====
In combat the player characters have three kinds of adversaries:

- Minions are nameless individuals who provide muscle to flesh out encounters. They have group soak and wound threshold ratings. Every time the damage exceeds the wound threshold, a minion "succumbs" and the group loses a member. If the damage doesn't exceed the threshold, the minion is fine and can continue fighting. If an individual minion takes a critical injury, they are incapacitated; an area-effect attack on a minion group that inflicts a critical injury incapacitates one minion per critical injury scored.
- Rivals are named adversaries that are more dangerous than minions but still inferior to most player characters. They act as minor antagonists and/or lieutenants to major antagonists. They suffer wounds and critical injuries normally, but can die if their wound threshold is exceeded.
- A nemeses are usually more powerful than the character in order for them to be a challenge - not just for the character, but for the whole party. They are treated like player characters when they fight, make skill checks, and take damage. The main thing that separates a Nemesis from a rival is that they are the major antagonist.

== Reception ==
Fantasy Flight initially drew initial criticism for releasing a paid beta version, then a full release, and for the extra expense of the custom dice. Reviews after launch were enthusiastic about the dice, with Game Informer saying "In practice, this system offers tremendous flexibility to allow the players to participate in the storytelling process, rather than just waiting for the GM to respond after a die roll. The players talk together about how to interpret a roll of the dice, and shape the results to make the most exciting story. It also speaks strongly to the cinematic nature of the Star Wars universe; characters in the movies often succeed or fail along with potent side effects." and Penny Arcade saying "This dice system is designed to facilitate awesome storytelling and it worked great!" In 2022, CBR also highlighted the dice system — the article states "the Star Wars Roleplaying Game excels in its theming and incorporates it into every part of its system. The best example of theme influencing the mechanics of SWRPG is the dice pool system. [...] While many TRPGs use their dice as a simple mechanic that adds nothing to storytelling, the Star Wars Roleplaying Game uses themed dice and group interpretation to immerse its players in the story".

Force and Destiny was on Popular Mechanics's 2015 "The Ten Best Tabletop Games of 2015" list — the article states "there have been a lot of Star Wars role playing games over the years, and unfortunately few make the player really feel like a grounded member of the franchise universe. But that's where Star Wars: Force and Destiny shines". Giaco Furino, in a separate review of Force and Destiny for Popular Mechanics, commented that "this is a roleplaying game that commands your attention, and is full of fanservice and nods to the die-hards. [...] Since 2012, Fantasy Flight Games has been on a roll, creating insanely fun RPG's set in the Star Wars universe. [...] And now [...] they're putting out Star Wars: Force and Destiny, where you take on the role of wannabe Jedi and Sith, and head out into the galaxy to use the force for good and evil". Furino highlighted that "this game digs deep into the Star Wars mythos, but it's not so esoteric as to drive away newcomers and casual fans of the franchise. [...] While some RPG's encourage intense number crunching and data management, Force and Destiny is all about story".

The 2015 Strange Assembly review of Star Wars: Force and Destiny states that "of all the Star Wars RPG lines, Force and Destiny is arguably the most ripe for cross-line use. All three lines are, of course, designed to be fully compatible with each other, but [...] it seems less likely to have a whole group of hidden force users than, say, a Rebel cell or a cadre of smugglers". On the mechanics of running a character from one game line in a different themed game, the review states that these characters have "to give up something to join a group of the others [...]. This dichotomy is exemplified by the two line-specific mechanisms of EotE (Obligation) and AoR (Duty) – each is to some extent a group-based mechanic, with the group as a whole getting dragged around. The equivalent from Force and Destiny (Morality), however, is a deeply personal concept to each individual character. Just as a character can easily have both Morality and Duty/Obligation, so too can a force user built from Force and Destiny be dropped into a campaign with few or no other force users, and fit right in (indeed, that’s basically what the Force Sensitive specializations in those game lines were)".

Daniel Foster, in a 2020 review of Star Wars: Edge of the Empire beginner game for FanSided, wrote that "the most challenging thing to me as an experienced role-player was learning the new dice system. [...] My group completed the adventure in the beginner set in about two hours. [...] The game never got bogged down even as we were getting used to interpreting the dice rolls, and the included maps, markers, and stats were easily referenced while adding to the game experience". Foster commented "though the game predates the Disney acquisition, we did not run into any major conflicts with new canon". He also commented that the various Star Wars Roleplaying Game "games are sold separately, but are compatible systems, allowing a good Game Master to move their players through a campaign that could touch on any of those settings".

Richard Jansen-Parkes, in a review of the Dawn of Rebellion (2018) for the UK magazine Tabletop Gaming, stated that the sourcebook is "designed to work with all three of the subtly different rulesets released by the studio" and "aims to set up adventures in the early days of the Rebellion. [...] It's a time of stealth missions and sabotage rather than pitched battles, where the heroes are likely to be desperate renegades rather than superpowered warriors". Jansen-Parkes highlighted that Dawn of Rebellion evokes the film Rogue One and the animated series Star Wars Rebels; it also includes details on running adventures inside the Death Star. Jansen-Parkes commented that "You could potentially argue that the book is a little on the slim side – and when you cut out everything that you could probably piece together with a couple of hours on Wookiepedia it gets slimmer still. That doesn't change the fact that it's still a beautifully put-together volume. If you're looking for a new spin on roleplaying in that galaxy far, far away it's well worth a look".

Cannibal Halfling Gaming, an ENNIE Award nominated website, reviewed both the Rise of the Separatists and the Collapse of the Republic sourcebooks in 2019 — the second review states "if you're coming at this era of Star Wars Roleplaying cold and don't already have Rise of the Separatists, you'll be fine with just Collapse of the Republic so long as you stick to its specific era (later seasons of The Clone Wars, Revenge of the Sith), although you might feel a little squeezed for options without the Padawan, the more run-of-the-mill Clone Soldiers, and so on in certain play styles. If you're not fighting for the Republic, though, or at least not as Jedi and clones, well in that case you'll have an easier time of it. Final word: Rise of the Separatists got my curiosity, Collapse of the Republic got my attention, and together they're giving me ideas. Get one or get both, but if you're interested in playing in the twilight of the Republic, they'll be money well spent".

=== Awards ===
| Year | Award | Category | Product | Result | Ref. |
|---|---|---|---|---|---|
| 2013 | Golden Geek Award | RPG: Game of the Year | Star Wars: Edge of the Empire | Nominated | |
| 2013 | Golden Geek Award | RPG: Best Artwork & Presentation | Star Wars: Edge of the Empire Core Rulebook | Won | |
| 2013 | Golden Geek Award | RPG: Best Supplement | Star Wars: Edge of the Empire Beginner Game | Nominated | |
| 2013 | UK Games Expo Awards | Best Role-playing Game | Star Wars: Edge of the Empire | Won | |
| 2014 | Golden Geek Award | RPG: Game of the Year | Star Wars: Force and Destiny | Nominated | |
| 2014 | Golden Geek Award | RPG: Best Artwork & Presentation | Star Wars: Age of Rebellion Core Rulebook | Nominated | |
| 2015 | Golden Geek Award | RPG: Best Artwork & Presentation | Star Wars: Force and Destiny Beginner Game | Nominated | |
| 2015 | Golden Geek Award | RPG: Best Artwork & Presentation | Star Wars: Force and Destiny Core Rulebook | Runner Up | |
| 2015 | Golden Geek Award | RPG: Best Supplement | Star Wars: Force and Destiny Game Master's Kit | Nominated | |
| 2016 | Origins Award | Best Role-Playing Game | Star Wars: Force and Destiny | Won | |
| 2016 | Origins Award | Fan Favorite Role-Playing Game | Star Wars: Force and Destiny | Won | |
| 2017 | Origins Award | Fan Favorite Role-Playing Game | Star Wars: Edge of the Empire | Won | |

== Official products ==
=== Star Wars Roleplaying Game ===
These items can be used with Edge of the Empire, Age of Rebellion and/or Force and Destiny rules sets.

| Title | Creator(s) | Date | ISBN | Notes |
Boxed sets
| Star Wars: The Force Awakens - Beginner Game | | August 2016 | 9781633442658 | The game is set before Star Wars: The Force Awakens, during the New Republic era. Box set includes the 48-page Star Wars: The Force Awakens basic rule book, a 14-piece Star Wars: Roleplaying Game Dice set, and a set of 8 Destiny Tokens. Also includes the 32-page adventure module book Discovery on Jakku and the following play aids: four eight-page pre-generated player character booklets, a double-sided map (obverse (2 maps): hangar bay of the Silencer / wreck of the Starlight Wanderer; reverse (1 map): Galactic Map with major trade routes and a sidebar with short entries on the planets Jakku, Takodana, and D'Quar and the First Order's Starkiller Base), and 49 character and vehicle tokens. The Beginner Game rule book is limited and lacks the full gameplay and character generation and development rules from the other three Core Books. |
Adventures
| Star Wars: The Force Awakens - A Call for Heroes | Jordan Goldfarb, Sam Stewart | August 18, 2016 | | A sequel to Discovery on Jakku from the Beginner Game. It is a 30-page booklet available as a downloadable PDF file. |
Sourcebooks
| Dawn of Rebellion | Tim Huckelbery, John Dunn, Sterling Hershey, Jonathan Julius, Keith Ryan Kappel, Jason Marker, Tom Sorenson, James M. Spahn | February 22, 2018 | 9781633443174 | Era sourcebook: set during the events of the Rogue One: A Star Wars Story movie and the Star Wars Rebels (TV 2014–2018) series, between the rise of the Empire and the beginning of the Rebellion. |
| Allies and Adversaries | Molly Glover, Leah Hawthorne, Sterling Hershey, Tim Huckelbery, Keith Kappel, Phil Maiewski | April 18, 2019 | 9781633443501 | NPC sourcebook: profiles and stats for over 130 NPCs. Details Rebels, Imperials, and assorted rogues, scum and villains. |
| Rise of the Separatists | Tim Cox, John Dunn, Jordan Goldfarb, Sterling Hershey, Keith Kappel, Monte Lin, Jason Marker | May 9, 2019 | 9781633443433 | Era sourcebook: set during the Prequel movies (Star Wars: Episodes I, II & III) and the Star Wars: Clone Wars TV series (Star Wars: The Clone Wars (TV 2003–2005) & Star Wars: The Clone Wars (TV 2008–2013)) at the beginning of the Clone Wars era. |
| Collapse of the Republic | Tim Cox, John Dunn, Lisa Farrell, Sterling Hershey, Keith Kappel, Monte Lin, Jason Marker | June 28, 2019 | 9781633443433 | Era sourcebook: set during the events of Star Wars: Revenge of the Sith. Details the end of the Clone Wars, the decline of the Old Republic, the purge of the Jedi Order, and the rise of the Sith. Introduces new character Races, Careers, and Specialization Trees and details important NPCs of the period. |
| Gadgets and Gear | Alexis Dykema, Keith Kappel, Phil Maiewski | September 13, 2019 | 9781633443280 | Weapons and equipment sourcebook: collects most of the weapons and gear from the Edge of the Empire, Age of Rebellion, and Force and Destiny lines, plus new content. |
| Starships and Speeders | Tim Cox, Tim Huckelbery, Christopher Hunt, Phil Maiewski, Jason Marker, Kevin Thomas Schluter, Darryl Isaacs | February 28, 2020 | 9781633443679 | Ships and vehicles sourcebook: collects most of the ships and vehicles from Edge of the Empire, Age of Rebellion, and Force and Destiny lines, plus new content. |

=== Star Wars: Edge of the Empire ===
| Title | Creator(s) | Date | ISBN | Notes |
Rulebooks / basic sets
| Star Wars: Edge of the Empire Beta playtest | John Dunn, Sterling Hershey, Tim Huckelbery | August 17, 2012 | 9781616615819 | Softcover rulebook contains the beginning adventure module Crates of Krayts. Includes five full-color character sheets and a sheet of Roleplaying Dice conversion stickers. |
| Star Wars: Edge of the Empire Beginner Game | Sterling Hershey | December 17, 2012 | 9781616615932 | Box set includes the 48-page Star Wars: Edge of the Empire basic rule book, a 14-piece Star Wars: Edge of the Empire Dice set, and a set of 8 Destiny Tokens. Also includes the 32-page adventure module book Escape from Mos Shuuta and the following play aids: four eight-page pre-generated player character booklets, a double-sided map, 35 character tokens, and 5 vehicle tokens. The Beginner Game basic rule book is limited and lacks the full gameplay and character generation and development rules from the Core Book. |
| Star Wars: Edge of the Empire Core Rulebook | John Dunn, Sterling Hershey, Tim Huckelbery | July 5, 2013 | 9781616616571 | Hardcover rulebook which includes the Trouble Brewing adventure module. |
| Star Wars: Edge of the Empire Game Master's Kit | Sterling Hershey | July 5, 2013 | 9781616616588 | Includes the 4-panel gamemaster's screen, a 32-page booklet containing the adventure module Debts to Pay and an article discussing hints on how best to use the Nemesis Character system for Star Wars campaigns. |
Adventure modules
| The Long Arm of the Hutt | Dave Allen, Daniel Lovat Clark | December 14, 2012 | —N/a | A sequel to Escape from Mos Shuuta from the Beginner Game released as a free PDF digital download. |
| Under a Black Sun | Jeff Hall | June 15, 2013 | —N/a | A booklet with Dice Conversion tables, Fast-Play Rules for Star Wars: Edge of the Empire, 4 pre-generated characters, and an adventure set on Corellia involving the Black Sun pirate syndicate. Originally given away at retailers on Free RPG Day, it is now available as a free digital download titled Shadows of a Black Sun. |
| Beyond the Rim | Sterling Hershey | September 6, 2013 | 9781616616892 | The Separatist treasure ship Sa Nalaor was believed lost, but speculation and tantalizing rumors of its location keep circulating in every dive and hideout in the Galaxy. The characters are trying to beat other crews of treasure-seekers (and perhaps, each other) to its resting place. |
| The Jewel of Yavin | Dave Allen, Shawn Carman, Daniel Lovat Clark, Jordan Goldfarb | March 31, 2014 | 9781616616809 | A heist in which the characters strive to acquire a priceless corusca gem. |
| Mask of the Pirate Queen | Tim Huckelbery | November 19, 2015 | 9781633441897 | The characters are looking to collect the bounty on the infamous Pirate Queen of Saleucami. |
Rules Supplements
| Enter the Unknown | Sterling Hershey | December 6, 2013 | 9781616616830 | Explorer career book: adds the Archeologist, Big Game Hunter and Driver Specializations. |
| Dangerous Covenants | David Kegg, Mark Molnar | February 28, 2014 | 9781616616878 | Hired Gun career book: adds the Demolitionist, Enforcer, and Heavy Specializations. |
| Far Horizons | Sam Stewart | August 14, 2014 | 9781616616915 | Colonist career book: adds the Entrepreneur, Marshall, and Performer Specializations. |
| Fly Casual | Max Brooke, Katrina Ostrander, Ryan K. Brooks, Tim Cox, Daniel Lovat Clark, John Crowdis, Lisa Farrell, Gregory Koteles | February 23, 2015 | 9781633440685 | Smuggler career book: adds the Charmer, Gambler, and Gunslinger Specializations. |
| Special Modifications | | March 24, 2016 | 9781633442498 | Technician career book: adds the Cyber Tech, Droid Tech, and Modder Specializations. |
| No Disintegrations | | February 2, 2017 | 9781633443112 | Bounty Hunter career book: adds the Martial Artist, Operator and Skip Tracer Specializations. |
Sourcebooks
| Suns of Fortune | | January 24, 2014 | 9781616616854 | Corellian Sector sourcebook |
| Lords of Nal Hutta | Max Brooke, Sterling Hershey, Ryan K. Brooks | February 5, 2015 | 9781616616939 | Hutt Space sourcebook for Game Masters |

=== Star Wars: Age of Rebellion ===
| Title | Creator(s) | Date | ISBN | Notes |
Rulebooks / basic sets
| Star Wars: Age of Rebellion Beta | John Dunn, Sterling Hershey, Tim Huckelbery | September 27, 2013 | 9781616617486 | Softcover sourcebook which contains the adventure Operation: Shell Game, one full-color character sheet and six pre-generated illustrated character sheets. |
| Star Wars: Age of Rebellion Beginner Game | Max Brooke, Daniel Clark, Katrina Ostrander, Jay Little, Andrew Fischer | April 25, 2014 | 9781616618780 | Box set includes the basic 48-page Star Wars: Age of Rebellion rule book, four eight-page pre-generated illustrated player character booklets, a set of 14 Star Wars Roleplaying Dice, and a set of 8 Destiny Tokens. Also includes the 32-page adventure module book Takeover at Whisper Base and the following play aids: a double-sided map, 33 character tokens and 7 vehicle tokens. The Beginner Game is limited and lacks the full gameplay and character generation and development rules from the Core Book. |
| Star Wars: Age of Rebellion Core Rulebook | Andrew Fischer, Gary Astleford, John Dunn, Sterling Hershey, Tim Huckelbery, Jason Marker | July 3, 2014 | 9781616617806 | Hardcover sourcebook for players and Game Masters. |
| Star Wars: Age of Rebellion Game Master's Kit | | July 3, 2014 | 9781616617813 | Includes the 4-panel gamemaster's screen and a 32-page booklet containing the adventure Dead in the Water. Includes expanded rules for land and space combat. |
Adventure modules
| Rescue at Glare Peak (Rebellion Day Supplemental Adventure) | Sterling Hershey, Dan Clark | September 13, 2014 | —N/a | Box Set: contains a 48-page Adventure / Star Wars - Age of Rebellion Fast-Play Rules booklet, three sets of play aids (each containing a mapsheet with three maps and 4 pre-generated character sheets) to run three one-shot sessions, a set of 14 Star Wars Roleplaying Dice and 8 Destiny Tokens, and a promotional Rebellion Day poster. Only available to participating retailers who applied to get them before August 6, 2014. The event was held worldwide on Rebellion Day 2014. |
| Onslaught at Arda I | Katrina Ostrander, Jeff Hall | August 14, 2014 | 9781616619121 | A military campaign in which the characters are operating out of a secret Rebel base. Includes mass combat rules and new vehicle stats. |
| Friends Like These | Keith Ryan Kappel, Ryan K. Brooks | December 8, 2016 | 9781633442993 | The characters have to protect the planet Xorrrn and defend the secret Rebel shipyards there. Includes rules for creating and playing Mandalorian characters. |
Rules Supplements
| Stay on Target | Andrew Fischer, John Crowdis, Sterling Hershey, Keith Kappel, Jason Marker | December 23, 2014 | 9781633440197 | Ace career book: adds the Beast Rider, Hotshot, and Rigger Specializations. |
| Desperate Allies | Max Brooke, John Dunn | June 18, 2015 | 9781633441262 | Diplomat career book: adds the Advocate, Analyst and Propagandist Specializations. |
| Lead by Example | John Dunn | February 4, 2016 | 9781633442245 | Commander career book: adds the Figurehead, Instructor and Strategist Specializations. |
| Forged in Battle | Ryan K. Brooks, John Dunn, Keith Kappel | August 18, 2016 | 9781633442894 | Soldier career book: adds the Heavy, Trailblazer, and Vanguard Specializations. |
| Fully Operational | Tim Huckelbery | March 29, 2018 | 9781633443143 | Engineer career book: adds the Droid Specialist, Sapper, and Shipwright Specializations. |
| Cyphers and Masks | Tim Huckelbery | August 16, 2018 | 9781633443181 | Spy career book: adds the Courier, Interrogator and Sleeper Agent Specializations. |
Sourcebooks
| Strongholds of Resistance | Gary Astleford, Ryan K. Brooks, Sterling Hershey, Keith Ryan Kappel, Jason Marker | November 12, 2015 | 9781633441385 | Alliance Worlds sourcebook for Game Masters |

=== Star Wars: Force and Destiny ===
| Title | Creator(s) | Date | ISBN | Notes |
Rulebooks / basic sets
| Star Wars: Force and Destiny Beta | John Dunn | September 10, 2014 | 9781616619916 | Contains the introductory adventure Lost Knowledge and comes with one blank full-color character sheet and six pre-generated illustrated character sheets. |
| Star Wars: Force and Destiny Beginner Game | | June 18, 2015 | 9781633441088 | Boxed set: includes a 48-page Beginner's Game basic rule book, 4 pre-generated character folios, 2 downloadable character folio PDF files, a set of 14 Star Wars Roleplay Dice and 8 Destiny Tokens. Also includes the 32-page adventure module book Mountaintop Rescue and the following play aids: a double-sided map sheet (obverse (3 maps): The Valley, The Path to the Ruin, & The Ruin; reverse: The Temple), and 55 character and monster tokens. The Beginner Game is limited and lacks the full gameplay and character generation and development rules from the Core Book. |
| Star Wars: Force and Destiny Core Rulebook | Jay Little, Sam Stewart, Max Brooke, Daniel Clark, John Dunn, Keith Kappel, Corey Konieczka, Monte Lin, Jason Marker, Jason Mical, Katrina Ostrander, Christopher Rowe, Andrew Fischer | July 30, 2015 | 9781633441224 | Contains the introductory adventure Lessons from the Past. |
| Force and Destiny Game Master's Kit | | July 30, 2015 | 9781633441255 | Includes the gamemaster's screen and a 32-page booklet containing the adventure module Hidden Depths. Includes expanded rules for experienced Knight-level play, allowing you to start players off with developed Talents and Force powers. |
Adventure modules
| Lure of the Lost | Jordan Goldfarb, Daniel Lovat Clark, Chris Gerber | June 18, 2015 | —N/a | Star Wars: Force and Destiny Beginner Game bonus adventure available as a downloadable PDF file |
| Chronicles of the Gatekeeper | | November 5, 2015 | 9781633441804 | A holocron of a lost Jedi Knight surfaces which offers a journey for Force-sensitives seeking knowledge; those who follow it can gain power but risk corruption. |
| Ghosts of Dathomir | Tim Huckelbery, Jonathan Julius | October 19, 2017 | 9781633443129 | An artifact surfaces leading to a journey in the Outer Rim which includes Force visions and the discover of galactic secrets. |
Supplements
| Keeping the Peace | | December 17, 2015 | 9781633442238 | Guardian career book: adds the Armorer, Warden, and Warleader specializations. |
| Savage Spirits | Tim Huckelbery | June 2, 2016 | 9781633442443 | Seeker career book: adds the Executioner, Hermit, and Navigator specializations. |
| Endless Vigil | Tim Huckelbery, James M. Spahn | October 31, 2016 | 9781633442870 | Sentinel career book: adds the Investigator, Racer, and Sentry specializations. |
| Disciples of Harmony | John Dunn, James M. Spahn | June 1, 2017 | 9781633443150 | Consular career book: adds the Arbiter, Ascetic, and Teacher specializations. |
| Unlimited Power | | May 31, 2018 | 9781633443211 | Mystic career book: adds the Alchemist, Magus, and Prophet specializations. |
| Knights of Fate | | June 21, 2018 | 9781633443266 | Warrior career book: adds the Colossus, Juyo Berzerker, and Steel Hand Adept specializations. |
Sourcebooks
| Nexus of Power | Sam Stewart, Sterling Hershey, Keith Kappel, Jason Marker, Jason Mical, Christopher Rowe | March 17, 2016 | 9781633442481 | Worlds Strong in the Force sourcebook |

== See also ==
- List of Star Wars Roleplaying Game books
- Star Wars: The Roleplaying Game (West End Games) (Licensed from 1987 to 1999)
  - D6 system - D6 Space (2004-2010): West End Games' generic set of Space Opera / Cyberpunk rules derived from the Star Wars RPG version of the D6 system.
- Star Wars Roleplaying Game (Wizards of the Coast) (Licensed from 2000 to 2010): WotC's d20 version of Star Wars, often dubbed "D20 version 3.75" because elements from it were incorporated into Dungeons & Dragons 4th Edition.
- Genesys (2017-2020): Fantasy Flight Games' generic set of rules based on the Star Wars RPG. It uses similar dice, but changed the result symbols.
