= Alien Anthology =

Role-playing game supplement

Alien Anthology is a 2001 role-playing game supplement published by Wizards of the Coast for the Star Wars Roleplaying Game.

== Contents ==
Alien Anthology is a supplement in which a guide covers the countless alien species across the galaxy, offering essential knowledge for soldiers, smugglers, and adventurers encountering strange worlds and their dangerous fauna.

== Reviews ==
- Pyramid
- Coleção Dragão Brasil
