= Twilight Imperium: The Role-Playing Game =

Tabletop space opera role-playing game

Twilight Imperium: The Role-Playing Game is a role-playing game published by Fantasy Flight Games in 1999.

== Description ==
Twilight Imperium: The Role-Playing Game was based on the first board game published by Fantasy Flight Games, Twilight Imperium.

== Publication history ==
Twilight Imperium: The Role-Playing Game was published by Fantasy Flight Games in 1999, and the company allowed the line to trail off in 1999–2001 as it was planning new game lines at that time.

== Reception ==
Shannon Appelcline commented on the fate of this game: "Unfortunately, the ubiquitous element that made the board game fun — its mixture of elements reminiscent of Dune, Star Wars, Star Trek, and many other well-known settings — couldn't support the increased scrutiny required for a roleplaying setting, and a simplistic rules system wasn't enough to save it. After the Mecatol Rex (2000) supplement, the game was doomed to fade away."
