= Home Media Magazine =

Entertainment publication

- Frequency: Monthly
- Founded: July 1979
- Company: Questex Media Group
- Country: United States
- Based in: Santa Ana, California
- Language: English

Home Media Magazine was a trade publication that covered various aspects of the home entertainment industry, most notably home video distribution via VHS, DVD, Blu-ray, and digital copy. The magazine also covered news relating to consumer electronics, video games, home video distributors and various forms of digital distribution of movie and TV content.

== History and profile ==
The magazine was founded in 1979 and was known as Video Store Magazine until January 2005, when it became Home Media Retailing. The magazine dropped "Retailing" to further its consumer focus in early 2007. In 2014, the magazine's print edition was reduced to biweekly and in 2015, to monthly; at the same time, the magazine expanded its web presence through a daily e-newsletter and frequent "breaking news" alerts. HM also published frequent special issues, such as special reports on 4K Ultra HD, Vidity, and UltraViolet; rankings of the top women in home entertainment, key digital drivers, and leading disruptors; and, in 2011, a salute to executives in home entertainment under the age of 40.

The magazine was based in Santa Ana, California, and was a subsidiary of the Questex Media Group.

In July 2006, HM launched a consumer magazine called Agent DVD, a semi-regular periodical focusing on home entertainment news. The first issue debuted at the 2006 San Diego Comic-Con and focused on titles and news that would appeal to convention-goers. The consumer magazine was later rebranded as Home Media Insider and offered only in digital form. Additionally, Home Media Magazine presented annual awards covering the best DVD and Blu-ray products. Questex ceased production of Home Media Magazine after the December 2017 issue.

== Media Play News ==
In January 2018, the core team responsible for producing the Home Media Magazine print and online properties returned with an independent operation named Media Play News that offers an expanded home entertainment focus from its predecessor, covering not just Blu-ray Disc and DVD but also transactional video-on-demand (both streaming and purchase) as well as subscription streaming.

Thomas K. Arnold is the publisher and editorial director of Media Play News, while Stephanie Prange is the editor-in-chief.

The new publication publishes a monthly magazine in print and digital versions and maintains a website, a daily newsletter, reviews, and breaking news alerts.

Media Play News acts both as a curator and an aggregator of content for the home entertainment industry, as it distributes its various forms of content using multiple digital and print channels. Currently, Media Plays News is used and cited by retailers, media outlets, (Note: Both in the United States and overseas, including Newstex Trade & Industry Blogs, Indian entertainment outlet AnimationXpress) technology reporters, and consumers in the home entertainment industry.

Media Play News often uses major conventions, festivals, and other industry events (Note: e.g., CES Las Vegas and the American Film Market (AFM) as an additional channel to distribute its print publication) as an additional channel to distribute its print publication.

Since 2018, Media Play News has published a curated list of the top forty influential business executives in the home entertainment industry. The list is titled "40 Under 40 in Home Entertainment".

Media Plays News produces an annual "Home Entertainment Media Play Awards" contest. The awards are all-embracing to the home entertainment industry, covering dozens of categories. (Note: Categories included: Blu-ray Disc of the Year, Best TV Documentary, Best Complete TV Series Set, Best Current TV Series on Disc, Best AV Quality/Blu-ray Movie, Best Indie/Small-Budget Film, Best Foreign Film on Disc, Best Documentary Movie, Best Movie Collection/Boxed Set, Best Catalog Title, Best Direct-to-Video/Limited Release, Best Theatrical Disc, Fan-Favorite Title of the Year)
