= Star Wars Roleplaying Game (Wizards of the Coast) =

Tabletop role-playing game

Star Wars
Roleplaying Game
- Star Wars Roleplaying Game; Revised Core Rulebook
- Designers: Bill Slavicsek, Andy Collins, JD Wiker
- Publishers: Wizards of the Coast
- Publication: 2000; 2002 (Revised edition); 2007 (Saga Edition)
- Genres: Science fiction (Space opera)
- Systems: d20 System

The Star Wars Roleplaying Game is a d20 System roleplaying game set in the Star Wars universe. The game was written by Bill Slavicsek, Andy Collins and J. D. Wiker and published by Wizards of the Coast in late 2000 and revised in 2002. In 2007, Wizards released the Saga Edition of the game, which made major changes in an effort to streamline the rules system.

The game covers three major eras coinciding with major events in the Star Wars universe, namely the Rise of the Empire, the Galactic Civil War, and the time of the New Jedi Order.

An earlier but unrelated Star Wars role-playing game was published by West End Games between 1987 and 1999. Bill Slavicsek was one of the designers of that former game as well.

This game from Wizards of the Coast is currently out of print. The current official Star Wars role-playing game is the game of same title published by Fantasy Flight Games.

== Original and revised editions ==
The original Star Wars: The Roleplaying Game was originally published by West End Games as a d6 product, enjoying many years of play before WEG went bankrupt.

The d20 rebooted Star Wars Roleplaying Game was originally published in November 2000. It included statistics for many of the major characters of the movie Star Wars Episode I: The Phantom Menace. The later Revised game included material from Star Wars: Episode II – Attack of the Clones and changed various feats and classes.

The Star Wars Roleplaying Game uses a Vitality/Wound point system instead of standard hit points, dividing damage into superficial harm (Vitality) and serious injury (Wounds). A character gains Vitality points just like hit points in other d20 games, and rolls for them each level and adds their Constitution bonus. A character's Wound points are equal to their Constitution score.

Most game mechanics are familiar to players of Dungeons & Dragons and other d20-based games. Characters have six Ability Scores (i.e., the standard Strength, Dexterity, Constitution, Intelligence, Wisdom and Charisma), a class and level, feats, and skills. Most actions are resolved by rolling a twenty-sided die and adding a modifier; if the result equals or exceeds the difficulty, the check succeeds.

=== Species and classes ===
As with most d20 System games, Star Wars offers playable races (called species) and classes to the Player Characters (PCs).

The species of Star Wars d20 that are included with the Revised Core Rulebook are: Humans, Bothans, Cereans, Duros, Ewoks, Gungans, Ithorians, Kel Dor, Mon Calamari, Quarren, Rodians, Sullustans, Trandoshans, Twi'leks, Wookiees, and Zabrak and the unusual option for d20 games, Droid (this is unusual because it allows you to create your own race to an extent, and also you are ruled - technically mastered - by another player).

The character classes are Fringer, Noble, Scoundrel, Soldier, Force Adept, Jedi Guardian, Jedi Consular, Scout, and Tech Specialist (added with the Revised Edition). Prestige classes allow advanced characters who wish to specialize in certain suites of abilities to join a class devoted to them. For example, Jedi with special talents at helping others can choose to specialize as a Jedi Healer, while a blaster-wielding mercenary might earn a reputation as a Bounty Hunter. The core rulebook includes the Jedi Master, Jedi Ace, Crime lord, Elite Trooper, Starship Ace, Officer, Darkside Marauder, and Darkside Devotee. Supplements to the core rulebook introduce many more prestige classes.

Saga edition changed things around and made Force Adept a prestige class.

=== Original and revised editions releases ===
The following books are available for the original edition.

Title	Date	Pages	ISBN
Star Wars: Roleplaying Game Core Rulebook	November 2000	288	ISBN 978-0-7869-1793-8
Character Record Sheets	November 2000	32	ISBN 978-0-7869-1795-2
Invasion of Theed	November 2000	96	ISBN 978-0-7869-1792-1
Secrets of Naboo	December 2000	96	ISBN 978-0-7869-1794-5
Gamemaster Screen	February 2001	8	ISBN 978-0-7869-1833-1
Living Force Campaign Guide	March 2001	64	ISBN 978-0-7869-1963-5
Rebellion Era Sourcebook	May 2001	160	ISBN 978-0-7869-1837-9
Secrets of Tatooine	May 2001	96	ISBN 978-0-7869-1839-3
The Dark Side Sourcebook	August 2001	160	ISBN 978-0-7869-1849-2
Alien Anthology	October 2001	128	ISBN 978-0-7869-2663-3
Starships of the Galaxy	December 2001	96	ISBN 978-0-7869-1859-1
The New Jedi Order Sourcebook	February 2002	160	ISBN 978-0-7869-2777-7
Tempest Feud	March 2002	128	ISBN 978-0-7869-2778-4

The following books are available for the revised edition.

Title	Date	Pages	ISBN
Star Wars: Roleplaying Game Revised Core Rulebook	May 2002	384	ISBN 978-0-7869-2876-7
Power of the Jedi Sourcebook	August 2002	160	ISBN 978-0-7869-2781-4
Arms and Equipment Guide	October 2002	96	ISBN 978-0-7869-2782-1
Coruscant and the Core Worlds	January 2003	160	ISBN 978-0-7869-2879-8
Ultimate Alien Anthology	April 2003	224	ISBN 978-0-7869-2888-0
Hero's Guide	June 2003	160	ISBN 978-0-7869-2883-5
Galactic Campaign Guide	August 2003	160	ISBN 978-0-7869-2892-7
Geonosis and the Outer Rim Worlds	March 2004	160	ISBN 978-0-7869-3133-0
Ultimate Adversaries	July 2004	160	ISBN 978-0-7869-3054-8

== Saga Edition ==
Star Wars: Roleplaying Game - Saga Edition Core Rulebook
- Star Wars: Roleplaying Game - Saga Edition Core Rulebook
- Designers: Christopher Perkins, Owen K.C. Stephens, Rodney Thompson
- Publishers: Wizards of the Coast
- Publication: June 5, 2007
- Genres: Science fiction (Space opera)
- Systems: d20 System

On June 5, 2007, Wizards released Star Wars: Roleplaying Game - Saga Edition Core Rulebook. The game was streamlined to be easier to play and a greater emphasis was placed on miniatures. Some of the major changes include:

- Standard hit points have replaced the former Wounds/Vitality system. Each character begins first level with three times their maximum hit die in hit points based on their class which is modified by the character's Constitution bonus. Jedi and Soldiers for instance, have a hit die of d10, and begin 1st level with 30 hit points + Con bonus. Characters then roll a hit die for additional hit points as they progress in level. Characters also have a Condition Track which measures how much they are currently impaired. If Damage from a single attack exceeds the damage threshold, the PC is moved down the condition track. Each level of the track enforces progressively worse penalties until the PC is knocked out. Further damage can kill the character.
- The number of character classes have been reduced to five — Jedi, Noble, Scoundrel, Scout and Soldier. Each class progresses along "character trees" similar to the d20 Modern system where characters are built with talents and feats. Jedi for instance, can follow talent paths such as Jedi Guardian, Jedi Consular, plus the new Jedi Sentinel and Lightsaber Combat talent trees. This allows for greater customization and more variety amongst characters of the same class. Prestige Classes are still available, but they each also have one or more talent trees.
- Saving Throws have been changed to a series of "Defenses". Virtually all attacks and offensive powers now require a roll against one of three defenses — Reflex Defense, Fortitude Defense, or Will Defense. These Defenses are analogous to both Saving Throws and Armor Class (or Defense as in the previous system) in other d20 games.
- Skill points have been eliminated. Characters have a number of "trained" skills they can pick based on their class and Intelligence bonus. When a character makes a skill check, they roll a d20 and add half their character level + any other bonuses. If they roll for a trained skill they get a +5 bonus to the die roll, and certain applications of some skills cannot be attempted unless trained in the skill. Skills themselves have been simplified and integrated, with such skills as Deception covering the former skills of Bluff, Disguise, and Forgery. The Mechanics skill now encompasses Repair, Disable Device, and Demolitions (as well as crafting devices in the expansion books). Likewise, the new Perception skill combines the Spot, Search, Sense Motive, and Listen skills.
- Force sensitive characters now have a single "Use the Force" skill, which allows them to do a number of things such as moving small objects and searching their feelings. Force Powers are special abilities such as Force Choke or Move Object that form a "suite" of powers, similar to a hand of cards, which are used up, and recharge between encounters; all Force Powers involve a "Use the Force" skill check, and a greater margin of success on the check will produce a stronger effect. Force users can also select Talents related to the Force, and prestige classes grant Force Techniques and Force Secrets which further improve their ability to use the Force.
- The game includes an optional Destiny system. Characters receive "Destiny Points" which are more powerful than Force Points. They allow such things as scoring an automatic critical hit without rolling, gaining 3 Force Points, or automatically succeeding at a virtually impossible task. Destiny Points are used to help characters with a predetermined fate (usually determined during character creation) eventually fulfill their specific overarching goal.
- The character class Attack Bonus progressions no longer allow for multiple attacks during a full-round action. Instead, a character wielding a single weapon must pick the new "Double Attack" feat (for one extra attack) and "Triple Attack" feat (for two extra attacks), but both incurring significant attack roll penalties uniformly to all attacks that turn. Multiple attacks are, in general, less common, streamlining and speeding up combat turns.
- Rules and stats for NPCs have been refined. There is only one non-heroic class for NPC characters. They do not get heroic Defense bonuses, their Hit Points are limited to 1d4 + Con bonus per level (and they do not receive triple maximum starting hit points at first level), they receive less ability score increases for every four levels they have, and they get only the feats granted by gaining levels; non-heroic characters do not gain Talents. Non-sentient creatures in the game use the "Beast" class and gain 1d8 + Con hit points per level.
- Many minor bonuses have been eliminated. Alien races and classes now rarely grant bonuses to skill checks; instead they often allow a reroll of the check under particular circumstances.

=== Saga Releases ===
The following books were released:

Title	Date	Pages	ISBN
Star Wars: Roleplaying Game - Saga Edition Core Rulebook	June 2007	288	ISBN 978-0-7869-4356-2
Starships of the Galaxy (Saga Edition)	December 2007	160	ISBN 978-0-7869-4823-9
Galaxy Tiles	Jan 2008		ISBN 978-0-7869-4744-7
Threats of the Galaxy	May 2008	160	ISBN 978-0-7869-4781-2
Star Wars Gamemaster Screen	June 2008		ISBN 978-0-7869-4936-6
Knights of the Old Republic Campaign Guide	August 2008	224	ISBN 978-0-7869-4923-6
The Force Unleashed Campaign Guide	September 2008	224	ISBN 978-0-7869-4743-0
Scum and Villainy	November 2008	244	ISBN 978-0-7869-5035-5
The Clone Wars Campaign Guide	January 2009	224	ISBN 978-0-7869-4999-1
Legacy Era Campaign Guide	March 2009	224	ISBN 978-0-7869-5051-5
Jedi Academy Training Manual	May 2009	160	ISBN 978-0-7869-5183-3
Rebellion Era Campaign Guide	July 2009	224	ISBN 978-0-7869-4983-0
Galaxy at War	September 2009	224	ISBN 978-0-7869-5221-2
Scavenger's Guide to Droids	November 2009	160	ISBN 978-0-7869-5230-4
Galaxy of Intrigue	January 2010	224	ISBN 978-0-7869-5400-1
The Unknown Regions	April 2010	224	ISBN 978-0-7869-5399-8

The Core Rulebook exists as an original and as a revised printing.

On January 28, 2010, Wizards of the Coast announced on their website that they would not be renewing their license to produce Star Wars products for their roleplaying and miniature gaming lines. Their license ended in May 2010.

== Reception ==
Star Wars Roleplaying Game Saga Edition won the Gold ENnie Awards for Best Game, Best d20/OGL Product, and Best Rules, and the Silver award for Product of the Year.

== Reviews ==
- Pyramid
- Pyramid - Saga Edition
- Backstab #26
- Syfy, no. 185
- Coleção Dragão Brasil
