= The Way of Shinsei =

2000 Fantasy role-playing game supplement

- Cover art by Cris Dornaus
- Author: Wolfgang Baur; Shawn Carman; Kenyon Daniels; Craig Folsom; Ross A. Isaacs; Jeanne Kalvar; Patrick Kapera; Seth Mason; Ramon Pena; John R. Phythyon, Jr.; Rick Raven; Kevin Sanborn; Ree Soesbee; John Wick; Rich Wulf
- Illustrator: Cris Dornaus; Mark Evans; Carl Frank; Zach Howard; Garry W. McKee; Eric Polak; Mike Seller
- Series: Way of the Clans
- Genre: Feudal Japan fantasy
- Publisher: Alderac Entertainment Group
- Publication date: 2000; 26 years ago
- Preceded by: The Way of the Wolf

The Way of Shinsei, subtitled "Way of the Clans: Book 11", is a supplement published by the Alderac Entertainment Group (AEG) in 2000 for the fantasy role-playing game Legend of the Five Rings Roleplaying Game. It is the eleventh and final book in a series describing the clans of Rokugan.

== Contents ==
This supplement describes the Brotherhood of Shinsei, a powerful order of monks. The book begins with short story followed by sections on the history of the Brotherhood and its founder Shinsei; character creation; new skills, advantages and disadvantages; magic-like abilities; notable personalities; and character archetypes.

A two-page spread provides information about card decks for the Legend of the Five Rings collectible card game.

Appendices contain a short scenario, "The Fall of Shihoden Temple", an essay on the role of monks in society, and information on temples in Rokugan.

The French edition also includes another scenario titled "Le Village des Sans-repos" ("The Village of the Restless").

== Publication history ==
The land of Rokugan, a fictional setting based on feudal Japan, was originally published as Legend of the Five Rings by AEG and ISOMEDIA in 1995. Two years later, AEG released Legend of the Five Rings Roleplaying Game, which used the Rokugan setting. Shortly after its release, AEG published The Way of the Dragon, which detailed one of the major clans in Rokugan. Over the next three years, AEG released a series of eleven Way of the Clan books that covered the other clans. The eleventh and final book to be released was The Way of Shinsei, a 112-page softcover book published in 2000 that was designed by Wolfgang Baur, Shawn Carman, Kenyon Daniels, Craig Folsom, Ross A. Isaacs, Jeanne Kalvar, Patrick Kapera, Seth Mason, Ramon Pena, John R. Phythyon, Jr., Rick Raven, Kevin Sanborn, Ree Soesbee, John Wick, and Rich Wulf, with cover art by Cris Dornaus, and interior illustrations by Cris Dornaus, Mark Evans, Carl Frank, Zach Howard, Garry W. McKee, Eric Polak, and Mike Sellers.

In 2000, Siroz Publications released a French translation titled "La Voie de Shinsei", which added a short scenario.

== Reception ==
In Issue 24 of the French games magazine Backstab, Geoffrey Picard commented, "This supplement is of great importance because, like The Way of the Wolf, it has the potential to radically change the style of your campaigns ... it is now possible to create groups completely free from the control of the major clans. This primarily allows for gamemasters to design games in the purest style of chambara adventure films, whose protagonists are much more often wandering monks or impoverished ronin than noble sons and daughters of high imperial families."

Three issues later, Michaël Croitorui reviewed the French edition and commented, "La Voie de Shinsei clarifies all areas [of being a monk]: history, daily life, hierarchy, the main temples, personalities, etc. The French version completes this overview with a skillfully crafted scenario." Croitorui concluded by giving this scenario a rating of 4 out of 5, saying, "In short, a quality supplement that offers players a new alternative: that of playing a character freed from the grip of the clans.
