= The Way of the Crane =

Fantasy role-playing game supplement

- Cover art by Brian Snoddy
- Author: Andrew P. Morris; Matt Richardson; Steve Ruetledge; Ree Soesbee; Bryan Steele; Rob Vaux; John Wick
- Illustrator: Audrey Corman; Liz Danforth; Cris Dornaus; Jason Felix; Carl Frank; Scott James; Scott Johnson; K.C. Lancaster; Bradley K. McDevitt; Ramón K. Pérez; Brian Snoddy
- Series: Way of the Clans
- Genre: Feudal Japan fantasy
- Publisher: Alderac Entertainment Group
- Publication date: 1999; 27 years ago
- Preceded by: The Way of the Crab
- Followed by: The Way of the Scorpion

The Way of the Crane, subtitled "Way of the Clans: Book 4", is a supplement published by the Alderac Entertainment Group (AEG) in 1999 for the fantasy role-playing game Legend of the Five Rings Roleplaying Game. It is the fourth in a series of eleven books describing the clans of Rokugan.

== Contents ==
The Way of the Crane describes in detail the Crane Clan, the most refined clan that is known for its courtiers at the imperial court who sit at the right hand of the Emperor. The book begins with a short story. There are sections describing the history of the clan; its social and political structure; the main families; and profiles of schools only briefly mentioned in the core rulebook. Another chapter introduces new skills, and new advantages and disadvantages — some of which are exclusive to the Crane Clan. Some notable people of the clan are described in detail.

A two-page spread is dedicated to Crane decks for the Legend of Five Rings collectible card game.

The appendices cover the clan's territories, rules for the Crane martial art Mizu-do, and a map of the Doji Citadel.

The French edition also includes a scenario called "Le masque de la vengeance" ("The Mask of Vengeance").

== Publication history ==
The land of Rokugan, a fictional setting based on feudal Japan, was originally published as Legend of the Five Rings by AEG and ISOMEDIA in 1995. Two years later, AEG released Legend of the Five Rings Roleplaying Game, which used the Rokugan setting. Shortly after its release, AEG published the first in a series of supplements about the clans of Rokugan, The Way of the Dragon. The fourth book in the series, The Way of the Crane, was published in 1999 as a 140-page book written by Andrew P. Morris, Matt Richardson, Steve Ruetledge, Ree Soesbee, Bryan Steele, Rob Vaux, and John Wick, with cover art by Brian Snoddy, and interior art by Audrey Corman, Liz Danforth, Cris Dornaus, Jason Felix, Carl Frank, Scott James, Scott Johnson, K.C. Lancaster, Bradley K. McDevitt, and Ramón K. Pérez.

In 1999, Siroz Productions released a French translation titled La Voie de la Grue.

== Reception ==
In Issue 11 of the French games magazine Backstab, Geoffrey Picard noted, "Beyond the essential description of three philosophies of life, this supplement offers everything one could expect from a clan booklet." However, Picard felt there was one major drawback, commenting, "I couldn't help but feel that this clan was TOO perfect (its members are beautiful, refined, intelligent, honorable, strong...). It becomes tiresome in the long run, and one starts to miss a good, big skeleton in the closet, a truly shameful and unspeakable secret." Picard concluded by giving this book a rating of 7 out of 10, saying, "This supplement is not just useful, it is essential. Because not only does it provide vital information about the game's universe, but above all, it is a key to the world of legends."

In Issue 122 of the French games magazine Casus Belli, Tristan Lhomme commented, "What, in the core rulebook, was merely a stereotypical clan of spineless courtiers takes on its true scope here. There are indeed courtiers, but they are not particularly spineless, and they coexist with families of magicians, artisans, and warriors." Lhomme felt that "The only glaring omission is the lack of information on the imperial court, but most game masters won't need it until they are well into their campaign." Lhomme was disappointed by the scenario included with the French edition, calling it "well-made, nothing more". Lhomme concluded, "Ultimately, this clan book is well-written and useful, but only becomes essential if you're truly fascinated by the Crane Clan."
