= The Way of the Phoenix =

1998 Tabletop fantasy role-playing game supplement

- Cover art by Carl Frank
- Author: Jeff Alexander; Ryan S. Dancey; Marcelo Andres Figueroa; Scott Gearin; Ross A. Isaacs; Patrick Kapera; Jennifer Mahr; Jim Pinto; Ree Soesbee; DJ Trindle; Rob Vaux; John Wick; David Williams
- Illustrator: Carl Frank; Cris Dornaus; Ben Peck
- Series: Way of the Clans
- Genre: Feudal Japan fantasy
- Publisher: Alderac Entertainment Group
- Publication date: 1998; 28 years ago
- Preceded by: The Way of the Lion
- Followed by: The Way of the Naga

The Way of the Phoenix, subtitled "Way of the Clans: Book 7", is a supplement published by the Alderac Entertainment Group (AEG) in 1998 for the fantasy role-playing game Legend of the Five Rings Roleplaying Game. It is the seventh in a series of eleven books describing the clans of Rokugan.

== Contents ==
The Way of the Phoenix describes in detail the Phoenix clan. The book begins with short story. There are sections describing the history of the clan; its social and political structure; the three main families; and profiles of schools only briefly mentioned in the core rulebook. Another chapter introduces new skills, and new advantages and disadvantages — some of which are exclusive to the Phoenix clan. The protocols for magical duels are detailed. Many notable people of the clan are described in detail.

The appendices cover a variety of subjects germane to the clan. There is also a two-page spread about the Phoenix deck used in the Legend of the Five Rings collectible card game.

== Publication history ==
The land of Rokugan, a fictional setting based on feudal Japan, was originally published as Legend of the Five Rings by AEG and ISOMEDIA in 1995. Two years later, AEG released Legend of the Five Rings Roleplaying Game, which used the Rokugan setting. Shortly after its release, AEG published The Way of the Dragon, which detailed one of the seven clans in Rokugan. Over the next two years, AEG released a series of eleven The Way of the ... books that covered the other clans. The seventh to be released was The Way of the Phoenix, a 126-page softcover book published in 1998 that was designed by Jeff Alexander, Ryan S. Dancey, Marcelo Andres Figueroa, Scott Gearin, Ross A. Isaacs, Patrick Kapera, Jennifer Mahr, Jim Pinto, Ree Soesbee, DJ Trindle, Rob Vaux, John Wick, and David Williams, with cover art by Carl Frank, and interior illustrations by Cris Dornaus and Ben Peck.

In 1999, Siroz Publications released a French translation, which added a short scenario designed by Geoffrey Picard.

== Reception ==
The Way of the Phoenix was reviewed in the online second version of Pyramid which said "There are Seven Major Clans in the world of Rokugan. The Way of the Phoenix is the last major clan to get it's [sic] own individualized book. Each of the clans has something that stands out about them. For the Phoenix, that is spellcasting, mysticism and magic in general."

In Issue 14 of the French games magazine Backstab, Geoffrey Picard was not too impressed after a quick read-through, believing it to be just another of the Way of... books. Then he wrote, "But a second, perhaps more attentive, reading revealed some hidden gems within this work ... it's when the Asako family is introduced that this supplement truly shines. It's then that this supplement becomes the final piece of the puzzle begun by the previous books. Indeed, each of them described a fundamental concept of bushido: loyalty, honor, courage, perfection... The Way of the Phoenix describes the most fundamental thing: the path to enlightenment." Picard concluded by giving this book a score of 7 out of 10, saying, "So even if you're not interested in this clan, don't hesitate for a moment: come and discover the most secret of Shinsei's teachings.
