= The Way of the Crab =

Fantasy role-playing game supplement

- Cover art by David Leri
- Author: Cris Dornaus; Zen Faulkes; Ree Soesbee; Rob Vaux; Christian Vikander; John Wicks
- Illustrator: Audrey Corman; Liz Danforth; Cris Dornaus; Jason Felix; Carl Frank; Scott James; Scott Johnson; K.C. Lancaster; Bradley K. McDevitt; Ramón K. Pérez; Brian Snoddy
- Series: Way of the Clans
- Genre: Feudal Japan fantasy
- Publisher: Alderac Entertainment Group
- Publication date: 1998; 28 years ago
- Preceded by: The Way of the Unicorn
- Followed by: The Way of the Crane

The Way of the Crab, subtitled "Way of the Clans: Book 3", is a supplement published by the Alderac Entertainment Group (AEG) in 1998 for the fantasy role-playing game Legend of the Five Rings Roleplaying Game. It is the third in a series of eleven books describing the clans of Rokugan.

== Contents ==
The Way of the Crab describes in detail the Crab Clan, which protects the Emerald Empire from the horrors of the Shadowlands. The book begins with a short story. There are sections describing the history of the clan; its social and political structure; the main families; and profiles of schools only briefly mentioned in the core rulebook. Another chapter introduces new skills, and new advantages and disadvantages — some of which are exclusive to the Crab Clan. Some notable people of the clan are described in detail.

A two-page spread is dedicated to Crab decks for the Legend of Five Rings collectible card game.

The appendices cover the clan's military strategies, the clan's territories, the Kaiu Wall, an overview of the clan's general philosophy and its relations with other clans, and maps of the Hida Citadel and the Kaiu Wall.

The French edition also includes a scenario called "Entre le Ciel et l'Enfer" ("Between Heaven and Hell").

== Publication history ==
The land of Rokugan, a fictional setting based on feudal Japan, was originally published as Legend of the Five Rings by AEG and ISOMEDIA in 1995. Two years later, AEG released Legend of the Five Rings Roleplaying Game, which used the Rokugan setting. Shortly after its release, AEG published the first in a series of supplements about the clans of Rokugan, The Way of the Dragon. The third book in the series, The Way of the Crab, was published in 1998 as a 118-page book written by Cris Dornaus, Zen Faulkes, Ree Soesbee, Rob Vaux, Christian Vikander, and John Wicks, with cover art by David Leri, and interior art by Audrey Corman, Liz Danforth, Cris Dornaus, Jason Felix, Carl Frank, Scott James, Scott Johnson, K.C. Lancaster, Bradley K. McDevitt, Ramón K. Pérez, and Brian Snoddy.

In 1998, Siroz Productions released a French translation titled La Voie du Crab.

== Reception ==
In Issue 11 of the French games magazine Backstab, Geoffrey Picard commented, "I confess, I was expecting the worst when I opened this supplement, which was supposed to be full of 'brute force.' However, I must admit that the authors of this supplement have put my mind at ease: they have indeed managed the remarkable feat of making this clan booklet one of the most interesting published to date." Picard noted, "The brilliance of this supplement lies in its ability to reveal the subtlety hidden at the heart of this clan." Picard concluded by giving this book a rating of 7 out of 10, saying, "This supplement is not just useful, it is essential. Because not only does it provide vital information about the game's universe, but above all, it is a key to the world of legends."

Four issues later, Picard reviewed the French edition of this supplement, and commented, "If you've ever wanted to know how to subtly play a big, bad character, this supplement is for you ... [it] will allow you to discover all the subtleties and intelligence of a clan often wrongly considered a bunch of uncouth barbarians." Picard called the book, "an interesting addition to the overall work. It will prove especially indispensable to any game master wishing to send their group of players into the Shadowlands." Of the scenario added to the French edition, Picard reported, "This addition is more than useful, as it wisely shows us that the Crab Clan is a clan like any other, subject to power struggles and influence peddling. This adventure proves that this supplement isn't just for monster slayers." Picard concluded by giving the French edition a rating of 7 out of 10.

In Issue 119 of the French games magazine Casus Belli, Mehdi Sahmi reviewed the French edition of the supplement and noted, "As usual, I bought everything in English. First, because I didn't want to wait ten years for an overpriced translation. Second, because I figured the French version couldn't possibly be better than the original. And then, bam! For the same price, you get a product that's better maintained, better presented, and better written than the American one!" Sahmi pointed out, "The appendices enhance the supplement's quality ... There's something here for everyone." Sahmi concluded, "In addition to the usual Path of information ... [the French translation by] Siroz offers us a brand new scenario. What more could you ask for?"
