= The Way of the Lion =

Fantasy role-playing game supplement

- Cover art by Randy Gallegos & David Leri
- Author: Marcelo Andres Figueroa; Patrick Kapera; Raymond Lau; Jennifer Mahr; Jim Pinto; Ree Soesbee; Rob Vaux; John Wick; David Williams
- Illustrator: Audrey Corman; Liz Danforth; Cris Dornaus; Jason Felix; Carl Frank; Scott James; Scott Johnson; K.C. Lancaster; Bradley K. McDevitt; Ramón K. Pérez; Brian Snoddy
- Series: Way of the Clans
- Genre: Feudal Japan fantasy
- Publisher: Alderac Entertainment Group
- Publication date: 1999; 27 years ago
- Preceded by: The Way of the Scorpion
- Followed by: The Way of the Phoenix

The Way of the Lion, subtitled "Way of the Clans: Book 6", is a supplement published by the Alderac Entertainment Group (AEG) in 1999 for the fantasy role-playing game Legend of the Five Rings Roleplaying Game. It is the sixth in a series of eleven books describing the clans of Rokugan.

== Contents ==
The Way of the Lion is a supplement in which the history, character options, military tactics, schools, skills, and lore are expanded for the Lion Clan, blending player and gamemaster material throughout.

The Way of the Lion describes in detail the Lion clan, the guardian of the samurai's fighting spirit. The book begins with short story. There are sections describing the history of the clan; its social and political structure; the main families; and profiles of schools only briefly mentioned in the core rulebook. Another chapter introduces new skills, and new advantages and disadvantages — some of which are exclusive to the Lion clan. Some notable people of the clan are described in detail.

== Publication history ==
The land of Rokugan, a fictional setting based on feudal Japan, was originally published as Legend of the Five Rings by AEG and ISOMEDIA in 1995. Two years later, AEG released Legend of the Five Rings Roleplaying Game, which used the Rokugan setting. Shortly after its release, AEG published The Way of the Dragon, which detailed one of the seven clans in Rokugan. Over the next two years, AEG released a series of eleven The Way of the ... books that covered the other clans. The sixth to be released was The Way of the Lion, a 126-page softcover book designed by Marcelo Andres Figueroa, Patrick Kapera, Raymond Lau, Jennifer Mahr, Jim Pinto, Ree Soesbee, Rob Vaux, John Wick, and David Williams, with cover art by Randy Gallegos and David Leri, and interior illustrations by Audrey Corman, Liz Danforth, Cris Dornaus, Jason Felix, Carl Frank, Scott James, Scott Johnson, K.C. Lancaster, Bradley McDevitt, Ramón K. Pérez, and Brian Snoddy.

In 1999, Siroz Publications released a French translation titled La Voie du Lion that added a short scenario designed by Geoffrey Picard.

== Reception ==
In Issue 117 of the French games magazine Casus Belli, Mehdi Sahmi thought that this book, the sixth in the series, lacked any new truths about Legend of the Five Rings, noting, "Despite being more of the same, The Way of the Lion is rather successful. But it is desperately banal ... Like the other Way of... books, Lion is essential but lacks real originality."

In Issue 12 of the French games magazine Backstab, Geoffrey Picard commented, "Continuing its relentless series of clan books, AEG presents us today with the latest addition to the L5R line, and it's safe to say that it's yet another success ... This work is the perfect explanation of the Eastern maxim that states, 'Duty is a mountain, but death is a feather.'" Picard concluded by giving this book a rating of 7 out of 10, saying, "In short, A MUST READ "
