= The Way of the Minor Clans =

1999 fantasy role-playing game supplement

- Cover art by Carl Frank
- Author: Shawn Carman; Richard Dakan; Kenyon Daniels; Patrick Kapera; Kevin Long; John R. Phythyon, Jr.; Ree Soesbee; Rob Vaux, Rich Wulf
- Illustrator: Carl Frank; Cris Dornaus; Rob Hinds; Scott James; Ben Peck
- Series: Way of the Clans
- Genre: Feudal Japan fantasy
- Publisher: Alderac Entertainment Group
- Publication date: 1999; 27 years ago
- Preceded by: The Way of the Naga
- Followed by: The Way of the Wolf

The Way of the Minor Clans, subtitled "Way of the Clans: Book 9", is a supplement published by the Alderac Entertainment Group (AEG) in 1999 for the fantasy role-playing game Legend of the Five Rings Roleplaying Game. It is the ninth in a series of eleven books describing the clans of Rokugan.

== Contents ==
Previous books in the Way of... series of supplements describe the major clans of Rokugan that dominate its geographical and political landscapes. The Way of the Minor Clans describes in detail nine minor clans — Mantis, Fox, Dragonfly, Sparrow, Badger, Centipede, Falcon, Tortoise, and Wasp — as well as three "lost" clans that have been destroyed.</ref name=pyramid />

The book begins with short story, and then is divided into ten chapters. Each of the first nine chapters is dedicated to a minor clan, and the tenth and final chapter describes the lost clans. Each chapter details the history of the clan; its social and political structure; the main families; new skills; the clan's school; and some notable people of the clan.

The French edition also includes a short scenario titled "Les sept poèmes du Moineau" ("The Seven Poems of the Sparrow").

== Publication history ==
The land of Rokugan, a fictional setting based on feudal Japan, was originally published as Legend of the Five Rings by AEG and ISOMEDIA in 1995. Two years later, AEG released Legend of the Five Rings Roleplaying Game, which used the Rokugan setting. Shortly after its release, AEG published The Way of the Dragon, which detailed one of the seven major clans in Rokugan. Over the next two years, AEG released a series of eleven The Way of the ... books that covered the other clans. The ninth to be released was The Way of the Minor Clans , a 128-page softcover book published in 1999 that was designed by Shawn Carman, Richard Dakan, Kenyon Daniels, Patrick Kapera, Kevin Long, John R. Phythyon, Jr., Ree Soesbee, Rob Vaux, and Rich Wulf, with cover art by Carl Frank, and interior illustrations by Cris Dornaus, Rob Hinds, Scott James, and Ben Peck.

In 1999, Siroz Publications released a French translation titled "La Voie des Clans Mineurs", which added a short scenario.

== Reception ==
Kai Saarto reviewed this supplement for Pyramid and wrote, "Overall, this is a great book for [gamemasters] who plan to use the Minor Clans in their campaigns. It has tons of information, new Schools, skills, spells and much more." Saarto was not a fan of the illustrations, noting, "The artwork is not too bad, but it's not spectacular either." Saarto concluded, "The only bad thing I can say about Way of the Minor Clans is that it should have been released earlier, since some plot hooks are only useful for really old adventures."

In Issue 21 of the French games magazine Backstab, Geoffrey Picard commented, "This book offers a breath of fresh air to players wishing to create new and original characters, as well as a vast source of adventure for any game master. The descriptions of the different clans are often captivating." Picard concluded, "With this supplement, the [Legend of the Five Books] universe opens onto new horizons, a jungle where small clans struggle to survive the machinations of the major clans and the plots of their peers. Ultimately, Way of the Minor Clans emerges as an essential supplement to the line, offering a fresh and original perspective on the Empire of Rokugan

== Other reviews and commentary ==
- Game Trade Magazine (Issue 4 - Jun 2000)
