= The Way of the Unicorn =

Fantasy role-playing game supplement

- Cover art by Carl Frank
- Author: Edward S. Bolme; Cris Dornaus; Marcelo Andres Figueroa; Andrew Heckt; Jennifer Mahr; Ree Soesbee; Steve Swarner; Rob Vaux; David Williams; Maureen Yates
- Illustrator: Toren Atkinson; Mary Lee Bryning; Catherine H. Burnett; Matthew Cavotta; Ronald Chironna; Cris Dornaus; Jason Felix; Erik Olson; Michael Phillippi; Thom Roman; [lex Sheikman; Brian Snoddy; Joshua Gabriel Timbrook
- Series: Way of the Clans
- Genre: Feudal Japan fantasy
- Publisher: Alderac Entertainment Group
- Publication date: 1997; 29 years ago
- Preceded by: The Way of the Dragon
- Followed by: The Way of the Crab

The Way of the Unicorn, subtitled "Way of the Clans: Book 2", is a supplement published by the Alderac Entertainment Group (AEG) in 1997 for the fantasy role-playing game Legend of the Five Rings Roleplaying Game. It is the second in a series of elevenbooks describing the clans of Rokugan.

== Contents ==
The Way of the Unicorn describes in detail the Unicorn Clan, which started in Rokugan 800 years ago, then left and wandered the world until their recent return. The book begins with a short story. There are sections describing the history of the clan; its social and political structure; the main families; and profiles of schools only briefly mentioned in the core rulebook. Another chapter introduces new skills, and new advantages and disadvantages — some of which are exclusive to the Unicorn Clan. Some notable people of the clan are described in detail.

A two-page spread is dedicated to Unicorn decks for the Legend of Five Rings collectible card game.

The appendices cover cavalry-related military strategies, Unicorn Clan treasures, spells, magical items, adventure inspirations, descriptions of the geography of the various provinces, and maps of Shinjo Castle.

In the French edition, there are two extra appendices: one covers the duties and functions of magistrates, and how to integrate a magistrate character into the game; the other is a ten-page scenario called "Le dernier voyage" ("The Last Journey").

== Publication history ==
The land of Rokugan, a fictional setting based on feudal Japan, was originally published as Legend of the Five Rings by AEG and ISOMEDIA in 1995. Two years later, AEG released Legend of the Five Rings Roleplaying Game, which used the Rokugan setting. Shortly after its release, AEG published the first in a series of supplements about the clans of Rokugan, The Way of the Dragon. The second book in the series, The Way of the Unicorn, was published in 1997 as a 122-page book written by Edward S. Bolme, Cris Dornaus, Marcelo Andres Figueroa, Andrew Heckt, Jennifer Mahr, Ree Soesbee, Steve Swarner, Rob Vaux, David Williams, and Maureen Yates, with cover art by Carl Frank, and interior art by Toren Atkinson, Mary Lee Bryning, Catherine H. Burnett, Matthew Cavotta, Ronald Chironna, Cris Dornaus, Jason Felix, Erik Olson, Michael Phillippi, Thom Roman, Alex Sheikman, Brian Snoddy, and Joshua Gabriel Timbrook.

In 1998, Siroz Productions released a French translation titled La Voie de la Licorn.

== Reception ==
In Issue 8 of the French games magazine Backstab, Geoffrey Picard commented, "Given the very high standards set [by the previous book in the series, The Way of the Dragon], I opened Way of the Unicorn with some trepidation. However, this apprehension quickly gave way to immense pleasure because, far from seeming like a mere imitation of their first supplement, it is the privileged gateway to discovering the mysteries of the L5R world." Picard concluded, "This work immediately establishes itself as an essential supplement ... After only a few months in existence, the L5R line is shaping up to be one of the most consistent and promising on the current market. For those of you who don't yet know this game, I'll just say one thing: give it a try!"

In Issue 117 of the French games magazine Casus Belli, Mehdi Sahmi noted, "The first pleasant surprise lies in the fascinating history of the Ki-Rin clan, which became the Unicorn Clan." Sahmi also commented, "The appendices enhance the supplement's quality." Sahmi concluded, "In short, if all the Way of... supplements are of the same calibre as those dedicated to the Dragon and Unicorn Clans, no self-respecting fan of the excellent Legend of the Five Rings RPG can afford to miss out."
