= Ree Soesbee =

American game designer and novelist

Ree Soesbee is an American game designer of collectible card games, role-playing games, and massively multiplayer online role-playing games (MMORPGs), as well as a writer of primarily fantasy novels.

== Early life and education ==
After Soesbee's mother died when she was six years old, a relative gave her a copy of the 1983 red box edition of Dungeons & Dragons. Her father, believing that the game led to demon worship, refused to let her play and hid it away. She became fascinated by the game as a result, and a pattern ensued where she would find it and play, and her father would hide it again. At the same time, she and her father watched episodes of Star Trek together. These two factors early in her life helped to develop an interest in both role-playing games and science fiction.

She continued to play various role-playing games through her childhood and early adulthood, including Cyberpunk, Shadowrun, and Paranoia.

== Writer ==
Soesbee completed an MA in English literature at the University of North Carolina at Chapel Hill, writing her thesis on Sir Gawain and the Green Knight. While she was working on her doctoral thesis about Edo period literature, she started to write short fiction stories based on the Legend of the Five Rings Roleplaying Game. She submitted some of them to the game's publisher, Alderac Entertainment Group (AEG), and she was subsequently asked to write a sourcebook for the game, Way of the Crane. She completed that as freelance work while still working on her thesis. AEG then asked her to join their staff full-time to work on more sourcebooks as well as the Legend of the Five Rings collectible card game (CCG). She subsequently decided to leave school without finishing her dissertation.

== Alderac Entertainment Group ==
One of her first projects at AEG was to help her roommate Kevin Millard design the CCG Warlock. She also wrote or provided material for many Legend of the Five Rings projects including the adventure Code of Bushido (1998), Night of a Thousand Screams (1998), and The Book of the Shadowlands (1998) in addition to continuing to write short fiction and novels for the setting.

She was also a contributor to sourcebooks and adventures for other role-playing games, including

- The Way of Kolinar (1999), a sourcebook for the Star Trek: The Next Generation Role-playing Game (Wizards of the Coast)
- 7th Sea Game Master's Guide (1999), and 7th Sea Players' Guide (2000), for the 7th Sea RPG (AEG)
- Clanbook: Tremere (2000) for Vampire: The Masquerade (White Wolf Publishing)
- Adventure II (2004), a revision of an older anthology of d20 System scenarios (AEG)

On her own, Soesbee also designed several different projects:

- Jerimond's Orb (2000), a generic d20 System adventure (AEG)
- Blood on White Petals (2001), a d20 System "mini-module" in a medieval Japanese setting (AEG)
- Aztecs: Empire of the Burning Sun (2002), a d20 System campaign set in the Aztec Empire (Avalanche Press)

In 2000, AEG decided to publish a series of seven Clan War novels based on Legend of Five Rings, and Soesbee was asked to write two of them, The Crane (2000) and The Dragon (2001). Tom Findlay of The Sun-Herald gave The Dragon a positive review. This was followed by the five-book Four Winds Saga series, and she again wrote two of them, Wind of Honour (2002) and Wind of Truth (2003).

In 2002, Soesbee, John Phythyon and Mike Bennighof wrote Celtic Age: Roleplaying the Myths, Heroes, and Monsters of the Celts, a d20 System sourcebook published by Avalanche Press detailing the Celtic people of Great Britain. It won the 2002 Origins Award for "Best Role-Playing Game Supplement".

== Dragonlance young adult novels ==
Soesbee then moved from the Japanese background of the Legend of the Five Rings universe to the swords & sorcery setting of Dragonlance. Starting in 2004, Wizards of the Coast (WotC) published the New Adventures series, young adult novels set in their popular Dragonlance world of Krynn. The first eight novels, the Spellbinder Quartet and Dragon Quartet, followed the adventures of a band of eight young adventurers. Soesbee wrote the first book of the Dragon Quartet, Dragon Sword (2005).

When the two initial series finished, WotC then commissioned various authors to each produce a trilogy of novels based on one of the members of the original band of young adventurers. Soesbee wrote the "Elidor" trilogy about the elven thief Elidor: Crown of Thieves (2005), The Crystal Chalice (2006), and City of Fortune (2006). Crown of Thieves was included on Maja Beckstrom's recommended list of books about elves for young readers that appeared in the St. Paul Pioneer Press.

She then wrote the Elements Trilogy about another member of the band, the young wizard-in-training Nearra: Pillar of Flame (2007), Queen of the Sea (2007), and Tempest's Vow (2008). She also wrote one book of the eight-book Dragon Codices series, Black Dragon Codex (2008).

== MMORPG gameworld designer ==
In 2006, Soesbee was hired by ArenaNet to work on developing campaigns for the MMORPG Guild Wars. Her first project was adding material to the Guild Wars Nightfall campaign that had been developed by Jeff Grubb, as well as material for Guild Wars: Eye of the North. She also created "hero chatter" — comments made by a player's entourage of heroes when the player enters various areas.

She then started working with Grubb on Guild Wars 2 as Narrative, Lore and Continuity Designer, creating an expanded version of the game with the Guild Wars storyline pushed 250 years into the future; after several years of development, Guild Wars 2 was released in 2012.

ArenaNet also released a line of novels based on the Guild Wars 2 setting; Soesbee wrote the third novel in that line, Sea of Sorrows.

== Awards ==
- 2002 Origins Award for "Best Role-Playing Game Supplement": Celtic Age: Roleplaying the Myths, Heroes, and Monsters of the Celts (with John R. Phythyon Jr. and Mike Bennighof)

== Publications ==
=== As sole author ===
Legend of the Five Rings sourcebooks

- The Way of the Crane (1998)

d20 System adventures and sourcebooks

- Jerimond's Orb (2000, AEG)
- Blood on White Petals (2001, AEG)
- Aztecs: Empire of the Burning Sun (2002, Avalanche Press)

Dragonlance New Adventures sourcebooks (WotC)

- Dragon Codices
  - Black Dragon Codex (2008)

Novels

- Clan War series based on Legend of the Five Rings (AEG)
  - The Crane (2000)
  - The Dragon (2001)
- Four Winds Saga based on Legend of the Five Rings (AEG)
  - Wind of Honour (2002)
  - Wind of Truth (2003)
- Dragonlance New Adventures (WotC)
  - Dragon Quartet
    - Dragon Sword (2005)
  - Elidor Trilogy
    - Crown of Thieves (2005)
    - The Crystal Chalice (2006)
    - City of Fortune (2006)
  - Elements Trilogy
    - Pillar of Flame (2007)
    - Queen of the Sea (2007)
    - Tempest's Vow (2008)
- Guild Wars 2 (ArenaNet)
  - Sea of Sorrows (2013)

=== As primary or co-author ===
Legend of the Five Rings (AEG)

- Code of Bushido (1998)
- Night of a Thousand Screams (1998)
- The Way of the Lion (1998)
- The Way of the Phoenix (1998)
- The Way of the Crane (1999)
- The Way of the Naga (1999)
- The Way of the Minor Clans (1999)
- Winter Court: Kyuden Seppun (1999)
- Unexpected Allies (1999)
- Winter Court: Kyuden Kakita (2000)
- Legend of the Five Rings Second Edition: Player's Guide (2000)

7th Sea (AEG)

- Vodacce (2000)
- Ussura (2001)
- Sophia's Daughters (2001)

=== As contributor ===
Legend of the Five Rings (AEG)

- The Way of the Unicorn (1998)
- The Way of the Crab (1998)
- The Book of the Shadowlands (1998)
- The Way of the Scorpion (1998)
- Walking the Way (1998)
- GM's Survival Guide (1999)
- The Way of the Wolf (1999)
- The Way of Shinsei (2000)

7th Sea (AEG)

- 7th Sea Player's Guide (2000)
- 7th Sea Game Master's Guide (2000)
- Waves of Blood (2001)

Star Trek: The Next Generation Role-playing Game (WotC)

- The Way of Kolinar (1999)

7th Sea (AEG)

- 7th Sea Gamemaster Guide (1999)
- 7th Sea Players Handbook (2000)

Vampire: The Masquerade (White Wolf Publishing)

- Clanbook: Tremere (2000)
- Mind's Eye Theatre (2014)

d20 System

- Adventure II (2004, AEG)
- Celtic Age: Roleplaying the Myths, Heroes, and Monsters of the Celts (2002)
