= The Way of the Naga =

1999 Tabletop fantasy role-playing game supplement

- Cover art by Randy Elliot
- Author: Ree Soesbee; Patrick Kapera
- Illustrator: Cris Dornaus; Rob Hinds; Scott James; Ben Peck
- Series: Way of the Clans
- Genre: Feudal Japan fantasy
- Publisher: Alderac Entertainment Group
- Publication date: 1999; 27 years ago
- Preceded by: The Way of the Phoenix
- Followed by: The Way of the Minor Clans

The Way of the Naga, subtitled "Way of the Clans: Book 8", is a supplement published by the Alderac Entertainment Group (AEG) in 1999 for the fantasy role-playing game Legend of the Five Rings Roleplaying Game. It is the eighth in a series of eleven books describing the clans of Rokugan.

== Contents ==
The Way of the Naga describes in detail the race of half-humanoid/half-snake people known as the Naga, who have just awakened from a thousand year dormancy. The book begins with a series of stories about the Naga as told by various characters. The next chapter describes the physical, cultural, and religious aspects of the Naga, as well the Akasha, the collective mind to which all Naga are mentally connected. The longest chapter describes the various lineages: Vipers, Chameleons, Cobras, Constrictors, and Snakes.

The appendices describe Naga cities, and the ruins buried beneath the Shinomen Forest. There is a section of advice for the gamemaster on how to incorporate naga into a campaign.

The French edition also includes a short scenario titled "Nulle bête aussi féroce" ("No Beast So Ferocious")

== Publication history ==
The land of Rokugan, a fictional setting based on feudal Japan, was originally published as Legend of the Five Rings by AEG and ISOMEDIA in 1995. Two years later, AEG released Legend of the Five Rings Roleplaying Game, which used the Rokugan setting. Shortly after its release, AEG published The Way of the Dragon, which detailed one of the seven clans in Rokugan. Over the next three years, AEG released a series of eleven Way of the Clan books. The eighth to be released was The Way of the Naga, a 144-page softcover book published in 1999 that was designed by Ree Soesbee and Patrick Kapera, with cover art by Randy Elliot, and interior illustrations by Cris Dornaus, Rob Hinds, Scott James, and Ben Peck.

In 2001, Siroz Publications released a French translation, which added a short scenario designed by Geoffrey Picard.

== Reception ==
In Issue 30 of the French games magazine Backstab, Michaël Croitoriu reviewed the French edition and noted, "This supplement provides all the tools needed to make naga fully playable in a campaign: character creation rules, advantages, skills, schools, inheritance tables, and more." Croitoriu thought the publication of this book was timely, writing, "The Way of the Naga arrives at just the right time. Between the start of the Clan Wars and the upcoming [French] translation of the second edition [of Legend of the Five Rings], there are plenty of reasons to integrate naga into your campaign. In addition, the scenario [in the French edition] offers an interesting way to do so."
