= The Way of the Scorpion =

Tabletop fantasy role-playing game supplement

- Cover art by David Leri
- Author: Patrick Kapera; Jennifer Mahr; Ree Soesbee; D.J. Trindle; John Wick; David Williams
- Series: Way of the Clans
- Genre: Feudal Japan fantasy
- Publisher: Alderac Entertainment Group
- Publication date: 1999; 27 years ago
- Preceded by: The Way of the Crane
- Followed by: The Way of the Lion

The Way of the Scorpion, subtitled "The Way of the Clans: Book 5", is a supplement published by Alderac Entertainment Group (AEG) in 1999 for the fantasy role-playing game Legend of the Five Rings Roleplaying Game. It was the fifth in a series of eleven books outlining the clans of Rokugan.

== Contents ==
Of the seven clans of Rokugan, the Scorpion clan is the most secretive, lawless and anti-social. The Way of the Scorpion describes this clan in detail for the player looking to create a Scorpion Clan character, and for the gamemaster seeking to integrate the nefarious activities of the clan into the campaign. The book begins with short story, followed by sections describing the history of the clan; its social and political structure; and profiles of schools only briefly mentioned in the core rulebook. Another chapter introduces new skills, and new advantages and disadvantages — some of which are exclusive to the Scorpion clan. Some notable people of the clan are also described in detail. In the French version of this book, the book ends with a short scenario.

The appendices cover a variety of subjects germane to the clan such as its ethics, loyalty, combat etiquette, honor and betrayal.

The French addition also includes a short scenario titled "Le Crépuscule de l'Honneur" ("Twilight of Honor").

== Publication history ==
The land of Rokugan, a fictional role-playing setting based on feudal Japan, was originally published as Legend of the Five Rings by AEG and ISOMEDIA in 1995. Two years later, AEG released Legend of the Five Rings Roleplaying Game, which used the Rokugan setting. Shortly after its release, AEG published The Way of the Dragon, which detailed one of the seven clans in Rokugan. Over the next two years, AEG released a series of ten The Way of the ... books that covered the other clans. The fifth to be released was The Way of the Scorpion, a 118-page softcover book published in 1999, designed by Patrick Kapera, Jennifer Mahr, Ree Soesbee, D.J. Trindle, John Wick, and David Williams, with cover art by David Leri, and interior illustrations by Mary Lee Bryning, Audrey Corman, James A. Crabtree, Cris Dornaus, Scott James, Jennifer Mahr, and Ramón K. Pérez.

In 1998, Siroz Productions released a French translation of Legend of Five Rings titled Le Livre de Cinq Anneaux, and the following year began to release French translations of The Way of... series, including La Voie du Scorpion. The French books in this series each concluded with the addition of a short scenario.

== Reception ==
The Way of the Scorpion was reviewed in the online second version of Pyramid which said "The first chapter, the Subtle Scorpion, starts off with tales that describe the Scorpion's presence in Rokugan, as well as a brief history detailing why the Scorpion clan behaves as it does. The stories are short enough that they don't distract, and the history makes the Scorpion seem noble in their efforts to do the dirty work of the Emperor.."

In Issue 11 of the French games magazine Backstab, Geoffrey Picard liked the book, writing, "The short stories are absolutely exhilarating (and teeming with adventure ideas), and the technical section is illustrated with numerous very useful tips." Picard concluded by giving this book a rating of 6 out of 10, saying, "The Scorpion Clan perfectly illustrates the subtle rules of etiquette in this universe, and this book is probably the best tool L5R game masters can currently find.

Four issues later, Picard reviewed the new French translation, and commented, "This book will give you practical, useful, and intelligent advice to help you integrate a samurai from this clan into your gaming group. It will allow you to understand why the Scorpion Clan still exists today (which wouldn't be the case if it were simply a den of scoundrels)." Picard liked the scenario added to the French edition, pointing out, "This scenario is designed for a group of adventurers with a strong combat bent. However, beware the slumbering brutes within every group: the first part of this adventure will demand considerable diplomatic and investigative skills." Picard concluded, "This supplement succeeds in making us understand that the Way of the Scorpion is also the way of loyalty, the way of honor."

In Issue 116 of the French games magazine Casus Belli, Matthias Twardowski noted, "The fifth in the Clan series, it is one of the most successful because it explains, demonstrates, and justifies the existence of the Scorpions, even managing to make them indispensable. All of this constitutes a veritable apologia for cynicism and dishonesty, a delightful read that can be used for many other games." However, Twardowski questioned the chapter on ninjas, pointing out that "it completely contradicts the core rulebook ... [demonstrating] one of the main problems with the line: the lack of cohesion and editorial direction. With each new release, it becomes clear that the authors are writing what they invent as they go along, without always considering the overall coherence." Despite this, Twadowski concluded, "Way of the Scorpion is the most essential Clan supplement."

Five issue later, Mehdi Sahmi reviewed the French translation and commented, "I'm increasingly regretting having bought the original English version of the game, because the French version is very well-crafted. That being said, the essential point I should make is that the book dedicated to Scorpions is probably the best in the series." Sahmi concluded, "This supplement is excellent and you should buy it."

== Reviews ==
- Realms of Fantasy
