= The Way of the Wolf =

2000 Role-playing game supplement

- Cover art by Carl Frank
- Author: Ree Soesbee; Shawn Carman; Rich Wulf
- Illustrator: Edward James Krings; Daniel Moenster
- Series: Way of the Clans
- Genre: Feudal Japan fantasy
- Publisher: Alderac Entertainment Group
- Publication date: 2000; 26 years ago
- Preceded by: The Way of the Minor Clans
- Followed by: The Way of Shinsei

The Way of the Wolf, subtitled "Way of the Clans: Book 10", is a supplement published by the Alderac Entertainment Group (AEG) in 2000 for the fantasy role-playing game Legend of the Five Rings Roleplaying Game. It is the tenth in a series of eleven books describing the clans of Rokugan.

== Contents ==
The Way of the Wolf describes in detail ronin, the masterless samurai. The book begins with a short story followed by five chapters:

1. "The History of the Wave Men": Various backgrounds and legends of ronin, as well as a short history of famous ronin of the past.
2. "Character": Rules and guidelines for creating ronin characters
3. "Who's Who Among the Ronin": Fifteen notable ronin.
4. "Sample Ronin Character": Six ronin archetypes.

The appendices include various types of information such as how to survive as a ronin, the attitudes of various clans towards ronin, life on the road, equipment, spells, and for the gamemaster, how to incorporate a ronin non-player character into a campaign.

The French edition also includes a short scenario titled "La Vallée des Papillons" ("Valley of the Butterflies").

== Publication history ==
The land of Rokugan, a fictional setting based on feudal Japan, was originally published as Legend of the Five Rings by AEG and ISOMEDIA in 1995. Two years later, AEG released Legend of the Five Rings Roleplaying Game, which used the Rokugan setting. Shortly after its release, AEG published The Way of the Dragon, which detailed one of the clans in Rokugan. Over the next two years, AEG released a series of eleven Way of the Clans books that covered the other clans. The tenth to be released was The Way of the Wolf, a 128-page softcover book published in 2000 that was designed by Ree Soesbee, Shawn Carman and Rich Wulf with cover art by Carl Frank, and interior illustrations by Edward James Krings and Daniel Moenster.

In 2000, Siroz Productions released a French translation titled La Voie du Loup.

== Reception ==
Joe G. Kushner reviewed this book for Pyramid and noted that although this was the tenth book in a series that followed a specific format, "The good news is that while the format may be standard, Ronin, by their very nature are not. The different tales about Ronin in Chapter One give the GM a good idea of the numerous types of origins Ronin can have." Kushner concluded, "The Way of the Wolf, along with the Minor Clans supplement, can produce some of the more interesting and memorable characters in a Legend of the Five Rings and this book succeeds in making them not only more viable as a character type, but more capable of surviving among their peers.

In Issue 24 of the French games magazine Backstab, Geoffrey Picard noted "This supplement perfectly fulfills its purpose. It is an inexhaustible source of inspiration for the game master, who will find ample material to liven up their campaign. Players haven't been forgotten either, as they will find all the necessary information to portray such a character." Picard concluded by giving this book a rating of 4 out of 5, writing, "In short, a useful and interesting supplement."

Two issues later, Michaël Croitoriu reviewed the French edition of this supplement, and was very pleased by the adventure that had been added, calling it "an excellent scenario ... in which the players must walk a fine line to save a lost gaijin enclave deep within the former lands of the Scorpion Clan." Croitoriu concluded by giving this book a rating of 4 out of 5.
