= The Book of the Shadowlands: The Writings of Kuni Mokuna =

Fantasy role-playing game supplement

The Book of the Shadowlands
The Writings of Kuni Mokuna
- Cover art by Brom
- Designers: Cris Dornaus; Ross A. Isaacs; Ree Soesbee; Greg Stolze; Rob Vaux; John Wick
- Illustrators: Brom; Cris Dornaus; Carl Frank
- Publishers: Alderac Entertainment Group
- Publication: 1997; 29 years ago
- Genres: Fantasy
- Systems: D10 Roll & Keep

The Book of the Shadowlands: The Writings of Kuni Mokuna is a supplement published by Alderac Entertainment Group (AEG) in 1997 for the fantasy role-playing game Legend of the Five Rings Roleplaying Game that details the cursed region called The Shadowlands.

== Contents ==
The Book of the Shadowlands is written as if by Kuni Mokuna, a shugenja of the Crab Clan, who is setting out what he knows of the creatures of the feared region known as The Shadowlands. The book is divideed into sevenchapters:

1. Description of the region and its origin.
2. The corrupting effects of the Shadowlands on humans, and rules for player characters who might be affected, including effects, treatments, and protections.
3. The goblin race, both individually and as a society.
4. Ogres and trolls
5. Demons known as oni. Twenty species are described, and a map of their typical habitat is shown. (For the gamemaster, advice is given on how to integrate oni into a campaign.)
6. Other dangers, including various flora and fauna.
7. The Nezumi, a hybrid rat/human race who could be a valuable ally.

== Publication history ==
In 1995, AEG published the fantasy role-playing game Legend of the Five Rings, based roughly on feudal Japan with influences from other East Asian cultures such as China, Mongolia and Korea. A series of supplements followed, including The Book of the Shadowlands, a 160-page hardcover book published in 1998 that was designed by Cris Dornaus, Ross A. Isaacs, Ree Soesbee, Greg Stolze, Rob Vaux, and John Wick, with cover art by Brom, and interior art by Dornaus and Carl Frank.

== Reception ==
The Book of the Shadowlands was reviewed in the online second version of Pyramid which said "The Book of the Shadowlands purports to be the journal of Kuni Mokuna, a Crab Clan shugenja (wizard-priest), who traveled extensively in the Shadowlands, documenting its many repulsive features. It's been helpfully "translated" by Cris Dornaus and Rob Vaux, who've managed a fine job of getting across the personality of this self-justifying lunatic, a man who spends his time dissecting trolls and visiting goblins, much to his Clan's disgust. The layout is cleverly done, with Mokuna's text "handwritten" on parchment, and game statistics and rules in sidebars when needed. There are also excellent illustrations on almost every page, which give a suitably brooding air to the book even before you start reading it."

In Issue 9 of the French games magazine Backstab, Geoffrey Picard called this book "not only enjoyable to read but also very interesting." The only problem Picard found was the lack of detailed maps of the region, and the lack of a sample scenario. Despite these issues, Picard noted, "game masters will easily find plenty to fuel their inspiration. This book abounds with colorful characters, locations, and usable ideas." Picard concluded by giving this book a rating of 8 out of 10, saying, "The authors have managed to avoid simply creating a commercial gamemaster's manual, offering us instead a high-quality supplement that will quickly prove indispensable to any Legend of the Five Rings gamemaster."

A year later, in Issue 15, Michaël Croitoriu reviewed the French translation and called it "nothing more than a bestiary designed to introduce you to the delightful fauna inhabiting the Shadowlands. Here, the authors deliver a bland string of characteristics for creatures, each more powerful than the last." Croitoriu found the book "more enjoyable to read because it is written in the style of the travel journal of a famous shugenja from the Kuni family." But Croitoriu found some issues with this book, writing, "I still regret that the authors didn't provide us with some more intelligent creatures than the piles of teeth and claws described in this book." Croitoriu also questioned the amount of material provided, pointing out "the somewhat sparse presentation of the text. At times, it feels like half the pages would have sufficed, which would probably have cost considerably less." Despite these problems, Croitoriu concluded by giving this book a rating of 7 out of 10, saying, "This interesting supplement will quickly prove indispensable if you wish to use the Shadowlands and Fu Leng's corruption in your campaign. On the other hand, if you're more interested in political intrigue, look elsewhere."
