= Houses of the Blooded =

Tabletop fantasy role-playing game by John Wick

- Designers: John Wick
- Publishers: John Wick Presents
- Publication: 2008
- Genres: Fantasy

Houses of the Blooded is a roleplaying game designed by John Wick and released in July 2008. Its author has described it as the "anti-Dungeons & Dragons roleplaying game," emphasizing elements of the fantasy genre that D&D overlooks. Taking a more swords and sorcery approach (rather than "generic fantasy"), the game focuses on romance, intrigue, courtly dangers, and domain management.

== Overview ==
Players tell the story of the tragic and doomed race called the ven, on a world called Shanri. Both Shanri and the ven previously appeared in Wick's game Enemy Gods. The ven appear much like humans, but are stronger, faster, and more beautiful, and are also emotional powerhouses, emphasising all emotions with capital letters (Love, Hate, Fear, etc.).

Players in Houses of the Blooded take the roles of minor nobles responsible for great domains who own land, people, and power. As they struggle to maintain their own standing, they must solve the troubles that arise in their lands while plotting to expand their own power. The game's atmosphere leans towards swashbuckling adventure, layered with political intrigue as players seek to amass power.

== Game system ==
Each player character is defined by five virtues with a range of 1–3 and one weakness. During character creation, the player must decide which of the following are virtues and which is the weakness: strength, cunning, courage, beauty, wisdom, and prowess. Each player also decides on their character's skills, which are all defined by "invoke" (the effect when the character uses that skill); "tag" (the disadvantage resulting from possessing that skill); and "compel" (how another character could force the character to use that skill). For an example, a highly trained athlete could use their training to complete an action (invoke); but the long periods of physical exercise needed take away from other necessary activities (tag); and the character might be vulnerable to challenges to prove their physical skill (invoke).

The game system uses only six-sided dice. When a player wants their character to perform a slightly dangerous action, they look at their character sheet and find applicable elements, such as stating their name, a characteristic, a skill, an item, etc. Each applicable element adds one die to the pool of dice to be rolled. The goal is simply to exceed 10 with the sum of the dice rolls, which grants the "privilege" — the ability to describe the outcome of the action. Of course, a player will often end up with far more dice than needed. In that case, they can choose to set some dice aside, and if they succeed on their roll, each set-aside die allows them to add an element to their description of the result. As Phil Vecchione noted, "when the player wins narrative control they can decide if their character succeeded or failed, based on what is more interesting."

The player can also, on the fly, make a Risk challenge in order to seize control of the narrative. For example, if the players come upon the scene of a recent meal, a player winning a Risk challenge could declare what the meal consisted of, how long ago it was made, and describe signs of a struggle or other foul play.

Designer John Wick credited the game system to two chief inspirations: octaNe by Jared Sorensen; and the FATE System by Evil Hat Productions. Houses of the Blooded uses "aspects," a key element of the FATE System. The use of Risk (challenge) "wagers" — the mechanic allowing players to take control of the narrative — was inspired by the mechanics of octaNe.

== Publication history ==
Houses of the Blooded (2008) is John Wick's "anti-D&D" roleplaying game, emphasizing tragedy, romance, and revenge over dungeon crawls and loot. Wick spent two years developing and playtesting the game, which became a critical success and sold out its first print run within a year. It later spawned supplements, a novel, a LARP, and the samurai-themed spin-off Blood & Honor (2010), cementing its place as a cornerstone of Wick's modern catalog. In 2009, the second printing of Houses of the Blooded marked the transition from Wicked Dead Brewing Company to John Wick Presents, signaling a new era for Wick's publishing. While continuing to support Houses of the Blooded with spinoffs like Blood & Tears and Blood & Honor, Wick also launched new projects under the John Wick Presents label, including Curse of the Yellow Sign and several "little games" such as The Shotgun Diaries and Yesterday's Tomorrows. This period established Wick's reputation for prolific indie RPG design and set the stage for later major works like The Big Book of Little Games, The Aegis Project, and Wicked Fantasy.

== Reception ==
Phil Vecchione, writing for Gnome Stew, admired the Risk challenge system, calling it "a great mechanic ... There is a very different kind of prep [a gamemaster must] do for a session, when your players can declare a statement and take the game into a new direction with every Risk. It becomes more about setting up interesting situations and then hanging on to see where the players will drive it."

== Awards ==
At the 2008 Indie RPG Awards, Houses of the Blooded was the runner-up in three categories: "Game of the Year", "Best Support", and "Best Production".
