= Lesser of Two Evils (Legend of the Five Rings) =

Lesser of Two Evils is a 2000 role-playing game adventure published by Alderac Entertainment Group for Legend of the Five Rings Roleplaying Game.

== Contents ==
Lesser of Two Evils is an adventure in which Lord Yasuki Rama's long‑hidden corruption forces him to beg the player characters to save an illicit Shadowlands shrine whose plight now threatens to expose his crimes and reveal where the true evil resides.

== Reviews ==
- Backstab #31 (as "Le Moindre Mal")
- Realms of Fantasy
