= Walking the Way: The Lost Spells of Rokugan =

Tabletop fantasy role-playing game supplement

Walking the Way
The Lost Spells of Rokugan
- Publishers: Alderac Entertainment Group
- Publication: 1998; 28 years ago
- Genres: Fantasy
- Systems: D10 Roll & Keep

Walking the Way: The Lost Spells of Rokugan is a 1998 role-playing game supplement for Legend of the Five Rings Roleplaying Game published by Alderac Entertainment Group.

== Contents ==
Walking the Way: The Lost Spells of Rokugan is a supplement in which more than fifty new spells are described.

== Reception ==
Walking the Way was reviewed in the online second version of Pyramid which said "For those who wish that there were more spells for the shugenja of the Legend of the Five Rings setting, AEG has heard you."
