= GM's Survival Guide =

GM's Survival Guide is a 1999 role-playing game supplement published by Alderac Entertainment Group for Legend of the Five Rings Roleplaying Game.

== Contents ==
GM's Survival Guide is a supplement in which help is provided for gamemasters to build their campaigns.

== Reviews ==
- Pyramid
- Backstab (as "Manuel de Survie du Maître")
