= War Chest =

2018 abstract strategy board game

- Designers: Trevor Benjamin, David Thompson
- Illustrators: Brigette Indelicato
- Publishers: Alderac Entertainment Group
- Publication: 2018
- Genres: Abstract strategy game, wargame, bag-building game
- Players: 2 or 4
- Chance: Medium (bag draw)
- Skills: Strategy, tactics, resource management

War Chest is an abstract strategy board game designed by Trevor Benjamin and David Thompson and published by Alderac Entertainment Group in 2018. It combines tactical movement and control of locations on a hexagonal board with a bag-building mechanism in which players draw weighted, poker-style unit coins from a bag. It is primarily designed as a two-player game, although it can also be played by four players in two teams.

Its sixteen unit types have different movement, attack and special abilities, while the composition of each player's bag determines which units can be activated during a round.

== Gameplay ==
War Chest is played on a compact hexagonal battlefield containing a number of control points. In the standard two-player game, each player commands four unit types selected from sixteen available units. The units may be assigned using suggested introductory armies, dealt randomly, or chosen through a draft. Each unit type has its own movement, attack or tactical ability, so the combination of four units available to a player substantially affects how an army operates.

Units are represented by heavy plastic coins similar to poker chips. At the beginning of a round, each player draws three coins from their bag. Players then alternate turns, normally spending one coin at a time. A unit coin can be used to deploy the corresponding unit to the board, bolster an existing unit of the same type, or activate that unit to move, attack or use a special ability. Coins may also be used face down for actions that do not depend on their unit type, including recruiting additional coins or attempting to secure initiative for the following round.

The same coins therefore function both as pieces on the battlefield and as an action resource. Deploying or bolstering a unit removes a coin from the player's bag, reducing the probability of drawing that unit's symbol later, while recruiting additional copies increases the likelihood that it can be activated in future rounds. Used coins enter a discard area and eventually return to the bag when it must be refilled. Some coins are played face down, preventing the opponent from knowing exactly which unit has been expended and creating an element of hidden information.

Combat is deterministic rather than dice-based. An attack normally removes one coin from an opposing unit; a unit consisting of only one coin is eliminated, while a bolstered stack can withstand additional attacks. Because a player generally needs to draw a matching coin before a unit can act, the result of the bag draw limits the actions available during a particular round. Players can nevertheless alter those probabilities through recruitment and by deciding which coins to commit to the board.

The objective is territorial rather than the destruction of the opposing army. Players compete to occupy and control designated locations on the board, placing control markers as they secure them. In a two-player game, the first player to place all six of their control markers wins. This encourages players to balance attacks against positional play and attempts to seize unprotected locations.

The four-player game is played by two teams of two. It uses a larger portion of the board and distributes unit types between teammates, who may openly discuss their plans. The fundamental system of drawing coins, activating units and competing for control locations remains the same.

== Development ==
Benjamin and Thompson developed War Chest from ideas explored in an earlier, more complex game design. Thompson has said that the lineage of the game can be traced to a platoon-level World War II deck-building design that the two worked on together. Benjamin proposed reducing that system to a substantially more streamlined abstract game and replacing deck-building with bag-building. The pair spent about a year iterating on the design and playtesting combinations of its asymmetric units.

Thompson separately described War Chest as an attempt to create an elegant game in both its rules and its physical presentation, while retaining ideas from a more complex deck-building game with a spatial element. The finished game uses a restrained visual design by Brigette Indelicato and relies on icons and differently patterned unit coins rather than miniatures. Reviewers frequently drew attention to the weight of the coins, the embroidered draw bags and the chest-like packaging as distinctive parts of its production.

== Expansions ==
The first expansion, War Chest: Nobility, was released in 2019. It introduced four additional units and a decree system that gives the Royal Coin an additional use. Three decrees are available during a game and can provide special actions outside the normal sequence of unit activation. Several of the new units interact directly with the decree mechanism.

War Chest: Siege followed in 2021. The expansion introduced fortifications, the first mechanism in the series to place defensive structures directly on the battlefield, together with four additional units. Fortifications can protect occupying units and influence control of locations, while new units such as the trebuchet, siege tower and war wagon are designed around attacking fortifications or altering the positioning of nearby forces. Some of their more powerful abilities require the unit to be bolstered before they can be used.

A third expansion, War Chest: Nightfall, appeared in 2024 and focused on disruption and subterfuge. It added four units alongside decoy coins and poison counters, allowing players to interfere with an opponent's bag or restrict the operation of units on the board. Thompson subsequently confirmed that he and Benjamin were working on another expansion, War Chest: Shock Tactics, for 2026.

== Reception ==
Matt Jarvis of Tabletop Gaming praised the way War Chest combined an abstract game's asymmetric pieces and deterministic combat with the uncertainty of drawing units from a bag. He found that the system allowed players to influence their chances by changing the composition of their bags, although he also noted that unfavorable draws and differences in player experience could sometimes cause games to become frustrating or slow in their later stages.

Mike Futter of SuperParent likewise compared its positional decision-making to chess, highlighting the interaction between hidden coins, unit-specific abilities and the optional drafting system. He regarded the game as straightforward to teach while retaining enough strategic depth for experienced players. Adam Factor of Sprites and Dice emphasized the relationship between tactical positioning and bag management, observing that placing a coin on the board or recruiting another copy changes the probability of activating that unit later. He also praised the weighted coins and other physical components, while criticizing the visibility of control markers underneath units and some aspects of the Royal Coin in the original design.

At the 2018 Dice Tower Awards, War Chest was nominated in the Best Two-Player Game category. It was also a runner-up for Best 2-Player Game in the 13th Annual Golden Geek Awards for games released in 2018.
