= Night of a Thousand Screams =

Night of a Thousand Screams is a 1998 role-playing game adventure published by Alderac Entertainment Group for Legend of the Five Rings Roleplaying Game.

== Plot summary ==
Night of a Thousand Screams is an adventure in which the player characters race to stop a murderous creature, recover a stolen artifact, thwart a cult's apocalyptic plot, and survive a cascade of intertwined crises during the Bon Festival.

== Reviews ==
- Backstab #11
- Realms of Fantasy
