= Warlord: Saga of the Storm CCG =

Collectible card game

Warlord: Saga of the Storm
- Card back for Warlord: Saga of the Storm
- Designers: Kevin Millard and David Williams
- Publishers: Alderac Entertainment Group
- Players: 2+
- Setup time: Less than a minute
- Playing time: Approx. 20 minutes
- Chance: High, due to use of 20 sided dice
- Skills: Card playing Arithmetic; Basic Reading Ability

Warlord: Saga of the Storm is a collectible card game designed by Kevin Millard and David Williams. It was produced by Alderac Entertainment Group since its introduction in April 2001 until January 2008, when they announced they were ceasing its production. In place of AEG, German company Phoenix Interactive has licensed the rights to produce the game and printed their first set, Fourth Edition, in July 2008. The longer official name is almost always shortened to Warlord and the subtitle "Saga of the Storm" is often used informally to refer to the original base set of cards. The game is unrelated to an earlier, similarly named CCG, Warlords.

Warlord is based on the Rank & File system which in turn borrows basic elements from the d20 system. Originally intended as an easy-to-learn second game for players already familiar with d20 fantasy role-playing games, Warlord is often marketed with the tagline, "The game you already know how to play". Warlord was permanently discontinued by AEG and Phoenix Interactive in early 2012, approximately one decade after its initial release.

== Introduction ==
Warlord differs from many other collectible/customizable card games in that, in gameplay, there is no specific "resource" required to bring cards into the playing field. In order to balance the gameplay, instead of separate "resources" being required, the game relies on its "Rank and File" system, using character level and location to determine whether items of a given level may be equipped, character level and class to determine whether a given action may be performed, and the number of "ranks" present in the player's formation to determine whether a given character can be brought in to play. Furthermore, characters themselves are often used as "resources" to perform certain actions in the game.

In 2002, Alderac Entertainment Group announced that "fans and industry professionals would design a set named Call to Arms of at least 300 cards to be released in February 2003. Among the people designing a card would be: the winners of Warlord tournaments at the 2002 Origins Game Fair and the 2002 Gen Con Game Fair; and the staff at InQuest Gamer magazine, which would include a copy of the card as a magazine insert in early 2003. The company also asked a number of "well-known industry personalities" to design a card, including Peter Adkison, Ryan Dancey, Tracy Hickman, and Margaret Weis. The company also offered a prize to the individual that submitted the greatest number of ideas to be printed on published cards.

Warlord's first reset was near the beginning of 2004, and was called Campaign Edition. The limited format was introduced in an attempt to bring more balance to the environment.

The next reset, called Epic Edition, was released in August 2006.

The card pool for Warlord currently has more than 2000 unique cards.

Warlord was officially discontinued by Alderac in mid-January, 2008 and ownership was transferred to Phoenix Interactive later that year.

Fourth Edition was released in late July 2008, followed by the first expansion for the new edition "Shattered Empires" in late 2008/ early 2009.

Early in 2023, it was revealed that the game would return, this time being developed and published by Kingswood Games with a kickstarter to raise money for the project set for a quarter four 2023 start date.

== Game play ==
In Warlord every player takes control of an army with the single objective of killing all the opposing leaders or Warlords. Once that is achieved, the game is won. The simplicity of Warlord comes from the fact that most everything is tested with a single d20 roll. Every check has a target number (TN) which defines how easy the task is to succeed. The player must surpass that TN with a single die roll plus any modifiers.

=== Terms ===
- Faction: All armies are aligned with one of the 7 factions. A Warlord's faction defines which characters they can use in their starting army, and is a guideline for which characters they are likely to use in their deck. Each faction has a different play style. The factions are Elf, Dwarf, Deverenian, Free Kingdoms, Nothrog, The Chosen, and Mercenary. Mercenaries have the unique characteristic of being able to be recruited in to any army. The Chosen were not introduced until the release of the 4th Edition.
- Warlord: The leader and most important character in a player's army. Each Warlord belongs to a faction, so once a Warlord is chosen, a deck is built around that warlord's abilities and faction. Barring a few exceptions, the game is lost if they die.
- Ranks: Warlord is based on a Rank & File system. That means that a player's army must follow some simple guidelines to stay in formation. This is created by building ranks.
- Order: An Order is also known as a Decree. Decrees happen during the Decree Phase. After initiative has been determined, the game play goes around the table, with each player giving one Decree at a time until all players pass. The player who won initiative gives one (and only one) Decree. When that decree is done, the player to the left gives a Decree, and so on. The Decree phase continues, with each player giving one Decree in turn, until all players pass consecutively. When this happens, the Decree phase ends. When it is a player's turn to give a Decree, they may do one of the following:

- Put a character into play from their hand.

- Have one of their characters perform an Order

- Pass

- React: Separate from Orders, Reacts are played in response to a particular occurrence within the game. Reacts will state when and under what conditions they can be played.
- Spend: Some Orders or Reacts require a card to be spent. To spend a card, turn it 90º so that it is horizontal to the player. When a card is turned sideways it is considered spent and "used up" for the turn. Spent cards cannot spend again. A card that is spent becomes ready at the beginning of the next turn.
- Stun: Sometimes a card is pushed beyond its limits, either by a player's own actions or by an opponent's. To stun a card, it is turned upside-down. Stunned cards cannot perform actions. A card that is stunned becomes spent at the beginning of the next turn, meaning it takes two full turns to "ready" a stunned character.
- Wounds: Wounds are a measure of the damage a character has suffered. Whenever a character is suffering a number of wounds equal to or greater than its hit points, it is removed from the playing area and placed in the discard pile.
- Trait: A bold faced word at the start of a text-box classifying a card as something specific (monster, paladin, etc.) or giving it an ability. Factions are specified as traits.

=== Types of cards ===
Warlord uses just four types of cards. Characters, Items, Dungeons and Actions.

Characters

Characters are the basic building blocks in Warlord. Their main function is to attack opponents and use the cards in hand and sometimes they may be used just as expendable fodder to slow opponents down. Players usually place the maximum number of characters allowed in their decks. Characters have a colored border depending on their faction and all five stat slots filled out.

Each character has some statistics which are based on D20 system's terms. Players of Dungeons & Dragons may find them familiar.

- Attack (ATK): How easily this character may hit with a melee strike and how many melee strikes he may perform.
- Armor Class (AC): How difficult it is for a melee or ranged strike to hit this character.
- Level: This is a generic rating of a card's power. Level start from 1 and have no upper limit, though there have been only a few cards that exceed level 9, most of which are related to a special tiered challenge system. Warlords are usually level 5 and cards over level 5 are usually reserved for very powerful characters like Dragons or Overlords.
- Alignment: Shows whether a character is good or evil (there is no neutral alignment). Alignment is only used as a restriction or target clause.
- Class: There are 4 main classes in Warlord: Fighter, Rogue, Wizard and Cleric. Each class has a specific symbol (Gauntlet, Glove, Scroll and Starburst, respectively) along with the simple circle of the classless characters. Classes are used to define what cards a character can use.
- Skill: This is a measure of a character's non-combat abilities. Skill is used to perform feats and succeed at saves and checks.
- Hit Points (HP): All characters have a damage threshold. Once a character has a number of wounds equal to or higher than their HP they are killed.

Additionally, all characters have a number of traits. The most basic is their Faction but many characters have more traits. The most common traits are:

- Feats: Feats are special skills the character is trained in (Stealth, Marksmanship). These are described in the rulebook.
- Subclass: Each class has 3 subclasses that are aligned to it. Characters possessing these subclasses gain access to more cards. Example subclasses are Necromancer, Ranger, and Seer. There are also two subclasses (Monk and Mentalist) that are common to all classes. "Subclass", as of the expansion Hero's Gambit, has become an official term of the game. Before it was just unofficially used by the fans of the game to refer to these types of traits.
- Unique: Most cards in Warlord allow for multiple copies in play. Players may only bring one copy of a card with the Unique trait into play.
- Epic: Warlord allows players to include up to three copies of most cards in their decks. A card with the Epic trait may only be included in a deck once.
- Planar: Planar characters can only be hit if the die roll is even. In Fourth Edition Planar replaced Astral and Ethereal. All characters or cards that give either of those traits now have or give Planar.

All characters in the later sets have some kind of ability. These abilities allow for a wide range of strategies, but some are very common.

- Ranged Strike: Ranged strikes are the second type of attack available in Warlord. Characters with the ranged strike ability can either attack from the safety of the second rank, or bypass the opponent's defense and strike in his more vulnerable second rank. Many Warlords, especially wizards, rely heavily on ranged strikes.
- Movement: Many characters, especially dragons, have some kind of movement ability. Due to the game's rank and file system, innate movement can be very helpful.
- Bonus Granting: Bonuses boost the stats of characters in a player's army in some way.
- Entering play effect: These characters have a once per game effect that activates as soon as they enter play. This kind of ability became mainstream with the Sneak Attack expansion.
- Leaving play effect: Leaving play effects activate as soon as the character dies. They become common with the Counter Attack expansion.

Items

These cards are used to enhance players' characters. As the game does not use a resource, items can only be equipped by characters with a sufficient level and rank. Items usually give some kind of stat boost but they are not restricted to just that. Items have a grey border.

Items always have a level and a class. The item's level is its relative power while the class restricts who can use it. Classless items can be used by anyone unless they have restrictions in their text box (such as a specific trait only). Items usually have the Attack or AC stat slots filled out with any bonus (or penalty) they may give.

Characters can equip any number of items with two exceptions: he cannot equip two copies of the same item and, when equipping an item with a trait, they must discard any items with the same trait. Traits on items classify them and define what kind of bonuses (if any) they will provide. That is, a Weapon is expected to grant an Attack bonus but AC bonuses, if any are given, will be low. These are the basic item traits:

- Weapon: These items usually provide an Attack bonus and usually some kind of offensive ability. Lately, Weapons that provide extra melee strikes have been made common for the fighter class.
- Shield: Shields provide low AC bonuses and some kind of defensive special ability. Original Shields had bug restrictions and as a result players just ignored them. Fortunately, Shields have been fixed in later sets. Shields are commonly combined with weapons to form Two-Handed Weapons. Due to this combination of traits, weapon-shields are usually more powerful.
- Armor: Armor gives an AC bonus and usually some kind of protective ability.
- Helmet: These items provide low AC bonuses and their abilities may vary depending on the class of the helmet.
- Steed: Steeds are the standard way to give movement to characters. Steeds are most common for the Fighter and Rogue classes.
- Gauntlet: This is a newer trait of items. Gauntlets may grant a stat bonus but it is not expected. Gauntlets usually grant abilities such as feats.
- Bow: Bows are usually used to provide ranged strikes to characters without the ability.
- Arrow: Arrows are only used during ranged strikes, enhancing their effect.
- Trap Traps are used in reaction mostly to targeting. Their effects usually, spend stun or wound the target of the trap. These are so far exclusive to the Rogue class.
- Stance: Stance is a new item trait. The only one so far is represents the Fighter class ability to make extra melee strikes.
- Potion Potion is a new item trait. The potion is a disposable item that gives bonuses and temporary use of a feat.

Actions

These represent the surprise element of the game. Most actions have restrictions on who may play them (by level and class or trait) which usually gives them focus. For example, fighter actions are usually enhancing reacts to melee strikes while wizard actions are destructive orders. Actions come in two types: Orders and Reacts. Order actions take an entire turn and usually have a more full effect. Reacts are played on specific triggers, such as attacking, moving, or equipping. Actions usually do not occupy a large percentage of the deck because they tend to clutter the hand. However, an action's power is usually greater than a comparable item's or character's because they are use and discard.

Dungeons

Introduced in the Temple of Lore expansion in late 2006, these cards represent various locations which have a global effect on the game. Dungeons are put into play as an order by any player. Each dungeon has a challenge rating. Any player can defeat a dungeon (discard it from play) by spending a number of character levels equal to or greater than the challenge rating of the dungeon. Dungeons typically have challenge ratings between 4 and 10. Dungeons did not return to Warlord in 4th Edition and remain a feature unique to Epic Edition.

== Deck construction ==
As in most CCGs, good deck construction is half the path to victory. Warlord has several restrictions on deck construction to ensure balance.

The deck

- must have a minimum of 50 cards (this includes the starting army).
- must have a Warlord and a legal starting army (usually) of the same faction as the Warlord.
- may have no more than 3 copies of a single card.
- may have no more than a single copy of an Epic card.
- may not be more than 50% cards of any one card type. (Character, Item, Action, or Dungeon). If the deck is 50 cards, that means it cannot have more than 25 Characters (of which 6 are the starting army).
- may not have more than one character with the Warlord, Overlord, Daemonlord or Dragon Lord trait, though it may have one of each.
