= The Tomb of Iuchiban =

- Publisher: Alderac Entertainment Group
- Publication date: 1998

The Tomb of Iuchiban is a 1998 role-playing game adventure published by Alderac Entertainment Group for Legend of the Five Rings Roleplaying Game.

== Plot summary ==
The Tomb of Iuchiban is an adventure in which a small band of samurai oppose a centuries-old dark magician Iuchiban.

== Reviews ==
- InQuest Gamer #49
- Backstab #14
- Casus Belli #118
