= City of Lies (disambiguation) =

City of Lies is a 2018 crime film directed by Brad Furman.

City of Lies may also refer to:

- City of Lies (Navai book), 2014 nonfiction book by Ramita Navai
- City of Lies (novel), 2018 young adult novel by Sam Hawke
- City of Lies (Legend of the Five Rings Roleplaying Game), a supplement for the role-playing game setting Legend of the Five Rings
