= Evil Unlimited =

Tabletop superhero role-playing game supplement for Brave New World

- Publishers: Alderac Entertainment Group
- Publication: 2001; 25 years ago
- Genres: Superhero fiction

Evil Unlimited is a 2001 role-playing game supplement published by Alderac Entertainment Group for Brave New World.

== Contents ==
Evil Unlimited is a supplement in which the criminal organization Evil Unlimited is detailed.

== Reviews ==
- Pyramid
- Backstab
