= Cat (role-playing game) =

2005 tabletop game

- Designers: John Wick
- Publishers: Wicked Dead
- Publication: 2005
- Genres: Modern fantasy
- Systems: Advantage System

Cat is an indie role-playing game by John Wick, in which players roleplay humanity's silent guardians: cats.

== Gameplay ==
The game's premise is that there are a great many invisible monsters called Boggins which "feed on children's fears and rejoice in men's shortcomings", and which would overcome us if not for the protection which Cats give to us. Cats cannot communicate with us except by travelling into the Kingdom of Dreams.

The game uses Wick's Advantage system. To perform actions, a player must roll enough successes with their dice pool. If they can find an advantage their character possesses (beyond high attributes) they can add dice to their dice pool. Cats are described using six attributes: Coat, Legs, Claws, Face, Fangs and Tail, which can take the values good (3 dice), strong (4 dice) or best (5 dice). Each cat has a reputation (for example, "rat-catcher"), points for style and scars, 3 names, and 9 lives.

== Publication history ==
Shannon Appelcline noted that with Wick working with Jared Sorensen, "Before Wicked Press collapsed under Wizard's Attic's weight, Wick had already started work on his first indie game, "Cat." Burnout and disillusionment kept him from completing that project for a couple of years, but then in 2003, Wick and Sorensen decided to try something new: they got into business together." Appelcline explained that for Wick at that time, his "plan was to release 'little games.' There were several more in 2004, including: two of Wick's Advantage games, Dragon: A Little Game for Little Dragons (2004) and Cat: A Little Game about Little Heroes (2004); Annie Rush's Alien Summit: A Little Game of Big Problems (2004) and The Secret Lives of Gingerbread Men (2004), the latter also an Advantage game; and a board game that was coauthored by the two called Necronomopoly (2004)."

Appelcline noted that "of all of Wicked Dead's 2004 games, Cat was the breakout. In it, the players take on the roles of cats — protecting their humans from dangers that they don’t even know about. The game had a fun premise, a simple setup, and used the proven (and evocative) Advantage System. The result was a book that Wick has sold year after year in both of his indie companies — while most of his other early games have fallen to the wayside." Appelcline continued, "Cat, it should be noted, was aimed at both grown-ups and kids, while Rush's The Secret Lives of Gingerbreadmen ("Little Cookies … Big Secrets") was advertised as a family game. Meanwhile, Dragon was intended for children. All told these three games comprised a rather impressive push toward a demographic that's ignored by most RPGs — even by most indie releases." Cat was later released in 2005 in one of the company's perfect-bound editions. Cat was one of Wick's older products that were later moved to use the John Wick Presents label. Cat was one of the revised versions of these older games to be republished in 2011.

== Reception ==
In the 2014 book Dragons in the Stacks: A Teen Librarian's Guide to Tabletop Role-Playing, Steven Torres-Roman liked character creation in Cat, which he called "very short and straightforward", but warned that "Cat gives more authorial control than do many conventional RPGs, and these can be challenging to run." He concluded by giving the game a rating of 2.5 out of 5, saying, "Cat lovers will enjoy this opportunity to play as their furry friends."

== Other reviews ==
- Pyramid
- Family Games: The 100 Best

== See also ==
- Bunnies and Burrows, the rabbit RPG
