= Straw (card game) =

Card game

- Designers: Richard James
- Illustrators: Octographics
- Publishers: Alderac Entertainment Group, Evertide Games
- Players: 2 to 6 players
- Setup time: <5 minutes
- Playing time: ~30 minutes
- Age range: 7 & up
- Skills: Hand Management

Straw (a.k.a. "Straw: The Game that Broke the Camel's Back") is an Arabian-nights-themed card game designed by Richard James (of Evertide Games) and published by Alderac Entertainment Group in 2008, with artwork by Octographics. The game is packaged with a rule book in English, French, German, Italian, and Spanish, but the cards themselves use numbers and symbols instead of just text.

Players draw from a common draw deck and maintain a hand of 4 cards representing items of varying weight. At a rate of 1 card per turn, players place cards onto the camel until the camel's back breaks from carrying too much weight, restoring a new card to their hand from the deck afterward. The person who breaks the camel's back scores 0 and all other players score the weight in their hand. Hand management is the key mechanic in this multi-round survival-style game.

== Releases ==
- Evertide Games Edition (2006)
- Alderac Entertainment Group Edition (2008)

== Reception ==
- Featured in a Full Frontal Nerdity webcomic (2007)
- Major Fun Award (2006)
- Video Review:
  - https://www.youtube.com/watch?v=y8Fhm7vbBU4
- Text Reviews:
  - Game Paradise: http://www.gameparadisestore.com/wordpress/?p=742
  - Drake's Flames: https://drakesflames.blogspot.com/2010/07/card-game-review-straw.html
  - Board Game Geek:
    - http://www.boardgamegeek.com/thread/644354/straw-great-filler-with-surprising-depth
    - http://www.boardgamegeek.com/thread/539766/family-review-straw-enjoy-breaking-the-camels-bac
    - http://www.boardgamegeek.com/thread/105571/straw-a-review-by-john-brader
