= Clan War =

1998 board game

Clan War is a 1998 board game published by Alderac Entertainment Group.

== Gameplay ==
Clan War is a game in which a miniatures game takes place in the fantasy setting of the Legend of the Five Rings.

== Reception ==
The online second version of Pyramid reviewed Clan War and commented that "Much like the Legend of the Five Rings collectible card and roleplaying games, Alderac Entertainment Group's Clan War, a miniatures combat game in the same setting, is almost Zen-like in its elegance and simplicity."

== Reviews ==
- Backstab #11
- Backstab #24
- The Comics Buyer's Guide
