= Scourge of the Howling Horde =

Dungeons & Dragons adventure module

- Rules required: D&D 3.5
- Character levels: 1st
- Campaign setting: Generic Setting
- Authors: Gwendolyn Kestrel
- First published: 2006

Scourge of the Howling Horde is a generic setting adventure module for the 3.5 edition of the Dungeons & Dragons roleplaying game. The adventure is designed for 1st level characters. It contains a 32-page adventure.

== Publication history ==
The book was published in 2006, and was written by Gwendolyn F.M. Kestrel, with cover art by Simone Bianchi and interior art by Carl Frank.
