= Evil (Alderac Entertainment Group) =

- Publisher: Alderac Entertainment Group)
- Publication date: 2001

Evil is a 2001 role-playing game supplement published by Alderac Entertainment Group.

== Contents ==
Evil is a supplement in which information is presented for designing challenging villains.

== Reviews ==
- Pyramid
- Backstab
- Polyhedron (Issue 148, Vol.21 No.5)
