= InSpectres =

Tabletop paranormal role-playing game by Jared Sorensen

- InSpectres (1st edition PDF) cover
- Designers: Jared A. Sorensen
- Publishers: Memento Mori Theatricks
- Publication: 2002
- Genres: Indie, Comedy, Horror
- Systems: Custom
- Website: http://www.memento-mori.com/pdf/inspectres

InSpectres is a humorous paranormal investigation-themed role-playing game created by Jared Sorensen and independently published in 2002 by Memento Mori Theatricks. The game's story line follows the player's work in a supernatural investigation and elimination company.

== Description ==
InSpectres is a humorous role-playing game about ghost-busting that allows players to invent their own clues. The game mechanics regulate the flow of clues to give the players time to develop their ideas and come up with an interesting story.

InSpectres uses an adversarial system, in which the player describes what happens if the dice roll is successful and the game master decides what happens if the dice roll is bad. Like most role playing games, the game has a method of conflict resolution using dice. If the player succeeds, they earn a "franchise die," and when enough are collected, the current case is solved. Players can, at any time, use "confessionals," in the style of reality television, to add traits to other players' characters or steer events their way.

=== Setting ===
The player characters have just started a franchise in the supernatural investigation and elimination business InSpectres. They investigate paranormal phenomena, hunt ghosts and kill vampires, depending on their company's niche.

== Publication history ==
InSpectres was designed by Jared A. Sorensen and published by Memento Mori Theatricks in 2002.

=== Supplements ===
Three pdf supplements (termed 'micro-supplements') provide alternative settings. All three micro supplements are available for free download:

- InSpeckers: A series of adventures where grade-schoolers across the country fight the forces of darkness in their homes, schools and neighborhoods.
- UnSpeakable: Using a 1920s setting, weird tales of horror, madness and woe in the vein of H.P. Lovecraft. Rather than agents working out of a company, the characters are people who have been called together to investigate the unknown.
- InSpace: Explores the mysteries of space.

== Reception ==
In his 2023 book Monsters, Aliens, and Holes in the Ground, RPG historian Stu Horvath noted the parallels between this game and Ghostbusters, but commented, "Despite that clear influence, both games play radically different from each other — a testament to how new indie design was in execution, despite emerging from similar sources."

== Legacy ==
- Jay Little listed InSpectres as one of several narrative driven games that influenced his work as designer of the third edition of Warhammer Fantasy Roleplay (2009).
- InSpectres inspired a feature-length film from Reactor 88 Studios. The official release date was September 6, 2013, with the film premiering at an initial theatrical release by Muvico in Rosemont, Illinois and in December at CineFamily in Los Angeles.
