= Waves of Blood =

Waves of Blood is a 2001 role-playing game supplement published by Alderac Entertainment Group for 7th Sea.

== Contents ==
Waves of Blood is a supplement in which Théah’s perilous seas are explored, combining naval faction histories, storyline lore, new rules, major NPCs, artifacts, locations, and maritime mysteries—including the Black Freighters—into a single maritime guide.

== Reviews ==
- Backstab #34
- Realms of Fantasy
