= Ghost Dog: The Way of the Samurai (role-playing game) =

Tabletop role-playing game

Ghost Dog: The Way of the Samurai is a role-playing game published by Guardians of Order in 2000.

== Description ==
Ghost Dog: The Way of the Samurai is based on the film Ghost Dog: The Way of the Samurai, and uses the Tri-Stat System.

== Publication history ==
Ghost Dog: The Way of the Samurai was published by Guardians of Order in 2000.

David L. Pulver and John R. Phythyon, Jr., designed the gangster Samurai Tri-stat game Ghost Dog (2000) based on the film of the same name.

== Reviews ==
- Pyramid
- Backstab #24
