= Good (Alderac Entertainment Group) =

Good is a 2002 role-playing game supplement published by Alderac Entertainment Group.

== Contents ==
Good is a supplement in which new options are presented for good-aligned characters.

== Reviews ==
- Pyramid
- Backstab
