= Rokugan Oriental Adventures Campaign Setting =

Rokugan Oriental Adventures Campaign Setting is a 2001 role-playing game supplement published by Alderac Entertainment Group.

== Contents ==
Rokugan Oriental Adventures Campaign Setting is a supplement in which the land of Rokugan is detailed.

== Publication history ==
Shannon Appelcline noted after AEG got the rights back to L5R, "Showing remarkable coordination, they immediately began supplementing Wizards' Oriental Adventures. Their first release, the Rokugan Oriental Adventures Campaign Setting (2001) - which expanded upon Wizards' sourcebook and in some places superseded it - came out just two months after Oriental Adventures, in December, 2001."

== Reviews ==
- Pyramid
- Backstab
- Backstab #43
