= City of Lies (Legend of the Five Rings Roleplaying Game) =

City of Lies is a 1998 role-playing game supplement published by Alderac Entertainment Group for Legend of the Five Rings Roleplaying Game.

== Contents ==
City of Lies is a supplement in which Ryoko Owari is presented—Rokugan's elegant, opium‑filled cesspit of intrigue—as a campaign setting packed with locations, secrets, and magistrate‑focused adventures steeped in Scorpion Clan corruption.

== Reviews ==
- Backstab #10
- Realms of Fantasy
- InQuest #40
- Casus Belli #115
