= Dungeons (Alderac Entertainment Group) =

Dungeons is a 2001 role-playing game supplement published by Alderac Entertainment Group.

== Contents ==
Dungeons is a supplement in which dungeons and catacombs are detailed.

== Reviews ==
- Pyramid
- Backstab
- Gaming Frontiers (Volume 1 - 2002)
