= Ussura =

Ussura is a 2001 role-playing game supplement published by Alderac Entertainment Group for 7th Sea.

== Contents ==
Ussura is a supplement in which a detailed nation of primal wilderness, ancient magic, and defiant culture is presented, offering its history, peoples, faith, secrets, and new rules for Ussuran heroes—including Pyeryem shapeshifting, unique skills, and Fhideli lore.

== Reviews ==
- Backstab #32
- Realms of Fantasy
