= Brave New World (role-playing game) =

Tabletop role-playing game

- Designers: Matt Forbeck
- Publishers: Pinnacle Entertainment Group (1999); Alderac Entertainment Group (2000)
- Publication: 1999; 27 years ago
- Genres: Superhero fiction
- Systems: Custom

Brave New World is a role-playing game originally released by Pinnacle Entertainment Group in 1999. The game was sold to Alderac Entertainment Group in 2000. The game is an alternate history superhero game set in a neo-fascist United States living in a perpetual state of martial law since 1963. Inspired by the Kingdom Come and Batman: The Dark Knight Returns comic storylines, X-Men, Nineteen Eighty-Four, and the political and social upheavals of the 1990s, the game depicts renegade superheroes fighting a corrupt and evil government.

== Publishing history ==
Written by Matt Forbeck, Brave New World debuted at Gen Con in 1999 in Milwaukee.. Ravaged Planet: The Brave New World Player's Guide, and Defiants were also published in 1999. Forbeck left Pinnacle Entertainment Group to move to Alderac Entertainment Group just before the two companies ended their relationship, and sold his Brave New World role-playing game to AEG. In early 2001, when AEG cancelled the line. In 2009, AEG released all of the Brave New World books in PDF format through DriveThruRPG.

== Game system ==
The game system is based on a simplified version of Deadlands, without playing cards or poker chips, and only using six-sided dice. Superpowers were represented as specific "power packages" of thematic powers grouped together, such as "flyer", "speedster" or "blaster" (similar systems of archetypes are found in other superhero games, like City of Heroes).

== Setting ==
The Brave New World books always were intentionally vague about some parts of the setting, implying that there were mysteries that the general public (and player characters) would not know about. The truth to these elements was revealed in the "Guide's Handbook" part of each book. Elements of the setting that were planned, but never published, were revealed on the author's web site in 2004, providing a much clearer picture of the Brave New World setting.

The most important secret was that President Kennedy was dead. He really was killed by assassins in 1963. The man who calls himself John F. Kennedy is actually "Facade", an Alpha shapeshifter who Superior convinced to temporarily impersonate the President to allow for a more orderly transfer of office. Facade was not about to give up the most powerful office in the world so lightly, though.

Famous Defiance martyr "Patriot", supposedly executed by the government, was secretly rescued by the Defiance and living in hiding, with the Defiance unwilling to reveal he was alive and lose a powerful martyr, and the government being unwilling to admit that one of their biggest enemies was forcibly rescued from New Alcatraz.

The reason that the USSR did not fall and that coups have failed is that the Premier is a Delta himself, with superhuman healing as his power. Whenever he is poisoned or shot, he recovers within moments. China actually does have as many Deltas as other nations, but it keeps their existence a closely guarded secret, preserving an illusion of scarcity.

Alphas and Deltas got their power from being descended from extra-dimensional entities. In other universes, the laws of physics were different, allowing beings to fly, or shoot beams of energy, or be incredibly strong. When they traveled from universe to universe, they were sometimes mistaken for gods, like they were on Earth. They interbred with the native humans, before being chased away by mysterious "multiversal police" who were an order of being far more powerful, "Omegas", who were as far above Alphas as Alphas were from Deltas. The Multiversal police considered it a serious crime to visit universes that did not natively have superpowers, as it seriously damages the fabric of reality to use superpowers in a world that isn't able to support them.

Thus, the gods and monsters of legend and the angels and devils of religions were real, and are not around anymore because they were chased away by other powerful beings. However, most of mankind is descended, however distantly, from at least one of these beings. Most humans have the raw genetic potential to be Deltas and Alphas, but never get the chance. Only the greatest stress could trigger the subconscious to actually use Delta powers, and the same stresses could turn a Delta into an Alpha. While Delta powers were not natural to Earth, their use was not very injurious to the universe. However, mighty Alpha powers were beginning to slowly destroy the world. If something was not done, the world would be destroyed fairly soon.

The Multiversal Police returned to Earth, and spoke with Facade (impersonating President Kennedy), explaining the real nature of their powers and the danger their world was in, and they made a deal with him. They provided Facade with a device which would eliminate most of the Alphas and prevent Earth's entire universe from collapsing. This device was handed over to Devastator, being told it was a doomsday bomb, which he activated during the Bicentennial Battle.

At the moment the bomb was activated, every Alpha on Earth who was not specially protected (such as being in a special prison) was teleported to a specially prepared pocket dimension, along with everything within 25 miles (40 km) of the bomb (the Chicago metropolitan area). Thus, the entire city of Chicago, along with almost all the Alphas on Earth, was imprisoned in a pocket universe, seemingly forever. It was intended for Superior, aided by a quarter century of work by every Alpha formerly on Earth, to escape, and for the truth about Facade, the Multiversal Police, the source of Delta powers to be revealed, and for heroes from Earth to be able to explore other universes, but that book, "Crossroads", never got to be published.

== Reviews ==
- Pyramid
- Casus Belli #122

== See also ==
- Evil Unlimited – Tabletop superhero role-playing game supplement for Brave New World
