= Hero Builder's Guidebook =

2000 role-playing game accessory

- Hero Builder's Guidebook book cover
- Author: Ryan Dancey, David Noonan, and John D. Rateliff
- Genre: Role-playing games
- Publisher: Wizards of the Coast
- Publication date: December 2000
- Media type: Book
- Pages: 64
- ISBN: 978-0-7869-1647-4

Hero Builder's Guidebook is an accessory for the 3rd edition of the Dungeons & Dragons fantasy role-playing game.

== Contents ==
Hero Builder's Guidebook provides assistance to help develop player characters for 3rd edition Dungeons & Dragons.

== Publication history ==
Hero Builder's Guidebook was published in December 2000, and was designed by Ryan Dancey, David Noonan, and John D. Rateliff. Cover art was by Brom, with interior art by Dennis Cramer.

== Reception ==
The reviewer from Pyramid noted that the Hero Builder's Guidebook "is a companion to the 3rd Edition D&D Player's Handbook, and that alone set my teeth a little on edge when I first took a look at it", concerned that Wizards of the Coast may release too many "indispensable" books rather than allowing the game to stand alone.

== Reviews ==
- Backstab #27
