= Orkworld =

Tabletop fantasy role-playing game by John Wick

- Orkworld rulebook cover
- Designers: John Wick
- Publishers: Wicked Press
- Publication: 2000
- Genres: Tabletop role-playing game, fantasy

Orkworld is a fantasy role-playing game featuring orks. It was designed by John Wick, illustrated by Thomas Denmark and released by Wicked Press.

== Game setting and mechanics ==
According to Wick, Orkworld breaks from the mold of treating orks as evil monsters in tabletop role-playing games and fantasy literature dating back to their creation by J. R. R. Tolkien. Orkworld treats orks as protagonists (although not necessarily heroic ones), doomed by the fact that they are less intelligent and adaptable than their enemy races of humanity, dwarf-kind and elvenfolk. The game is heavily descriptive of a fantastical orkish culture.

Orkworld is also unusual in that character generation is a collective effort. Each party of players first creates the household using a pool of character points. The household defines multiple aspects of the group. The points spent can define the technological level, the population, the experience of the household leaders, and even the resources and strongholds available to the household. Once this is complete the players then divide up the remaining character points however they want and use the points assigned to each of them to create their character for the game.

== Fan reaction ==
While fan reaction was mixed, a number of fan created additions to the game engine were done and released on the net during the years following release, and some are still recorded in the WaybackMachine internet archive.

== Reviews ==
- Pyramid
- Backstab #24
