= John Zinser (game designer) =

American game designer

- Occupation: Game designer

John Zinser is an American game designer who has worked primarily on collectible card games and role-playing games.

== Career ==
Jolly Blackburn added John Zinser and David Seay as partners in Alderac Entertainment Group in 1992. Zinser was developing an original collectible card game in 1994, which began as an idea from a conversation between Zinser and Seay discussing the 1980 role-playing game Bushido, and was ultimately published as Legend of the Five Rings. Blackburn left Alderac in 1995 because he felt that Zinser and Seay were looking for success in the CCG industry while he wanted to keep the company fun and small and focus on Knights of the Dinner Table. According to Zinser, he wanted the in debt company to grow at a faster pace than Blackburn was comfortable with. so, a split was agreed upon, with Blackburn leaving with the rights to Knights of the Dinner Table and some other properties. Five Rings Publishing Group was formed in 1996, with Robert Abramowitz as the President, Ryan Dancey as VP of Product Development, and Zinser as VP of Sales. Zinser was credited as having provided advice on Deadlands: Hell on Earth (1998) from Pinnacle Entertainment Group.
