= Memento Mori Theatricks =

Role-playing game publisher

Memento Mori Theatricks is an American game company that produces role-playing games and game supplements.

== History ==
Jared Sorensen first expanded his ideas for a live action role-playing game into his first rule set available to the public, the Memento Mori Theatricks (1996) LARP for Vampire: The Masquerade. Sorensen registered memento-mori.com on March 26, 1998 initially to serve as the home for the game Pulp Era (1998), which he designed with James Carpio and Jon Richardson, and about two years later he would start to use the site to host the majority of his games and ideas for games. Sorensen had added roughly 20 games and game ideas to the Memento Mori website by 2001, although many of them were unfinished and unplayable. Sorensen produced Schism in July 2001 to be the first of five "mini-supplements" that would publish for Sorcerer, and as his first commercial book he initially made the 36-page black & white PDF available on his Memento Mori website. Sorensen moved toward making Memento Mori a professional publisher by late 2001, and focused on three completed games by releasing commercial PDFs of InSpectres (2002), the Mad Max-influenced game octaNe (2002), and the b-horror movie game Squeam (2002), and along with Schism, they became the foundation to make a commercial enterprise out of Memento Mori. For the next two years, Memento Mori sold PDFs using the indie field innovator Forge Bookshelf. Memento Mori also began to publish PDFs by other authors, including Against the Reich! (2003) by Paul Elliott (an expansion for octaNe), and Le Mon Mouri (2003) by Sean Demory. Sorensen paused role-playing game production through Memento Mori as he redirected his creative energy to development work for Dungeons & Dragons Online (2006) and The Lord of the Rings Online (2007).
