= Gnome Stew =

Multi-author blog on role-playing games

- Industry: tabletop role-playing game
- Website: https://gnomestew.com/

Gnome Stew is a multi-author blog about tabletop role-playing games that won ENNIE Awards every year between 2010 and 2018, with seven "Best Blog" and three "Best Website" awards. Its main audiences are game design professionals and recreational gamemasters. Gnome Stew was praised for its usefulness by Monte Cook, who said he read the website every day.

== List of ENNIE Awards ==
- 2010: Best Blog (Silver)
- 2011: Best Blog (Silver)
- 2012: Best Blog (Gold)
- 2013: Best Blog (Gold), Best Website (Gold)
- 2014: Best Blog (Gold)
- 2015: Best Blog (Silver)
- 2016: Best Website (Gold)
- 2017: Best Website (Gold)
- 2018: Best Blog (Gold)

In 2019, the "Best Blog" and "Best Website" categories were retired from the awards and replaced with "Best Online Content."
