= Ryan Dancey =

American game designer and executive

- Occupation: Game designer

Ryan S. Dancey is a businessman who has worked primarily in the collectible card game and role-playing game industries. He was vice president in charge of Dungeons & Dragons at Wizards of the Coast.

When the publisher of Dungeons & Dragons was facing bankruptcy, Dancey helped negotiate sale of the property to Wizards of the Coast.

Dancey promoted the D&D's open gaming license (OGL), which reversed the policy from opposing third-party publications to supporting them.

== Career ==
Dancey was the owner of the distributor Isomedia Inc, a company that was helping fund the collectible card game Legend of the Five Rings (1995), and Dancey joined in on the project. The principals behind the game created the new company Five Rings Publishing Group in 1996 with better funding from Robert Abramowitz as its President; Alderac Entertainment Group (AEG) and Isomedia gave over their rights to Legend of the Five Rings, with Dancey becoming Vice President of Product Development and John Zinser of AEG becoming VP of Sales.

TSR was approaching bankruptcy in early 1997 and in need of a buyer; Abramowitz and Dancey negotiated a deal to purchase TSR, which they brought to Peter Adkison of Wizards of the Coast, who purchased Five Rings Publishing along with TSR. At the end of the next year the Five Rings Publishing Group was dissolved, and Dancey took over as business head of the Wizards of the Coast role-playing department, where he became involved in the development of Dungeons & Dragons third edition. Adkison put Dancey in charge of business and marketing for TSR. Dancey championed Wizards of the Coast purchasing Last Unicorn Games in 2000, to obtain their efficient R&D team for the existing RPG staff at Wizards. Dancey largely conceived of the Open Gaming License (OGL) and d20 System Trademark License, based on his belief that the true strength of D&D came from its community of gamers. He said that TSR was far too aggressive looking for copyright violations and alienated fans. The OGL was published by WOTC in 2000 to license the System Reference Document (SRD) for D&D in a move spearheaded by Dancey. Dancey also co-authored the Hero Builder's Guidebook (2000). Dancey later moved to being a consultant, and was among those employees Wizards laid off before the end of 2002.

Dancey later worked for Icelandic video game producer CCP Games, which had purchased White Wolf Publishing.

In 2011, Dancey began working on Goblinworks "Pathfinder Online" Sandbox MMORPG. In August 2015, interim Goblinworks CEO Lisa Stevens announced that Ryan Dancey had left Goblinworks for personal reasons. In a separate letter to players, she indicated that Dancey was still involved, and would continue to consult on the project.

In 2026, Dancey went viral for claiming that AI could replace game designers. The next day, he was terminated from AEG.
