= Legend of the Five Rings Roleplaying Game =

1997 Tabletop fantasy role-playing game

Legend of the Five Rings
Roleplaying in the Emerald Empire
- Cover of the first edition by Matt Wilson
- Designers: Brian Yoon; Fred Wan; John Wick; Rich Wulf; Seth Mason; Shawn Carman; Rob Hobart
- Publishers: Alderac Entertainment Group
- Publication: 1997 (1st edition); 2000 (2nd edition); 2005 (3rd edition); 2010 (4th edition); 2018 (Fantasy Flight Games)
- Genres: Fantasy
- Systems: Roll & Keep
- Website: www.legendofthefiverings.com

The Legend of the Five Rings Roleplaying Game is a role-playing game originally written by John Wick and published by Alderac Entertainment Group, under license from Five Rings Publishing Group, in 1997. The game uses the Legend of the Five Rings setting, primarily the nation of Rokugan, which is based on feudal Japan with influences from other East Asian cultures.

Like most role-playing games, Legend of the Five Rings is played by one or more players and a game master, who controls the events that happen during the game as well as the non-player characters (NPCs). Legend of the Five Rings features many courtiers and other non-combatant character types as valid player characters.

In September 2015, AEG and Fantasy Flight Games (FFG) jointly announced that the intellectual property had been sold to FFG. Fantasy Flight Games released a new role-playing game based on the Legend of the Five Rings setting in October 2018. In 2020, FFG's parent company Asmodee transferred FFG's RPG lines, including Legend of the Five Rings, to another subsidiary, Edge Studio.

== Setting ==
The fictional setting of Legend of the Five Rings is similar to feudal Japan, though it also includes aspects of other Asian cultures, as well as magic and mythical beasts. There is no given name for the entire world which the setting describes, so "Rokugan" is used alternately to refer to the specific nation within the setting or to refer to the entire world.

Rokugani society is based on a clan structure, with seven (and later eight) so-called "Great Clans", as well as a number of minor clans. Great Clans are made up of several family lines, each with their own general purpose within the clan. Minor clans generally only have one family. Each clan also has areas of land bequeathed by the emperor under their control. The emperor retains ownership of all lands, however, and the clans essentially rent the lands by paying annual taxes.

== System ==
The game system of Legend of the Five Rings uses 10-sided dice exclusively. Usually, when a die is rolled and the result is 10 (normally marked '0' on the die), the die is said to "explode". In this situation, the player rolls again and the new result is added to the original result. If this second result is a 10, the player rolls a third time, totaling all three results. This process is repeated until the player rolls something other than 10. The second edition and most books made for it were written to work both with this system and with D20 rules as presented in the Oriental Adventures D&D setting; this was discontinued after third edition was published.

=== Roll & Keep ===
The mechanic for which the game is most widely known is the "Roll & Keep" system, designed by Dave Williams and John Wick. When dice are rolled, there are two quantities given: a number of dice to be rolled and a number of dice to be "kept". The totals of the kept dice are added together, giving the player the total sum for his or her roll. For example, if a roll called for five dice to be rolled and three kept (said simply "five keep three" or written "5k3"), five dice would be rolled. Out of those five, the player would choose three (generally, but not necessarily, the player would choose the three with the highest values) whose values would be added together for the total value of the roll.

=== Rings ===
Legend of the Five Rings uses eight traits: Stamina, Willpower, Strength, Perception, Agility, Intelligence, Reflexes, and Awareness. The Traits are grouped into pairs associated with four elemental "Rings" (respectively to above): Earth, Water, Fire and Air. The four Rings represent a limitation in character development, because in order for a character to advance, the level of his Rings must increase, and to increase a character's Rings, both of the Ring's associated Traits must increase.

There is a fifth Ring, called Void. This ring, like the other four, is taken from Miyamoto Musashi's The Book of Five Rings. In the game, Void represents a character's inner strength, and its use allows a character to perform extraordinary actions, or to perform normal actions more efficiently.

=== Character creation ===
There are primarily two methods of creating characters in role-playing games: to roll dice to randomly generate attributes or to begin with a set number of points and a formula by which attributes can be purchased with these points. Legend of the Five Rings uses the latter method. Each new character begins with 40 "Character Points" to spend to create the character (except for ronin characters, which begin with 55). These points are spent to raise the level of the character's Traits and Void Ring, to raise the level of the character's skills, and to purchase new skills. In previous versions of the game, characters started with 30 points, or 45 for ronin.

These points may also be used to purchase Advantages, which give the character some extra bonus or ability that is designed to help in certain situations (such as "Large", which increases the damage a character can inflict, or "Social Position", which increases that character's standing in the courts of the land). Conversely, if a player so chooses, he can select a number of Disadvantages for his character, which give extra Character Points to spend in other areas, but imposes some penalty on the character during play (such as "Small", which decreases the damage the character can inflict with certain weapons, or "Bad Reputation", which causes a great number of NPCs to dislike the character).

As of fifth edition, characters are created using a 20 question system, with each question determining skill, social, and ring stats.

=== Lethality ===
The Legend of the Five Rings Role-Playing Game is renowned for its lethality. Players who charge into combat unaware will often find their characters killed in the first session. Proper role-playing is encouraged to avoid combat when unnecessary, but the characters do have requisite abilities to survive if combat is forced in the early stages.

== Oriental Adventures ==
Oriental Adventures was published originally in 1985 by TSR, Inc. as an expansion for Advanced Dungeons & Dragons and was set in a land called Kara-Tur. In 2001, Wizards of the Coast released a new edition of Oriental Adventures as an expansion for the third edition of Dungeons & Dragons. It was decided to make this new version of Oriental Adventures a showcase for their recently acquired Legend of the Five Rings property. An official (but not 100% comprehensive) update of Oriental Adventures to the v.3.5 rules can be found in Dragon Magazine #318 (April 2004), pp. 32–48.

For the entirety of its Second Edition, with the exception of the Player's Guide, Game Master's Guide, Way of the Shadowlands, Winter Court: Kyuden Asako, and Time of the Void, books published for the Legend of the Five Rings RPG had two different sets of game mechanics: the mechanics from the Legend of the Five Rings Second Edition Player's Guide and corresponding mechanics for d20 System, such as those presented in Oriental Adventures. Beginning with the Third Edition of the Legend of the Five Rings Role-Playing Game, and because of the lack of availability of the now out of print Oriental Adventures, the d20 System rules have been dropped from current Legend of the Five Rings Role-Playing Game books.

== Books ==
Listed by AEG reference number in parentheses followed by title

=== First Edition (AEG) ===
- (3001) Legend of the Five Rings – Roleplaying in the Emerald Empire (first edition core rule book)
- (3002) Game Master's Pack: The Hare Clan
- (3003) The Way of the Dragon (Way of the Clans: Book One), June 1997
- (3004) City of Lies box set (L-1 City of Lies)
- (3005) The Way of the Unicorn (Way of the Clans: Book Two)
- (3006) Book of the Shadowlands
- (3007) The Way of the Crab (Way of the Clans: Book Three)
- (3008) The Way of the Scorpion (Way of the Clans: Book Five)
- (3009) The Way of the Crane (Way of the Clans: Book Four)
- (3010) The Way of the Lion (Way of the Clans: Book Six)
- (3011) Walking the Way: The Lost Spells of Rokugan
- (3012) The Tomb of Iuchiban box set (S-1 Shadowlands Series), January 1999
- (3013) Way of Shadow
- (3014) The Way of the Naga (Way of the Clans: Book Eight)
- (3015) Game Master's Survival Guide
- (3016) Winter Court: Kyuden Seppun
- (3017) The Way of the Phoenix (Way of the Clans: Book Seven)
- (3018) Unexpected Allies
- (3019) Bearers of Jade: The Second Book of the Shadowlands
- (3020) Otosan Uchi: The Imperial City box set (O-1 The Imperial City)
- (3021) The Way of the Minor Clans (Way of the Clans: Book Nine)
- (3022) Game Master's Pack (Revised): The Silence Within Sound
- (3023) Merchant's Guide to Rokugan
- (3024) Winter Court: Kyuden Kakita
- (3025) The Way of the Wolf (Way of the Clans: Book Ten)
- (3028) The Way of Shinsei(Way of the Clans: Book Eleven)
- (4001) Honor's Veil (I-1 Intrigue Series)
- (4002) Night of a Thousand Screams (L-2 City of Lies)
- (4003) Code of Bushido (B-1 Bushido Series)
- (4004) Twilight Honor (S-2 Shadowlands Series)
- (4005) Midnight's Blood (M-1 High Magic Series)
- (4006) Legacy of the Forge (B-2 Bushido Series)
- (4007) Void in the Heavens (M-2 High Magic Series)
- (4008) Lesser of Two Evils (S-3 Shadowlands Series)
- (4500) Character Travelogue: Crab
- (4501) Character Travelogue: Crane
- (4502) Character Travelogue: Dragon
- (4503) Character Travelogue: Lion
- (4504) Character Travelogue: Phoenix
- (4505) Character Travelogue: Ronin
- (4506) Character Travelogue: Scorpion
- (4507) Character Travelogue: Unicorn

=== Second Edition (AEG) ===
- (3101) Legend of the Five Rings – Player's Guide (second edition core rules)
- (3102) Legend of the Five Rings – Game Master's Guide (second edition core rules)
- (3030) Way of the Shadowlands *
- (3030) Winter Court: Kyuden Asako *(both marked 3030, there is no 3031)
- (3032) Way of the Ratling
- (3033) Time of the Void
- (4009) Bells of the Dead
- (4010) Mimura: The Village of Promises

(d20 System) (Oriental Adventures)

- (3103) Rokugan – Oriental Adventures Campaign Setting (d20 System)
- (3104) Creatures of Rokugan (d20 System)
- (3105) Magic of Rokugan (d20 System)
- (3106) Way of the Samurai (d20 System)
- (3107) Way of the Ninja (d20 System)
- (3108) Way of the Shugenja (d20 System)
- (3109) Fortunes & Winds (second edition/d20 System)
- (3026) Secrets of the Lion (second edition/d20 System)
- (3027) Secrets of the Scorpion (second edition/d20 System)
- (3029) Secrets of the Unicorn (second edition/d20 System)
- (3034) Secrets of the Mantis (second edition/d20 System)
- (3035) Secrets of the Phoenix (second edition/d20 System)
- (3036) Secrets of the Crab (second edition/d20 System)
- (3037) Secrets of the Crane (second edition/d20 System)
- (3038) Secrets of the Dragon (second edition/d20 System)
- (3039) Secrets of the Shadowlands (second edition/d20 System)
- (3041) Legend of the Five Rings Live-Action Roleplaying (d20 System)
- (3042) Way of the Open Hand (d20 System)
- (3043) Way of the Daimyo (d20 System)
- (3044) Way of the Thief (d20 System)
- (3046) Complete Exotic Arms Guide (d20 System)
- (3047) The Hidden Emperor (d20 System)

==== Non-AEG second edition compatible books ====
- (WTC 12015) Oriental Adventures (d20 System)
- (PCI 2101) Bloodspeakers (d20 System)

=== Third Edition (AEG) ===
- (3200) Legend of the Five Rings Roleplaying Game Third Edition
- (3200) Legend of the Five Rings Roleplaying Game Third Edition Revised
- (3201) The Four Winds: The Toturi Dynasty from Gold to Lotus
- (3202) Creatures of Rokugan
- (3203) Art of the Duel
- (3204) Emerald Empire: The Legend of the Five Rings Companion
- (3205) Masters of War
- (3206) Prayers and Treasures
- (3207) Masters of Court
- (3208) Legend of the Burning Sands Roleplaying Game
- (3209) Masters of Magic
- (3210) Fealty and Freedom
- (3211) The Vacant Throne

=== Fourth Edition (AEG) ===
- (3300) Legend of the Five Rings – fourth edition (core rules)
- (3301) Legacy of Disaster
- (3302) Game Master's Screen and Adventure (Descent into Darkness)
- (3303) Strongholds of the Empire
- (3304) Enemies of the Empire
- (3305) Emerald Empire
- (3306) The Great Clans
- (3307) Imperial Histories
- (3308) The Book of Air
- (3309) Second City box set
- (3310) The Book of Earth
- (3311) Imperial Histories 2
- (3312) The Book of Fire
- (3313) Naishou Province
- (3314) Secrets of the Empire
- (3315) The Book of Water
- (3316) Sword and Fan
- (3317) The Book of Void
- (3318) Atlas of Rokugan
- Unexpected Allies 2 (pdf and print-on-demand)
- The Imperial Archives (pdf and print-on-demand)

=== Fifth Edition (Edge Studio) ===
- Beginner Game with The Topaz Championship (adventure, completed by In The Palace of the Emerald Champion adventure and 3 more pre-generated characters, pdf)
- Core Rulebook
- Game Master's Kit with Dark Tides (adventure, completed by The Mantis Clan sourcebook, pdf)
- Emerald Empire (sourcebook)
- Wedding At Kyotei Castle (2018 Gen Con adventure, pdf)
- Shadowlands (sourcebook)
- Mask of the Oni (adventure, completed by The Knotted Tails supplemental storyline, pdf)
- Courts of Stone (sourcebook)
- Winter's Embrace (adventure, completed by The Scroll or the Blade supplemental adventure, pdf)
- Path of Waves (sourcebook)
- Sins of Regret (adventure, completed by Cresting Waves supplemental encounters, pdf)
- The Highwayman (2019 Gen Con adventure, pdf)
- Celestial Realms (sourcebook)
- Wheel of Judgement (adventure, completed by Deathly Turns supplemental encounters, pdf)
- Fields of Victory (sourcebook)
- Blood of the Lioness (adventure, completed by "Legacies of War" supplemental content, pdf)
- Writ of the Wilds (sourcebook)
- Imperfect Land (adventure, pdf only)
- Children of the Five Winds (sourcebook)

=== Adventures in Rokugan (Edge Studio) ===
- Adventures in Rokugan (Core Rulebook)
- Game Master's Kit (GM Screen & Sins of Succession Adventure)
- Storm Eel's Rest (2023 FreeRPG Day Adventure)
- Tomb of Iuchiban (Campaign Sourcebook)

== Reception ==
The reviewer from the online second volume of Pyramid stated that "I have a great deal of nostalgia for FGU's classic game Bushido, and Legend of the Five Rings captures much of Bushido's Oriental swords & sorcery feel, with, thankfully, much more comprehensible rules."

In 1998, Legend of the Five Rings won the Origins Award for Best Roleplaying Game of 1997.

Legend of the Five Rings Roleplaying Game won the 2006 Gold Ennie Award for "Best Interior Art".

In a review of Legend of the Five Rings Roleplaying Game in Black Gate, Scott Taylor said "L5R was epic, a Matt Wilson cover making me sit up and take notice, and the mechanics of game play a fresh change from the D20 of D&D and the D6 of Shadowrun as L5R introduced 'exploding D10s'. The setting, an amalgam of Asian culture called Rokugan, overwhelmed, and although my mindset is distinctly and irrevocably western, I still fell into this game head first."

Scott Taylor for Black Gate in 2013 rated Legend of the Five Rings as Honorable Mention #2 in the top ten role-playing games of all time, saying "Where games like Bushido and Oriental Adventures failed to hold market share, L5R stayed the course and not only taught us what honor truly means, but also gave everyone the ability to live out a samurai fantasy that sat unattended in their imaginations. Certainly helped along by its popular collectible card game of the same name, L5R nonetheless has produced some absolutely fantastic role-playing books in the half a dozen editions since its inception."
