= Jared Sorensen =

Role-playing game designer

Jared A. Sorensen is an indie role-playing game designer whose works include InSpectres, octaNe, and Lacuna Part I.

== Career ==
Jared Sorensen was a member of the website The Forge, and later became an indie publisher. Sorensen designed the Schism mini-supplement for Sorcerer which was published as a PDF by Adept Press in 2001. Sorensen designed humorous role-playing game about ghost-busting, InSpectres (2002). The award for Most Innovative Game at the Indie RPG Awards went to Lacuna (2006) by Sorensen.

His Memento Mori Theatricks site has been the host to over a dozen little games.

He was also the co-founder of Wicked Dead Brewing Company with John Wick.

From 1997 to 2007, Jared worked for a number of computer game companies in San Francisco and the Greater Boston Area, including PF.Magic, Mattel Interactive, LucasArts, Tilted Mill Entertainment and Turbine. In September 2007, Jared was hired as a Senior Game Design at Hidden City Games. In 2010 he published FreeMarket, co-designed with Luke Crane and licensed through Hidden City Games. A year before, in 2009, he published the first of live-action text adventure game Parsely series, Action Castle. It was followed by seven additional games.

He worked at Plyfe as the VP of Games.

Jared Sorensen is also listed on the development team of 2012's Torchbearer (by Thor Olavsrud and Luke Crane, published by Burning Wheel).

During Cambridge Science Week in April 2016, Sorensen hosted a large-scale game of Space Station at the Boston Museum of Science's Charles Hayden Planetarium. 200 players explored the confines of a doomed space station undergoing bombardment by malevolent aliens. The game featured ambient sound and 360° graphics projected onto the planetarium dome.
