= John R. Phythyon Jr. =

Role-playing game designer

- Occupation: Game designer

John R. Phythyon Jr. is a game designer who has worked primarily on role-playing games.

== Career ==
Phythyon ran a small-press role-playing game publishing company, Event Horizon Productions. Phythyon was hired as a partner in Guardians of Order in 2000 and was made their Sales & Marketing Director, with Guardians also acquiring Event Horizon Productions and its games including Heaven and Earth by Phythyon. Phythyon soon guided Guardians towards role-playing games that were not based on anime, starting with Ghost Dog (2000), a gangster Samurai game designed by David L. Pulver and Phythyon, which used the Tri-stat system and was based on the film of the same name.
