= John Wick (game designer) =

American role-playing game designer

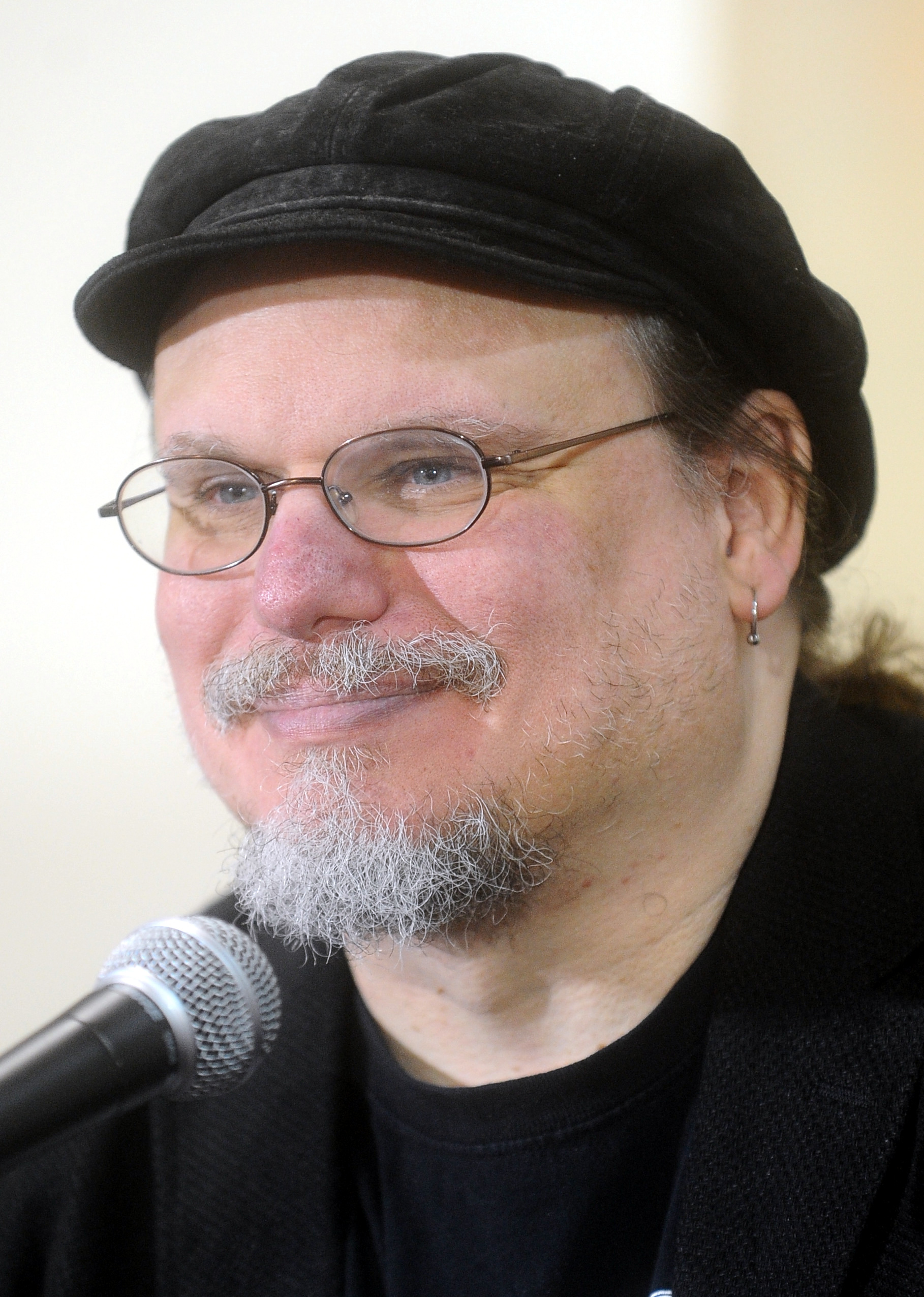
- Wick in 2017
- Occupation: role-playing game designer

John Wick is an American role-playing game designer best known for his creative contributions to the tabletop role playing games Legend of the Five Rings and 7th Sea. He self-published Orkworld under the Wicked Press banner, and later co-founded the Wicked Dead Brewing Company with Jared Sorensen. His games under that company include Cat, Schauermärchen, Enemy Gods, and Thirty. He has won the Origins Award for Best Role-Playing Game and Best Collectible Card Game twice (for both the Legend of the Five Rings and 7th Sea role-playing games and collectible card games).

He has also written for White Wolf, Inc., Pinnacle Entertainment Group, and worked for various video game companies, providing storyline and dialogue. He has written two regular online columns: The Game Designer's Journal (for The Gaming Outpost) and Play Dirty (for Pyramid Magazine).

== Career ==
In 1995, Wick was a freelance writer living in Southern California. He had submitted articles to Shadis Magazine, Alderac Entertainment Group's independent game magazine, attracting the attention of the magazine's assistant editor, D.J. Trindle. He was brought on as a staff writer at Trindle's request.

=== Legend of the Five Rings ===
Soon after joining AEG, Wick became involved with the production and design of the Legend of the Five Rings Collectible Card Game, along with the rest of the company. He worked with Matthew D. Wilson, the game's art director and David Williams, the game's lead designer. He served as "continuity editor", which meant that he was responsible for the game's characters and plot details.

Wick served as L5R's continuity editor for the Emerald edition, Obsidian edition, and Jade edition sets, including the Shadowlands, Forbidden Knowledge, Anvil of Despair, Crimson & Jade, and Time of the Void expansions. He was also the primary source for storyline, flavor text and character for The Scorpion Coup set. Wick also led the design team that created the Legend of the Five Rings Roleplaying Game (1997). Wick left the L5R design team shortly thereafter to work on AEG's forthcoming 7th Sea project.

=== 7th Sea ===
7th Sea (1998), the second RPG published by AEG, was designed by Wick, Jennifer Wick, and Kevin Wilson. 7th Sea is AEG's swashbuckling setting. Initially proposed by Wick and his wife Jennifer, the game was intended to be self-contained, but quickly evolved into a much larger project. Telling the story of the world of Théah, a fantasy amalgam of Restoration Age Europe, 7th Sea included pirates, musketeers, explorers and magic.

Wick wrote and developed much of the project, including the 7th Sea Players Guide, Game Masters Guide, Avalon Sourcebook, GM screen, and Knights of the Rose and Cross sourcebook. He left AEG after his work on the Avalon Sourcebook was finished. On November 3, 2015, AEG announced that it had sold the rights to the 7th Sea property back to Wick, and entered a partnership with him to publish certain licensed games using the property. On April 2, 2019, Chaosium announced on their official blog their acquisition of the rights to the 7th Sea product line from John Wick.

=== Orkworld ===
Wick wrote, designed, and developed Orkworld, a reverse-fantasy game where orks are the heroes and the "monsters" are humans, dwarves, and elves. The game was released the same year as Dungeons & Dragons third edition and was nominated for the Origins Award for the Best Game Fiction. The game was illustrated by Thomas Denmark.

=== Neopets ===
After spending time in San Francisco, he returned to Los Angeles and began working at Neopets, writing stories for the Neopedia. He also helped develop the Neopets CCG.

=== Upper Deck ===
Wick was also a major contributor to the award-winning Vs. System CCG (Marvel TCG and DC Comics TCG) published by The Upper Deck Company.

=== The Wicked Dead Brewing Company ===
Wick began a new joint publishing venture with his friend Jared Sorensen in 2004. It was called the Wicked Dead Brewing Company, based on Wick's previous publishing venture Wicked Press and Sorenson's Memento Mori Theatricks). It has published over a dozen roleplaying games, board games, and Wick's self-published a novel titled No Loyal Knight. Wick published a number of fantasy indie role-playing games using dice-pool mechanics, including Enemy Gods (2004) and Cat (2006).

=== Houses of the Blooded ===
In 2007, Wick announced a return to "big game design" in his LiveJournal. The game, called Houses of the Blooded, was released at the 2008 Origins Game Fair. The game focuses on "the ven" (a race of magically created humanoids) and the world of Shanri (both of which appear in the game, Enemy Gods). The pre-order for the 100 limited edition copies of Houses of the Blooded sold out in exactly one week on the Indie Press Revolution website. Wick released a soundtrack with the new game, focusing on "ven blood opera," an in-game element. Songs from the opera can be heard on the Houses of the Blooded website.

Wick was keeping an open log of his design of this game on LiveJournal. He has stated that his intention was to release several stand alone supplements that would detail various aspects of the world of Shanri. Each book would allow players to play a different role in Shanri and, and said, "almost feel as if they're playing a different game." The books mentioned were a 'slumming' book where players play ven nobles from cities (as opposed to 'country' ven detailed in the main book), a wilderness book where vassals of the ven nobles fight off orks, explore dungeons, and possibly kill dragons, and a Suaven book where details regarding the Ancestor worship religion of the ven would be revealed.

In 2009 Wick started a new company — John Wick Presents, and partnered with Cubicle 7 to reissue Houses of the Blooded. He also released Curse of the Yellow Sign and Blood & Honor through this company.

== Personal life ==
In November 2005, Wick became a Freemason, joining Liberal Arts Lodge of Los Angeles, California. He is a Master Mason. Wick was a founding member and the drummer for the band The Awful Lot.

== Publications ==
- Legend of the Five Rings Roleplaying Game (author and lead designer)
- Legend of the Five Rings (collectible card game) (design team and story editor)
- Legend of the Five Rings: Roleplaying in the Emerald Empire
- 7th Sea (role-playing game) (creator, co-author, lead designer)
- 7th Sea (collectible card game) (co-creator, design team, story editor)
- How Bashthraka Lost His Spear
- Orkworld (author and designer)
- Time of Void

== Awards ==
- 1997 Origins Award Best Card Game - Legend of the Five Rings: Battle of Beiden Pass
- 1997 RPGA Gamer's Choice Award Best Roleplaying Game - Legend of the Five Rings: Roleplaying in the Emerald Empire
- 2017 ENNIE Awards Best Game (Silver), Best Rules (Gold), Best Free Product Free Rules (Gold), Best Supplement Pirate Nations (Silver), Product of the Year (Silver) - 7th Sea
