= Brian Snoddy =

American artist

- Known for: Fantasy art
- Website: www.briansnoddyart.com

Brian Snoddy is an artist whose work has appeared in role-playing games.

== Career ==
Brian Snoddy and his friend Matt Wilson formed Privateer Press with writer Matt Staroscik to publish their own d20 supplements. The interior and cover artwork for Privateer's initial adventures, which were published in 2001, was created by Snoddy and Wilson. Snoddy was the penciller for the Classic Star Wars: The Early Adventures comics as well as one of the illustrators for the Knights of the Old Republic Campaign Guide. His Dungeons & Dragons work includes books such as Deities & Demigods, Libris Mortis, and Magic of Faerûn. Snoddy is credited with inking some of the early Girl Genius comics. Snoddy is also known for his work on the Magic: The Gathering collectible card game.
