= The Way of the Dragon (Legend of the Five Rings Roleplaying Game) =

Fantasy role-playing game supplement

- Cover art by Matt Wilson
- Author: Cris Dornaus; Greg Stolze; D.J. Trindle; David Williams; Rob Vaux; John Wick; David Williams
- Illustrator: Thomas Biondolillo; Cris Dornaus; K.C. Lancaster; William O'Connor; Ben Peck; Brian Snoddy
- Series: Way of the Clans
- Genre: Feudal Japan fantasy
- Publisher: Alderac Entertainment Group
- Publication date: 1999; 27 years ago
- Followed by: The Way of the Unicorn

The Way of the Dragon, subtitled "Way of the Clans: Book 1", is a supplement published by the Alderac Entertainment Group (AEG) in 1997 for the fantasy role-playing game Legend of the Five Rings Roleplaying Game. It is the first in a series of eleven books describing the clans of Rokugan.

== Contents ==
The Way of the Dragon is a supplement in which the secrets of the Dragon Clan are unveiled with new character options, skills, artifacts, martial techniques, and lore.

The book describes in detail the mysterious Dragon clan. The book begins with short story. There are sections describing the history of the clan; its social and political structure; the main families; and profiles of schools only briefly mentioned in the core rulebook. Another chapter introduces new skills, and new advantages and disadvantages — some of which are exclusive to the Lion clan. Some notable people of the clan are described in detail.

The French edition also includes a short chapter giving advice on how to play an Ise-Zumi character.

The appendices cover the mythological dragons of Rokugan, the martial art of warrior-monks, spells, magic items, potions, adventure inspirations, the geography of the various provinces, maps of Mirumoto Castle, and reference sheets.

== Publication history ==
The land of Rokugan, a fictional setting based on feudal Japan, was originally published as Legend of the Five Rings by AEG and ISOMEDIA in 1995. Two years later, AEG released Legend of the Five Rings Roleplaying Game, which used the Rokugan setting. Shortly after its release, AEG published the first in a series of supplements about the clans of Rokugan, The Way of the Dragon, a 104-page book written by Cris Dornaus, Greg Stolze, D.J. Trindle, David Williams, Rob Vaux, John Wick, and David Williams, with cover art by Matt Wilson, and interior art by Thomas Biondolillo, Cris Dornaus, K.C. Lancaster, William O'Connor, Ben Peck, and Brian Snoddy

In 1998, Siroz Publications released a French translation titled La Voie du Dragon.

== Reception ==
In Issue 8 of the French games magazine Backstab, Geoffrey Picard called this "a masterpiece ... an indispensable tool for any storyteller of the Emerald Empire's legends." Picard was enthralled, writing, "This supplement abounds with good things; the game master will be delighted to find scenario or NPC ideas on every page." Picard concluded by giving this book a rating of 9 out of 10, saying, "In the end, an excellent supplement primarily intended for game masters."

In Issue 117 of the French games magazine Casus Belli, Mehdi Sahmi reviewed the French translation of this book and noted, "The Dragon Clan guide gets right into the heart of the matter, allowing you to discover the great powers of Rokugan." Sahmi pointed out, "The only drawback is that it's all very warlike and tends to delve into the politics of Rokugan society, even if it's true that the Dragon Clan lives on the margins of it." Sahmi concluded with a strong recommendation, writing, "In short, you've just bought The Book of Five Rings and you want to know which supplements you'll need. It's simple. You'll hardly be able to do without all of the supplements. (All of them? Yes, all of them!)."
