= Carl Frank =

Artist

- Known for: Fantasy art

Carl Frank is an artist whose work has appeared in role-playing games.

== Education ==
He graduated from California State University, Fullerton with a BFA in illustration.

== Career ==
His Dungeons & Dragons work includes Scourge of the Howling Horde (2006), Player's Handbook II (2006), Monster Manual IV (2006), Tome of Magic (2006), Cityscape (2006), Complete Mage (2006), Dungeonscape (2007), Complete Scoundrel (2007), Rules Compendium (2007), and the 4th edition Monster Manual (2008).

He is known for his work on the Magic: The Gathering collectible card game, and has also contributed art for the World of Warcraft Trading Card Game and Hearthstone.
