= Cris Dornaus =

Visual artist

- Known for: Fantasy art

Cristina Dornaus McAllister is an artist whose work has appeared in role-playing games.

== Career ==
Cris Dornaus worked on Way of the Unicorn for Legend of the Five Rings Roleplaying Game. Her Dungeons & Dragons work includes interior art for Oriental Adventures and Complete Divine, and she is known for her work on the Magic: The Gathering collectible card game.

She has also worked as Cristina McAllister with her own art studio and shop in Los Angeles.
