= Alderac Entertainment Group =

Game publisher

- Company type: Privately held company
- Industry: Board games
- Founded: 1993
- Headquarters: Henderson, Nevada, U.S.
- Key people: John Zinser; Ryan Dancey
- Products: Cascadia; Cat Lady; Mystic Vale; Space Base; Smash Up!; Tiny Towns; Thunderstone Quest
- Owner: John Zinser
- Number of employees: 15 FTE
- Website: www.alderac.com

Alderac Entertainment Group (AEG) is a publisher of family board game products. AEG was formed by Jolly Blackburn in 1993. Blackburn left the company in 1995 and the majority of the company is now owned by President & CEO John Zinser. The company is virtual and does not have a physical headquarters but it is legally domiciled in the city of Henderson, Nevada.

AEG's first product was Shadis Magazine (winner of the 1994, 1995, and 1996 Origins Awards for Best Professional Gaming Magazine). In 1994 the company began working on the development of the Legend of the Five Rings Collectible Card Game; that game was published in 1995. Throughout the 1990s AEG expanded its CCG offerings and began designing and publishing Role-Playing Game and Miniatures Wargame Game products as well. The company has exited the CCG, RPG and Miniatures Wargame categories and now exclusively publishes family board games.

Including the three for Shadis mentioned above, AEG products have garnered twenty Origins Awards (see the individual articles noted below for more details).

In 2014, Love Letter was on the recommended list published by the Spiel des Jahres judges committee.

In 2022, Cascadia, which AEG co-publishes with Flatout Games won the Spiel des Jahres Game of the Year award. AEG & Flatout licensed the game to Kosmos for the award-winning German language edition.

== Current products ==
- Cat Lady
- Cascadia - co-published with Flatout Games
- Mystic Vale
- Nightfall
- Smash Up
- Space Base
- Tiny Towns
- Thunderstone Quest
- War Chest

== Discontinued products ==
=== Games sold to other publishers ===
- 7th Sea Collectible Card Game (Multiple Origins Award winner)
- Doomtown Collectible Card Game (Multiple Origins Award winner)
- Legend of the Burning Sands
- Legend of the Five Rings
- Love Letter
- Spycraft

=== Collectible card games ===
- City of Heroes Collectible Card Game
- HumAliens
- Initial D
- Romance of the Nine Empires
- Warlord: Saga of the Storm

=== Role-playing games ===
- many d20 System Sourcebooks such as
  - Evil
  - Dungeons: A Guide to Survival in the Realms Below
  - Sundered Faith
- Brave New World
- Farscape Roleplaying Game
- Legend of the Five Rings Role-Playing Game (Origins Award winner)
- Shadowforce Archer
- Stargate SG-1
- Swashbuckling Adventures (previously 7th Sea which won an Origins Award)
- Ultimate Toolbox
- Warlords of the Accordlands
- World's Largest Dungeon
- World's Largest City

=== Miniatures ===
- Clan War (Legend of the Five Rings Miniature Combat)

== See also ==
- Dungeons (Alderac Entertainment Group)
- Evil (Alderac Entertainment Group)
- Good (Alderac Entertainment Group)
