= List of Magic: The Gathering sets =

Comprehensive list of Magic: The Gathering card sets since its inception in 1993

The trading card game Magic: The Gathering has released a large number of sets since it was first published by Wizards of the Coast. After the 1993 release of Limited Edition, also known as Alpha and Beta, roughly 3-4 major sets have been released per year, in addition to various spin-off products.

Magic has made three types of sets since Alpha and Beta: base/core sets, expansion sets, and compilation sets. Expansion sets are the most numerous and prevalent type of expansion; they primarily consist of new cards, with few or no reprints, and either explore a new setting, or advance the plot in an existing setting. Base sets, later renamed core sets, are the successors to the original Limited Edition and are meant to provide a baseline Magic experience; they tended to consist either largely or entirely of reprints. Compilation sets also exist entirely of reprints, and tend to be made as either a special themed product, or as a way to increase supply of cards with small printings. Examples of compilation sets with randomized boosters include Chronicles and Modern Masters. There also exist compilation products with a pre-selected and fixed card pool, such as the Duel Decks and From The Vault series. Theme decks serve a similar function; however, they are always attached to a specific set or block, while compilations are free to pick and choose cards from any set.

All expansion sets, and all editions of the base set from Sixth Edition onward, are identified by an expansion symbol printed on the right side of cards, below the art and above the text box. From Exodus onward, the expansion symbols are also color-coded to denote rarity: black for common and basic land cards, silver for uncommon, and gold for rare. Beginning with the Shards of Alara set, a red-orange expansion symbol denotes a new rarity: "Mythic Rare" (the Time Spiral set featured an additional purple coloration for "timeshifted" cards). For the early expansion sets (from Arabian Nights to Alliances), the rarities of cards were often much more complicated than the breakdown into common, uncommon, and rare suggests. Cards in compilations are assigned partially arbitrary rarity by Wizards, with some cards assigned rare status and some assigned mythic rare in a given set.

== Base/core set editions ==
After the second version (Beta) of the first set, which contained two cards mistakenly excluded from the first version (Alpha), all subsequent base sets through 10th Edition consisted of cards that had been printed before in either the original base set or an expansion set. Alpha through Fifth Edition did not have set symbols printed on the actual cards, though those sets were retroactively given set symbols in Wizards of the Coast's official Gatherer database of Magic cards.

Set	Set symbol description	Set code	Pre-release date	Release date	Size						
Set	Set symbol description	Set code	Pre-release date	Release date	Total cards	Common	Uncommon	Rare	Mythic Rare	Basic Land	Other
Limited Edition Alpha	—N/a	LEA	—N/a	August 5, 1993	295^{[I]}	74	95	116	—	10	—
Limited Edition Beta	—N/a	LEB	—N/a	October 4, 1993	302^{[I]}	75	95	117	—	15	—
Unlimited Edition	—N/a	2ED	—N/a	December 1, 1993	302^{[I]}	75	95	117	—	15	—
Revised Edition^{[II]}	—N/a	3ED	—N/a	April 11, 1994	306	75	95	121	—	15	—
Fourth Edition	Roman-numeral four	4ED	—N/a	April 1995	378	121	121	121	—	15	—
Fifth Edition	Roman-numeral five^{[III]}	5ED	—N/a	March 24, 1997	449	165	132	132	—	20	—
Classic Sixth Edition	A Roman-numeral six	6ED	—N/a	April 28, 1999	350	110	110	110	—	20	—
Seventh Edition	A serif numeral seven	7ED	—N/a	April 11, 2001	350	110	110	110	—	20	—
Eighth Edition	The number eight superimposed over three fanned cards	8ED	—N/a	July 28, 2003	357	110	110	110	—	20	7^{[IV]}
Ninth Edition	The number nine superimposed over three fanned cards	9ED	—N/a	July 29, 2005	359	110	110	110	—	20	9^{[IV]}
Tenth Edition	A Roman-numeral ten	10E	—N/a	July 13, 2007	383	121	121	121	—	20	—
Magic 2010	"M10"	M10	July 11, 2009	July 17, 2009	249	101	60	53	15	20	—
Magic 2011	"M11"	M11	July 10, 2010	July 16, 2010	249	101	60	53	15	20	—
Magic 2012	"M12"	M12	July 9, 2011	July 15, 2011	249	101	60	53	15	20	—
Magic 2013	"M13"	M13	July 7, 2012	July 13, 2012	249	101	60	53	15	20	—
Magic 2014	"M14"	M14	July 13, 2013	July 19, 2013	249	101	60	53	15	20	—
Magic 2015	"M15"	M15	July 12, 2014	July 18, 2014	284	101	80	53	15	20	15^{[IV]}
Magic Origins	Planeswalker symbol breaking through the horizon	ORI	July 11, 2015	July 17, 2015	288	101	80	55	16	20	16^{[IV]}
Core Set 2019	"M19"	M19	July 7, 2018	July 13, 2018	280	111	80	53	16	20	—
Core Set 2020	"M20"	M20	July 5, 2019	July 12, 2019	321	152	86	65	16	20	—
Core Set 2021	"M21"	M21	June 26, 2020	July 3, 2020	274	111	80	53	15	15	—
Magic: The Gathering Foundations	A five-point star-shaped portal	FDN		November 15, 2024	292	91	101	60	20	20	—

== Expansion sets ==
Expansion sets from Ice Age to Rivals of Ixalan (with the exception of Homelands) came in groups called "blocks". Blocks were cohesive products: they usually centered around one plane, followed a particular storyline, and contained cards and mechanics that supported both. Blocks generally consisted of one large "stand-alone" expansion set of 250-380 cards, followed by one or two small expansion sets of 141-200 cards which continue the themes introduced in the large set. Like the base set, stand-alone expansion sets contain basic land cards; other expansion sets do not. Beginning with Alliances, expansion sets were given codenames while in development; the code names of the expansions of a block usually fit together to form a phrase or common theme. Ice Age, Homelands, and Alliances were retroactively declared a block at some point, despite Homelands not being connected to the other two in any way. In 2006, WotC retroactively dropped Homelands from the Ice Age cycle and added Coldsnap to it. With the Zendikar cycle in 2009, the traditional large-small-small block structure began to be varied, with some blocks including a second large set later in the cycle. Starting with the Battle for Zendikar block in 2015, the default structure of a block was changed to large-small, with two blocks released per year and each block consisting of only two sets.

Ice Age and Alliances were the first two sets to have a well-defined relationship, but the idea of calling connected sets a "block" or "cycle" did not exist at the time of printing. Also beginning with Alliances in June 1996, expansion sets were released in a regular pattern: the base sets were released in October with the small expansion sets being released in February and June. With the exceptions of Stronghold, a 1998 set released in March rather than February, and Scourge, a 2003 set which was released in May rather than June, this pattern of months was never broken, over a 10-year period, until 2006, when Dissension was also released a month early in May instead of June, because of the July release of Coldsnap. The third set in a block has since been released in late April or early May. From 2005-2015, there was a fourth release date each year in mid-July, usually reserved for base sets. Other summer releases included Coldsnap and Eventide.^{[XXVI]}

Fallen Empires was an experimental expansion in which most cards have three or four different pieces of artwork. You could see them as 121 common cards, by art, or 36 cards by the text. It was also a major expansion in the idea of tribes, especially Goblins and Merfolk.

Most early expansion sets did not have exact release dates; they were just shipped out within the space of a week, and retailers could start selling them as soon as the sets were received. By the time of Alliances in 1996, however, release dates were set as Mondays (the earliest set with an exact Monday release date might possibly have preceded Alliances, but Alliances is the earliest set with a cited and confirmed Monday release date). Beginning with Mirrodin in 2003, the release dates were changed from Monday to Friday. All sets beginning with Homelands^{[VI]} also have a pre-release date, on which cards are sold in limited quantities in pre-release tournaments. These tournaments were formerly always held two weeks before the release date, but since Shards of Alara they are now held one week before the release date.

Premium cards have been inserted into booster packs since Urza's Legacy. Originally 1 premium card was inserted for every 100 cards. The ratio was changed to 1 in 70 cards with the Torment expansion. Beginning with Tenth Edition the rate was increased to 1 in 56 cards. This later changed to 1 in 45 cards with "Core Set 2020"

Starting with Battle for Zendikar cycle, sets sometimes also contain an entry in the Masterpiece Series.

The block model has evolved as time went on. In addition to a formalized structure (which was occasionally varied) Wizards began to have trouble developing small sets that satisfied their own quality standards. Players also reported fatigue at playing in the same environment for a year at a time. The decision to remove one small set from each block, as showcased in Battle For Zendikar block, was a result of this dissatisfaction. It culminated in the decision to delete small sets entirely; since the conclusion of Ixalan cycle, all sets have been large-sized sets. However, not all large-size sets will involve travel to a new plane; some will be sequels to the set prior to it, if the depth of the plane's story and mechanics allows. Dominaria, released in 2018, was the first set under this model.

Set	Expansion symbol	Expansion symbol description	Expansion code	Development codename	Pre-release date	Release date	Size						
Set	Expansion symbol	Expansion symbol description	Expansion code	Development codename	Pre-release date	Release date	Total Cards	Common	Uncommon	Rare	Mythic Rare	Basic Land	Other
Pre-cycle sets
Arabian Nights	expansion symbol	A scimitar	ARN	Arabian Nights	none	December 1993	92^{[V]}	41	19	32	—	1	—
Antiquities	expansion symbol	An anvil	ATQ	Antiquities	none	March 1994	100^{[VI]}	30	44	26	—	—	—
Legends	expansion symbol	The capital of a Doric column	LEG	Legends	none	June 1994	310	75	114	121	—	—	—
The Dark	expansion symbol	A thin crescent moon	DRK	The Dark	none	August 1994	119	40	44	35	—	—	—
Fallen Empires	expansion symbol	A crown	FEM	Fallen Empires	none	November 1994	187^{[VII]}	121	66	—	—	—	—
Ice Age	expansion symbol	A snowflake	ICE	Ice Age	none^{[VII]}	June 1995	383	121	121	121	—	15	—
Homelands^{[IX]}	expansion symbol	The globe of Ulgrotha	HML	Homelands	October 14, 1995^{[VII]}	October 1995	140^{[X]}	71	27	42	—	—	—
Alliances	expansion symbol	A flowing banner	ALL	Quack	May 18, 1996	June 10, 1996	199^{[XI]}	110	43	46	—	—	—
Mirage Block
Mirage	expansion symbol	A palm tree	MIR	Sosumi/Menagerie	September 21, 1996^{[XXV]}	October 7, 1996	350	110	110	110	—	20	—
Visions	expansion symbol	Zhalfirin Triangle of War/stylized "V"	VIS	Mirage Jr.	January 11, 1997	February 3, 1997	167	62	55	50	—	—	—
Weatherlight	expansion symbol	The Thran Tome, an open book	WTH	Mochalatte	May 31, 1997	June 9, 1997	167	62	55	50	—	—	—
Tempest Block
Tempest	expansion symbol	A storm cloud	TMP	Bogavhati	October 4, 1997	October 13, 1997	350	110	110	110	—	20	—
Stronghold	expansion symbol	A portcullis	STH	Rachimulot	February 21, 1998	March 2, 1998	143	55	44	44	—	—	—
Exodus	expansion symbol	A bridge	EXO	Gorgonzola	June 6, 1998	June 15, 1998	143	55	44	44	—	—	—
Urza's Block
Urza's Saga	expansion symbol	Two gears	USG	Armadillo	October 3, 1998	October 12, 1998	350	110	110	110	—	20	—
Urza's Legacy	expansion symbol	A hammer	ULG	Guacamole	February 6, 1999	February 15, 1999	143	55	44	44	—	—	—
Urza's Destiny	expansion symbol	An Erlenmeyer flask	UDS	Chimichanga	May 29, 1999	June 7, 1999	143	55	44	44	—	—	—
Masques Block
Mercadian Masques	expansion symbol	A domino mask	MMQ	Archimedes	September 25, 1999	October 4, 1999	350	110	110	110	—	20	—
Nemesis	expansion symbol	The spiked halberd wielded by Crovax	NEM	Euripides	February 5, 2000	February 14, 2000	143	55	44	44	—	—	—
Prophecy	expansion symbol	Three crystals	PCY	Dionysus	May 27, 2000	June 5, 2000	143	55	44	44	—	—	—
Invasion Block
Invasion	expansion symbol	The symbol of the Coalition^{[XII]}	INV	Beijing	September 23, 2000	October 2, 2000	350	110	110	110	—	20	—
Planeshift	expansion symbol	Two swirling planes	PLS	Hong Kong	January 27, 2001	February 5, 2001	143	55	44	44	—	—	—
Apocalypse	expansion symbol	The mask of Yawgmoth	APC	Shanghai	May 26, 2001	June 4, 2001	143	55	44	44	—	—	—
Odyssey Block
Odyssey	expansion symbol	The Mirari on a twisted stand	ODY	Argon	September 22, 2001	October 1, 2001	350	110	110	110	—	20	—
Torment	expansion symbol	An ouroboros / A nightmare creature	TOR	Boron	January 26, 2002	February 4, 2002	143	55	44	44	—	—	—
Judgment	expansion symbol	A balancing scale	JUD	Carbon	May 18, 2002	May 27, 2002	143	55	44	44	—	—	—
Onslaught Block
Onslaught	expansion symbol	A four-legged "morph"^{[XIII]} creature	ONS	Manny	September 28, 2002	October 7, 2002	350	110	110	110	—	20	—
Legions	expansion symbol	Two crossed spears behind a shield	LGN	Moe	January 25, 2003	February 3, 2003	145	55	45	45	—	—	—
Scourge	expansion symbol	A dragon mask/skull	SCG	Jack	May 17, 2003	May 26, 2003	143	55	44	44	—	—	—
Mirrodin Block
Mirrodin	expansion symbol	The Sword of Kaldra	MRD	Bacon	September 20, 2003	October 2, 2003	306	110	88	88	—	20	—
Darksteel	expansion symbol	The shield of Kaldra	DST	Lettuce	January 24, 2004	February 6, 2004	165	55	55	55	—	—	—
Fifth Dawn	expansion symbol	The helm of Kaldra	5DN	Tomato	May 22, 2004	June 4, 2004	165	55	55	55	—	—	—
Kamigawa Block
Champions of Kamigawa	expansion symbol	A torii gate	CHK	Earth	September 18, 2004	October 1, 2004	306	110	88^{[XIV]}	88	—	20	—
Betrayers of Kamigawa	expansion symbol	A shuriken	BOK	Wind	January 22, 2005	February 4, 2005	165	55	55	55	—	—	—
Saviors of Kamigawa	expansion symbol	A Japanese-style lantern	SOK	Fire	May 21, 2005	June 3, 2005	165	55	55	55	—	—	—
Ravnica Block
Ravnica: City of Guilds	expansion symbol	A Gothic-style church tower	RAV	Control	September 24, 2005	October 7, 2005	306	110	88	88	—	20	—
Guildpact	expansion symbol	The seal of the Guildpact	GPT	Alt	January 21, 2006	February 3, 2006	165	55	55	55	—	—	—
Dissension	expansion symbol	The broken seal of the Guildpact	DIS	Delete	April 22, 2006	May 5, 2006	180	60	60	60	—	—	—
Coldsnap
Coldsnap^{[IX]}	expansion symbol	A hanging trio of icicles	CSP	Splat	July 8, 2006	July 21, 2006	155	60	55	40	—	—	—
Time Spiral Block
Time Spiral	expansion symbol	An hourglass	TSP/TSB^{[XV]}	Snap	September 23, 2006	October 6, 2006	422^{[XV]}	121	80	80	—	20	121
Planar Chaos	expansion symbol	Overlapping planes	PLC	Crackle	January 20, 2007	February 2, 2007	165^{[XV]}	60	55	50	—	—	—
Future Sight	expansion symbol	An eye gazing through a rift portal	FUT	Pop	April 21, 2007	May 4, 2007	180^{[XV]}	60	60	60	—	—	—
Lorwyn Block
Lorwyn	expansion symbol	Elvish "leaf blade" with a serrated edge	LRW	Peanut	September 29, 2007	October 12, 2007	301	121	80	80	—	20	—
Morningtide	expansion symbol	Sunrise / A flame	MOR	Butter	January 19, 2008	February 1, 2008	150	60	40	50	—	—	—
Shadowmoor Block
Shadowmoor	expansion symbol	Crown of the Reaper King	SHM	Jelly	April 19, 2008	May 2, 2008	301	121	80	80	—	20	—
Eventide	expansion symbol	Eclipsed sun	EVE	Doughnut	July 12, 2008	July 25, 2008	180	60	60	60	—	—	—
Alara Block
Shards of Alara	expansion symbol	5 shards of a plane	ALA	Rock	September 27, 2008	October 3, 2008	249	101	60	53	15	20	—
Conflux	expansion symbol	5 shards coming together	CON	Paper	January 31, 2009	February 6, 2009	145	60	40	35	10	—	—
Alara Reborn	expansion symbol	5 shards connected	ARB	Scissors	April 25, 2009	April 30, 2009	145	60	40	35	10	—	—
Zendikar Block
Zendikar	expansion symbol	A hedron	ZEN	Live	September 26, 2009	October 2, 2009	249	101	60	53	15	20	—
Worldwake	expansion symbol	A hedron opening	WWK	Long	January 30, 2010	February 5, 2010	145	60	40	35	10	—	—
Rise of the Eldrazi	expansion symbol	A hedron opened	ROE	Prosper	April 17, 2010	April 23, 2010	248	100	60	53	15	20	—
Scars of Mirrodin Block
Scars of Mirrodin	expansion symbol	Encircled hexplate with a smaller hex cut out	SOM	Lights	September 25, 2010	October 1, 2010	249	101	60	53	15	20	—
Mirrodin Besieged	expansion symbol	Mirran/Phyrexian symbols combined	MBS	Camera	January 29, 2011	February 4, 2011	155	60	40	35	10	10	—
New Phyrexia	expansion symbol	The letter Phi, the symbol of Phyrexia	NPH	Action	May 7, 2011	May 13, 2011	175	60	60	35	10	10	—
Innistrad Block
Innistrad	expansion symbol	Two stylized outward facing herons	ISD	Shake	September 24, 2011	September 30, 2011	264^{[XXVII]}	107	67	59	16	15	—
Dark Ascension	expansion symbol	Innistrad symbol turned inward	DKA	Rattle	January 28, 2012	February 3, 2012	158^{[XXVII]}	64	44	38	12	—	—
Avacyn Restored	expansion symbol	The collar of Avacyn	AVR	Roll	April 28, 2012	May 4, 2012	244	101	60	53	15	15	—
Return to Ravnica Block
Return to Ravnica	expansion symbol	Symbol of the five guilds in set	RTR	Hook	September 29, 2012	October 5, 2012	274	101	80	53	15	25	—
Gatecrash	expansion symbol	Pointed arch	GTC	Line	January 26, 2013	February 1, 2013	249	101	80	53	15	—	—
Dragon's Maze	expansion symbol	Return to Ravnica and Gatecrash symbols combined	DGM	Sinker	April 27, 2013	May 3, 2013	156^{[XXVIII]}	70	40	35	11	—	—
Theros Block
Theros	expansion symbol	Column and arcs	THS	Friends	September 21, 2013	September 27, 2013	249	101	60	53	15	20	—
Born of the Gods	expansion symbol	Horns of Xenagos	BNG	Romans	February 1, 2014	February 7, 2014	165	60	60	35	10	—	—
Journey into Nyx	expansion symbol	Horns of Xenagos and column	JOU	Countrymen	April 26, 2014	May 2, 2014	165	60	60	35	10	—	—
Khans of Tarkir Block
Khans of Tarkir	expansion symbol	Two crossed scimitars in front of a shield	KTK	Huey	September 20, 2014	September 26, 2014	269	101	80	53	15	20	—
Fate Reforged	expansion symbol	Two mirrored fangs/timelines	FRF	Dewey	January 17, 2015	January 23, 2015	185^{[XXIX]}	70	60	35	10	10	—
Dragons of Tarkir	expansion symbol	A shield in the shape of a dragon's face	DTK	Louie	March 21, 2015	March 27, 2015	264	101	80	53	15	15	—
Battle for Zendikar Block
Battle for Zendikar	expansion symbol	A hedron with a "Z" crimp	BFZ	Blood	September 26, 2015	October 2, 2015	274^{[XXX]}	101	80	53	15	25	—^{[XXX]}
Oath of the Gatewatch	expansion symbol	Kozilek blade projections	OGW	Sweat	January 16, 2016	January 22, 2016	184^{[XXX]}	70	60	42	12	2	—^{[XXX]}
Shadows over Innistrad Block
Shadows over Innistrad	expansion symbol	Avacyn's collar deformed (in this case, upside-down)	SOI	Tears	April 2, 2016	April 8, 2016	297^{[XXXI]}	105	100	59	18	15	—
Eldritch Moon	expansion symbol	Silhouette of Emrakul	EMN	Fears	July 16, 2016	July 22, 2016	205^{[XXXI]}	74	70	47	14	—	—
Kaladesh Block
Kaladesh	expansion symbol	Vines made of aether	KLD	Lock	September 24, 2016	September 30, 2016	264	101	80	53	15	15	—
Aether Revolt	expansion symbol	Blossom made of aether	AER	Stock	January 14, 2017	January 20, 2017	184	70	60	42	12	—	—
Amonkhet Block
Amonkhet	expansion symbol	Pyramid with floating top	AKH	Barrel	April 22, 2017	April 28, 2017	269	101	80	53	15	20	—
Hour of Devastation	expansion symbol	Horns of Nicol Bolas	HOU	Laughs	July 8, 2017	July 14, 2017	199	70	60	42	12	15	—
Ixalan Block
Ixalan	expansion symbol	Compass rose	XLN	Ham	September 23, 2017	September 29, 2017	279	101	80	63	15	20	—
Rivals of Ixalan	expansion symbol	Half compass rose with two Northern points / Rooftops of Orazca	RIX	Eggs	January 13, 2018	January 19, 2018	196	70	60	48	13	5	—
Three-and-One Model
Dominaria	expansion symbol	Benalish shield	DOM	Soup	April 21, 2018	April 27, 2018	269	101	80	53	15	20	—
Guilds of Ravnica	expansion symbol	A cityscape or crown with five elements	GRN	Spaghetti	September 29, 2018	October 5, 2018	259	111	80	53	15	—	—
Ravnica Allegiance	expansion symbol	An inverted version of Guilds of Ravnica's set symbol	RNA	Meatballs	January 19, 2019	January 25, 2019	259	111	80	53	15	—	—
War of the Spark	expansion symbol	Planeswalker symbol with Nicol Bolas's horns	WAR	Milk	April 27, 2019	May 3, 2019	264	101	80	53	15	15	—
Throne of Eldraine	expansion symbol	Sword with pixie wings	ELD	Archery	September 28, 2019	October 4, 2019	269	101	80	53	15	20	—
Theros Beyond Death	expansion symbol	Mask of the returned	THB	Baseball	January 17, 2020	January 24, 2020	254	101	80	53	15	5	—
Ikoria: Lair of Behemoths	expansion symbol	A monstrous eye	IKO	Cricket	April 17, 2020	May 15, 2020	274	111	80	53	16	15	—
Zendikar Rising	expansion symbol	Hedron and X	ZNR	Diving	September 18, 2020	September 25, 2020	280	101	80	64	20	15	—
Kaldheim	expansion symbol	Battle axe	KHM	Equestrian	January 29, 2021	February 5, 2021	285	111	80	64	20	15	—
Strixhaven: School of Mages	expansion symbol	A Strix	STX	Fencing	April 16, 2021	April 23, 2021	275	105	80	69	21	10	—
Four-set Model
Dungeons & Dragons: Adventures in the Forgotten Realms	expansion symbol	Dragon head inside of 20-sided die	AFR	Zebra (Replaces Core Set)	July 16–22, 2021	July 23, 2021	281	101	80	60	20	20	—
Innistrad: Midnight Hunt	expansion symbol	Wolf howling at moon	MID	Golf	September 17–23, 2021	September 24, 2021	277	100	83	64	20	10	—
Innistrad: Crimson Vow	expansion symbol	Stylized bat	VOW	Clubs	November 12–18, 2021	November 19, 2021	277	101	83	64	20	10	—
Kamigawa: Neon Dynasty	expansion symbol	Rising sun behind a mountain	NEO	Hockey	February 11–17, 2022	February 18, 2022	302	119	87	59	18	20	—
Streets of New Capenna	expansion symbol	Angel wings surrounding brass knuckles	SNC	Ice Skating	April 22, 2022	April 29, 2022	281	99	81	62	19	20	—
Dominaria United	expansion symbol	Coalition symbol over Benalish shield	DMU	Judo	September 2, 2022	September 9, 2022	281	101	80	60	20	20	—
The Brothers' War	expansion symbol	A split gear	BRO	Kayaking	November 11–17, 2022	November 18, 2022	287	101	80	63	23	20	—
Phyrexia: All Will Be One	expansion symbol	Phyrexian symbol bisecting a circle	ONE	Lacrosse	February 3–4, 2023	February 10, 2023	271	101	80	60	20	10	—
March of the Machine	expansion symbol	Elspeth's sword shattering a phyrexian symbol	MOM	Marathon	April 14–20, 2023	April 21, 2023	291	116	80	60	20	15	—
March of the Machine: The Aftermath	expansion symbol	Explosion	MAT	Marathon Epilogue	No Pre-release Scheduled	May 12, 2023	50	0	15	25	10	0	—
Wilds of Eldraine	expansion symbol	An open storybook with a diamond nestled in the pages	WOE	Netball	September 1–7, 2023	September 8, 2023	381	101	80	60	20	15	105
The Lost Caverns of Ixalan	expansion symbol	An eye in the center of a stylised compass rose	LCI	Offroading	November 10–16, 2023	November 17, 2023	291	108	92	64	22	5	119
Murders at Karlov Manor	expansion symbol	A cinquedea Short Sword	MKM	Polo	February 2–8, 2024	February 9, 2024	286	81	100	70	20	15	148 (inc 317z)
Outlaws of Thunder Junction	expansion symbol	A cowboy hat	OTJ	Quilting	April 12, 2024	April 19, 2024	276	91	100	60	20	5	98
Bloomburrow	expansion symbol	A maple leaf	BLB	Rugby	July 26-August 1, 2024	August 2, 2024	281	88	100	64	22	5	116
Duskmourn: House of Horror	expansion symbol	Stylized moth	DSK	Swimming	September 20–26, 2024	September 27, 2024	286	91	100	60	20	15	131
Six-set Model
Aetherdrift	expansion symbol	A checkered flag	DFT	Tennis	February 7, 2025	February 14, 2025	291	91	100	60	20	20	10
Tarkir: Dragonstorm	expansion symbol	A dragonstorm	TDM	Ultimate	April 4, 2025	April 11, 2025	286	91	100	60	20	20	
Final Fantasy	expansion symbol	"FF" beside a 12-sided crystal	FIN	(none)	June 6, 2025	June 13, 2025	309	90	110	74	20	15	64
Edge of Eternities	expansion symbol	A black hole	EOE	Volleyball	July 25, 2025	August 1, 2025	276	81	100	60	20	15	175
Marvel's Spider-Man	expansion symbol	A circular Spider-Man Mask	SPM	TBA	September 19, 2025	September 26, 2025	198	65	55	53	15	10	88
Avatar: The Last Airbender	expansion symbol	Avatar Aang's face	TLA	TBA	November 14, 2025	November 21, 2025	286	96	110	60	20	15	98
Lorwyn Eclipsed	expansion symbol	A partial solar eclipse	ECL	Wrestling	January 16, 2026	January 23, 2026	273	86	100	65	22	15	-
Teenage Mutant Ninja Turtles	expansion symbol	Teenage Mutant Ninja Turtle Face	TMT	TBA	February 27, 2026	March 6, 2026	195	61	55	53	21	15	-
Secrets of Strixhaven	expansion symbol	A stylised owl head	SOS	Yachting	April 17, 2026	April 24, 2026	276	86	100	60	20	15	-
Marvel Super Heroes	expansion symbol	A comic book with an M	MSH	TBA	June 19, 2026	June 26, 2026	276	91	100	60	25	15	-
The Hobbit	expansion symbol	Sting in front of the One Ring	HOB	TBA	August 7, 2026	August 14, 2026	193	70	55	53	15	10	-
Reality Fracture	expansion symbol	Jace Beleren's face half in shadow	FRA	Ziplining	September 25, 2026	October 2, 2026	285	86	109	65	29	-	-
Star Trek		Star Trek's Starfleet delta	TRK	TBA	November 6, 2026	November 13, 2026	TBA						
Nauctis: The Sunken Realm		TBA	TBA	Amsterdam	TBA	February 5, 2027	TBA						
Marvel Darkhold Destiny		TBA	MDD	TBA	TBA	April 9, 2027	TBA						
Kamigawa: Titanbreach		TBA	TBA	Berlin	TBA	June 4, 2027	TBA						
Unnamed Universes Beyond Set		TBA	TBA	TBA	TBA	TBA	TBA						
Zhalfir		TBA	TBA	Cairo	TBA	October 1, 2027	TBA						
Unnamed Universes Beyond Set		TBA	TBA	TBA	TBA	TBA	TBA						
TBA		TBA	TBA	Dublin	TBA	TBA	TBA						
TBA		TBA	TBA	Edmonton	TBA	TBA	TBA						
TBA		TBA	TBA	Fuji	TBA	TBA	TBA						
TBA		TBA	TBA	Giza	TBA	TBA	TBA						
Set	Expansion symbol	Expansion symbol description	Expansion code	Development codename	Pre-release date	Release date	Size						
Set	Expansion symbol	Expansion symbol description	Expansion code	Development codename	Pre-release date	Release date	Total Cards	Common	Uncommon	Rare	Mythic Rare	Basic Land	Other

== Other sets ==
=== Modern-legal sets ===
These sets are legal in large non-rotating formats including Modern or Legacy, but not Standard.

They are not legal in the Pioneer format, a smaller non-rotating format.

Set	Expansion symbol description	Expansion code	Development codename	Release date	Size						
Set	Expansion symbol description	Expansion code	Development codename	Release date	Total cards	Common	Uncommon	Rare	Mythic Rare	Basic Land	Other
Modern Horizons	Modern Masters symbol coming over a horizon	MH1	Contemporary	June 14, 2019	254	101	80	53	15	5	1
Modern Horizons 2	Two Modern Horizons symbols overlapping	MH2	Decadent	June 18, 2021	313	101	100	78	24	10	3
The Lord of the Rings: Tales of Middle-earth	The One Ring on a triangle	LTR	Anvil	June 23, 2023	281	101	80	60	20	20	17
Assassin’s Creed	Assassin insignia	ACR		July 5, 2024	138	10	64	44	16	10	
Modern Horizons 3	Eldrazi symbol coming over a horizon	MH3		June 14, 2024	303	80	101	60	20	5	

=== Introductory sets ===
These introductory sets were intended for novice Magic: The Gathering players. They were illegal in sanctioned tournaments until October 2005, when they became legal in Legacy and Vintage.

Set	Expansion symbol description	Expansion code	Release date	Size						
Set	Expansion symbol description	Expansion code	Release date	Total cards	Common	Uncommon	Rare	Mythic Rare	Basic Land	Other
Portal^{[XIX]}
Portal	A portal	POR	June 1997	222^{[XX]}	90	57	55	—	20	—
Portal Second Age	A pentagon	P02	June 1998	165	70	45	35	—	15	—
Portal Three Kingdoms	The Chinese character for the number 3	PTK	May 1999	180	55	55	55	—	15	—
Starter
Starter 1999	A five-pointed star	S99	July 1999	173	63	55	35	—	20	—
Starter 2000	None	S00	July 2000	57^{[XXI]}	39	6	2	—	10	—
Global Series
Global Series: Jiang Yanggu & Mu Yanling	A mountain	GS1	June 22, 2018	Two 60-card decks						

=== Compilations/reprint sets ===
Reprint sets are sets of certain cards from previous sets that were re-released for different reasons. Some reasons include the cards were fan favorites and popular demand brought them back or in some cases, reprints were to commemorate certain events such as widely known matches or anniversary sets. Some reprint sets revolved around a certain theme; for example, Beatdown was themed around old, out-of-print, heavy-hitting creatures. Reprinting a card in one of these sets does not affect when it leaves Standard.

Deck Builder's Toolkits are released at the same time as a core set and contain only cards from sets that are legal in Standard at that time; they are not sets as such. These boxed sets therefore have no symbol or code of their own.

Set	Expansion symbol description	Expansion code	Release date	Size						
Set	Expansion symbol description	Expansion code	Release date	Total cards	Common	Uncommon	Rare	Mythic Rare	Basic Land	Other
Chronicles^{[XVII]}	No specific symbol^{[XVIII]}	CHR	July 1995	125^{[XVII]}	37	43	45	—	—	—
Rivals Quick Start Set^{[XXXVII]}	No specific symbol	none	July 1996	Four pre-constructed decks						
Multiverse Gift Box	No specific symbol	none	November 1996	Boosters from various sets in various languages						
Anthologies	No specific symbol	ATH	November 1998	Two 60-card pre-constructed decks						
Battle Royale Box Set	No specific symbol	BRB	November 12, 1999	Four 40-card pre-constructed decks						
Beatdown Box Set	A mace	BTD	December 2000	Two 61-card pre-constructed decks						
Deckmasters: Garfield vs. Finkel	A stylized letter "D"	DKM	September 17, 2001	Two 62-card pre-constructed decks						
Premium Foil Booster	Alara block symbols	none	January 8, 2010	539 foil cards from the Alara block^{[XXXV]}						
Duels of the Planeswalkers (decks)	A stylized letter "M" inside a circle	DPA	June 4, 2010	Five 60-card decks						
Modern Event Deck	Three-pronged object	MD1	May 30, 2014	60-card deck, 15-card sideboard						
Mystery Booster	No specific symbol	MB1	March 13, 2020	1694	1060	452	152	30	—	—
Time Spiral Remastered	Tilted hourglass	TSR	March 19, 2021	289	121	100	53	15	—	122
Dominaria Remastered	The skyship Weatherlight, seen from the front	DMR	January 13, 2023	271	101	80	60	20	10	196
Ravnica Remastered	A row of Ravnican buildings	RVR	January 12, 2024							
Innistrad Remastered		INR	January 24, 2025							
Mystery Booster 2		MB2	August 19, 2024							
International sets
Renaissance (French/German)	—N/a	—N/a	August 1995	122	51	40	31	—	—	—
Rinascimento (Italian)	—N/a	—N/a	August 1995	69	?	?	?	—	—	—
Duel Decks
Duel Decks: Elves vs. Goblins	A stylized axe and bow combination symbol	EVG	November 16, 2007	Two 60-card pre-constructed decks						
Duel Decks: Jace vs. Chandra	A point-reflected pair of swooshes	DD2	November 7, 2008	Two 60-card pre-constructed decks						
Duel Decks: Divine vs. Demonic	A halo with horns coming up through its center	DDC	April 10, 2009	Two 60-card pre-constructed decks						
Duel Decks: Garruk vs. Liliana	A leaf inside a semicircle	DDD	October 30, 2009	Two 60-card pre-constructed decks						
Duel Decks: Phyrexia vs. the Coalition	Yawgmoth's and the Coalition's symbols combined	DDE	March 19, 2010	Two 60-card pre-constructed decks						
Duel Decks: Elspeth vs. Tezzeret	Two trapezoids with parts missing	DDF	September 3, 2010	Two 60-card pre-constructed decks						
Duel Decks: Knights vs. Dragons	A shield in the shape of a dragon in flight	DDG	April 1, 2011	Two 60-card pre-constructed decks						
Duel Decks: Ajani vs. Nicol Bolas	Nicol Bolas' horns superimposed on Ajani's axe-head	DDH	September 2, 2011	Two 60-card pre-constructed decks						
Duel Decks: Venser vs. Koth	Two nearly-interlocking zigzags	DDI	March 30, 2012	Two 60-card pre-constructed decks						
Duel Decks: Izzet vs. Golgari	Combination of Izzet and Golgari symbols	DDJ	September 7, 2012	Two 60-card pre-constructed decks						
Duel Decks: Sorin vs. Tibalt	Combination of stylized sword and devil horns	DDK	March 15, 2013	Two 60-card pre-constructed decks						
Duel Decks: Heroes vs. Monsters	Combination axe, helmet, and wings	DDL	September 6, 2013	Two 60-card pre-constructed decks						
Duel Decks: Jace vs. Vraska	Arcane symbol and gorgon tentacle	DDM	March 14, 2014	Two 60-card pre-constructed decks						
Duel Decks: Speed vs. Cunning	Winged eye	DDN	September 5, 2014	Two 60-card pre-constructed decks						
Duel Decks Anthology	—N/a	DD3	December 5, 2014	A reprint of the first four Duel Deck sets						
Duel Decks: Elspeth vs. Kiora	Godsend (Elspeth's spear) and waves	DDO	February 27, 2015	Two 60-card pre-constructed decks						
Duel Decks: Zendikar vs. Eldrazi	Half-hedron and Eldrazi tentacle	DDP	August 28, 2015	Two 60-card pre-constructed decks						
Duel Decks: Blessed vs. Cursed	Demon wing and half of Avacyn's collar	DDQ	February 26, 2016	Two 60-card pre-constructed decks						
Duel Decks: Nissa vs. Ob Nixilis	Hedron and horns	DDR	September 2, 2016	Two 60-card pre-constructed decks						
Duel Decks: Mind vs. Might	Stylized knotwork	DDS	March 31, 2017	Two 60-card pre-constructed decks						
Duel Decks: Merfolk vs. Goblins	Combined trident and axe heads	DDT	November 10, 2017	Two 60-card pre-constructed decks						
Duel Decks: Elves vs. Inventors	Bow and arrow superimposed on gear	DDU	April 6, 2018	Two 60-card pre-constructed decks						
From the Vault
From the Vault: Dragons	Wings of a Dragon	DRB	August 29, 2008	15 limited foil dragon cards						
From the Vault: Exiled	An arrow firing diagonally leaving a trail	V09	August 28, 2009	15 limited foil formerly banned cards						
From the Vault: Relics	An orb on a stand	V10	August 27, 2010	15 limited foil artifact cards						
From the Vault: Legends	A crown	V11	August 26, 2011	15 limited foil legendary creature cards						
From the Vault: Realms	Mountain and sunrise	V12	August 31, 2012	15 limited foil land cards						
From the Vault: Twenty	Numeral 20 in a circle	V13	August 23, 2013	20 limited foil cards						
From the Vault: Annihilation	Stylized bomb or fractured orb	V14	August 22, 2014	15 limited foil cards						
From the Vault: Angels	Stylized angel wings	V15	August 21, 2015	15 limited foil cards						
From the Vault: Lore	Scroll unrolling to become castle tower	V16	August 19, 2016	15 limited foil cards and one token						
From the Vault: Transform	Dark planet with lighting on the top or bottom depending on which side of the card is viewed	V17	November 24, 2017	15 limited foil double-faced cards						
Signature Spellbook
Signature Spellbook: Jace	Spellbook	SS1	June 15, 2018	9 cards						
Signature Spellbook: Gideon	Gideon's sural and shield in front of an open book	SS2	June 28, 2019	9 cards						
Signature Spellbook: Chandra	Flame in front of an open book	SS3	June 26, 2020	9 cards						
Premium Deck Series
Premium Deck Series: Slivers	A coiled sliver / A sliver claw	H09	November 20, 2009	60-card premium foil deck						
Premium Deck Series: Fire and Lightning	A flame and lightning bolt	PD2	November 19, 2010	60-card premium foil deck						
Premium Deck Series: Graveborn	A human skull	PD3	November 18, 2011	60-card premium foil deck						
Masters Series
Modern Masters	A stylized City of Brass	MMA	June 7, 2013	229	101	60	53	15	—	—
Modern Masters 2015 Edition	The City of Brass symbol rotated and then mirrored	MM2	May 22, 2015	249	101	80	53	15	—	—
Eternal Masters	Hourglass made from two City of Brass symbols	EMA	June 10, 2016	249	101	80	53	15	—	—
Modern Masters 2017 Edition	Floating "U" over crown	MM3	March 17, 2017	249	101	80	53	15	—	—
Iconic Masters	Stylized letters I and M.	IMA	November 17, 2017	249	101	80	53	15	—	—
Masters 25	The number 25 over the planeswalker symbol	A25	March 16, 2018	249	101	80	53	15	—	—
Ultimate Masters	Infinity symbol made out of two stylized skulls	UMA	December 7, 2018	254	101	80	53	20	—	—
Double Masters	A diamond on top of an X	2XM	August 7, 2020	332	91	80	121	40	—	—
Double Masters 2022 Edition	A double X on top of a diamond	2X2	July 8, 2022	332	91	80	120	40	—	1
Commander Masters	Shield with elongated hexagon	CMM	August 4, 2023	436	171	218	277	70	?	?
Deck Builder's Toolkits
Deck Builder's Toolkit	No specific set symbol	w10	May 21, 2010	Box set of 285 semi-randomized cards and 4 booster packs from recent editions						
Deck Builder's Toolkit (Refreshed Version)	No specific set symbol	w11	March 11, 2011	Box set of 285 semi-randomized cards and 4 booster packs from recent editions						
Deck Builder's Toolkit (2012 Edition)	No specific set symbol	w12	July 13, 2012	Box set of 285 semi-randomized cards and 4 booster packs from recent editions						
Deck Builder's Toolkit (2014 Core Set Edition)	No specific set symbol	w14	July 19, 2013	Box set of 285 semi-randomized cards and 4 booster packs from recent editions						
Deck Builder's Toolkit (2015 Core Set Edition)	No specific set symbol	w15	July 18, 2014	Box set of 285 semi-randomized cards and 4 booster packs from recent editions						
Deck Builder's Toolkit (Magic Origins Edition)	Planeswalker symbol breaking through the horizon	ORI	July 17, 2015	Box set of 285 semi-randomized cards and 4 booster packs from recent editions						
Deck Builder's Toolkit (Shadows over Innistrad Edition)	Star with trail and "16"	w16	April 8, 2016	Box set of 285 semi-randomized cards and 4 booster packs from recent editions						
Deck Builder's Toolkit (Amonkhet Edition)	Star with trail and "17"	w17	April 28, 2017	Box set of 285 semi-randomized cards and 4 booster packs from recent editions						
Deck Builder's Toolkit (Ixalan Edition)	Star with trail and "17"	w17	September 29, 2017	Box set of 285 semi-randomized cards and 4 booster packs from recent editions						
Deck Builder's Toolkit (Core 2019 Edition)	—N/a	—N/a	July 13, 2018	Box set of 285 fixed cards and 4 booster packs from recent editions						
Deck Builder's Toolkit (Ravnica Allegiance Edition)	—N/a	—N/a	January 25, 2019	Box set of 285 fixed cards and 4 booster packs from recent editions						
Deck Builder's Toolkit (Core Set 2020 Edition)	—N/a	—N/a	July 12, 2019	Box set of 285 fixed cards and 4 booster packs from recent editions						
Deck Builder's Toolkit (Theros Beyond Death Edition)	—N/a	—N/a	January 24, 2020	Box set of 285 fixed cards and 4 booster packs from recent editions						
(Holiday) Gift Boxes
2012 Holiday Gift Box	—N/a	—N/a	November 16, 2012	4 Boosters, 20 basic lands, 1 foil alternate-art card from Return to Ravnica (Dreg Mangler), 6 illustrated plastic dividers + stickers for customizing the dividers						
2013 Holiday Gift Box	—N/a	—N/a	November 15, 2013	4 Boosters, 20 basic lands, 1 foil alternate-art card from Theros (Karametra's Acolyte), 6 illustrated plastic dividers + stickers for customizing the dividers						
2014 Holiday Gift Box	—N/a	—N/a	November 14, 2014	4 Boosters, 20 basic lands, 1 foil alternate-art card from Khans of Tarkir (Sultai Charm), 6 illustrated plastic dividers + stickers for customizing the dividers						
2015 Holiday Gift Box	—N/a	—N/a	November 6, 2015	5 Boosters, 20 basic lands, 1 foil alternate-art card from Battle for Zendikar (Scythe Leopard), 6 illustrated plastic dividers + stickers for customizing the dividers						
Shadows over Innistrad: The Gift Box	—N/a	—N/a	May 13, 2016	5 Boosters, 20 basic lands, 1 foil alternate-art card from Shadows over Innistrad (Ravenous Bloodseeker), 6 illustrated plastic dividers + stickers for customizing the dividers						
Kaladesh: The Gift Box	—N/a	—N/a		5 Boosters, 20 basic lands, 1 foil alternate-art card from Kaladesh (Chief of the Foundry), 6 illustrated plastic dividers + stickers for customizing the dividers						
Throne of Eldraine Bundle Gift Edition	—N/a	—N/a	November 15, 2019	1 Collector Booster; 1 special oversized Spindown life counter; 10 Throne of Eldraine Draft Booster packs; 20 regular basic lands; 20 foil basic lands; 1 foil alt-art bundle promo card						

==== Masterpiece Series ====
Starting with the Kaladesh block, some sets include the Masterpiece Series. Wizards of the coast has stated "the Masterpiece Series... began with Zendikar Expeditions". They were retroactively added with the announcement of Kaladesh Inventions. Cards in the Masterpiece Series appear at a higher rarity than Mythic Rares, and consist of either reprints, or cards from the set whose packs they appear in. However, they are not considered part of that set, and instead get their own expansion symbol; moreover, as with reprint sets (see below), printing in a Masterpiece Series entry does not affect format legality. Note that entries in the Masterpiece Series do not have expansion codes, except for Zendikar Expeditions, which has code "EXP".

The Guilds of Ravnica Mythic Edition is a package that is sold exclusively on Hasbro's website. It contains 24 Guilds of Ravnica packs, 8 of which contain a predetermined Masterpiece card.

On January 10, 2019, the Ravnica Allegiance Mythic Edition was announced. Unlike the Guilds of Ravnica version, the Ravnica Allegiance Mythic Edition was sold on eBay and shipped globally. It contains 24 Ravnica Allegiance packs, 8 of which contain a predetermined Masterpiece card.

The set codes listed below come from the 3-letter code printed on the card frames at the bottom.

Block/set	Set	Code	Expansion symbol	Release date	Total cards	Cards in first set	Cards in second set
Battle for Zendikar	Zendikar Expeditions	EXP	Hedron with base	September 26, 2015	45	25	20
Kaladesh	Kaladesh Inventions	MPS	Column or letter π made of aether	September 24, 2016	54	30	24
Amonkhet	Amonkhet Invocations	MP2	Nicol Bolas' head shape	April 28, 2017	54	30	24
Guilds of Ravnica	Guilds of Ravnica Mythic Edition	MED	Planeswalker symbol in front of a shield	October 3, 2018	8	8	N/A
Ravnica Allegiance	Ravnica Allegiance Mythic Edition	MED	Planeswalker symbol in front of a shield	January 24, 2019	8	8	N/A
War of the Spark	War of the Spark Mythic Edition	MED	Planeswalker symbol in front of a shield	May 1, 2019	8	8	N/A
Strixhaven	Strixhaven Mystical Archive	STA	A scroll	April 23, 2021	63	63	N/A
The Brothers' War	The Brothers' War Retro Artifacts	BRR	Gear-shaped symbol with diamond in the middle	November 18, 2022	63	63	N/A
March of the Machine	Multiverse Legends	MUL	Wings surrounding a Phyrexian invasion portal	April 21, 2023	65	65	N/A
Wilds of Eldraine	Enchanting Tales	WOT	A diamond encircled by a spell wave	September 8, 2023	63	63	N/A
Outlaws of Thunder Junction	Breaking News	OTP	A jail door	April 19, 2024	65	65	N/A
Final Fantasy	Final Fantasy: Through the Ages	FCA	N/A	June 13, 2025	64	64	N/A
Edge of Eternities	Edge of Eternities: Stellar Sights	EOS	N/A	August 1, 2025	45	45	N/A

==== Collector Booster Packs ====
Starting with the Ravnica Allegiance expansion, collector packs started. Wizards of the Coast also had collector packs (premium packs) in Shards of Alara, but no sets after that until Ravnica Allegiance. Collector packs in Throne of Eldraine consist of five to six foil commons, three to four foil uncommons, three alternate art cards, one card from supplemental sets (from the Brawl deck series or planeswalker deck exclusive cards), one rare or mythic rare, one extended art rare or mythic rare, one foil rare or mythic rare, and a foil double faced token. Theros Beyond Death collector boosters consist of four to five foil commons, two to three foil uncommons, two full art foil basic lands, one card from supplemental sets (Theros Beyond Death planeswalker deck exclusive cards), one rare or mythic rare, one foil rare or mythic rare, two alternate art "Constellation" cards, and a foil double faced token.

==== Jumpstart Booster Packs ====
Set	Set symbol	Set code	Pre-release date	Release date	Size						
Set	Set symbol	Set code	Pre-release date	Release date	Total cards	Common	Uncommon	Rare	Mythic Rare	Basic Land	Other
Jumpstart	Two cards linked together with a circle around them	JMP	July 16, 2020	July 17, 2020	495	197	154	87	17	40	—
Jumpstart 2022	Two half decks in an oval	J22	December 1, 2022	December 2, 2022	819						—
Foundations Jumpstart	Two cards spinning into each other	J25		November 15, 2024							

==== Secret Lair ====
Secret Lairs are sold directly to the public by Wizards of the Coast, beginning in 2019. Most Secret Lair cards are themed reprints in a new art style or with a new intellectual property attached to it, but others have been mechanically unique cards.

The first Secret Lair series all consisted of alternate art reprints. Wizards of the Coast was trying to work with artists they usually didn't: street artists, comic book artists, album cover designers, etc. In 2022, Wizards experimented with mechanically unique cards attached to new IPs with cards themed with The Walking Dead franchise. In general, these "Universes Beyond" crossovers have proven very popular. Wizards has also published "Universes Within" reprints of cards originally released in Universes Beyond with the same gameplay mechanics, but flavored in MTG settings and with new names.

Most Secret Lair exclusive cards are legal in the Vintage and Legacy formats (and thus Commander by extension).

=== Multiplayer-focused sets ===
Starting with Planechase in 2009, Wizards of the Coast has occasionally printed sets intended primarily for multiplayer play, which do not necessarily consist entirely of reprints but are not legal in Standard; a card printed in one of these is legal only in Eternal formats, and reprinting a card in one of these sets does not affect when it leaves Standard. These sets usually consist of fixed decks.

Set	Expansion symbol	Expansion code	Release date	Size							New cards
Set	Expansion symbol	Expansion code	Release date	Total cards	Common	Uncommon	Rare	Mythic Rare	Basic Land	Other	New cards
Planechase
Planechase	Two planes represented by circular arcs, the lower with three upper spikes	HOP	September 4, 2009	Four 60-card decks + 40 plane cards							0
Planechase 2012 Edition	Two planes represented by circular arcs, the upper with three bites removed from bottom	PC2	June 1, 2012	Four 60-card decks and 40 plane or phenomenon cards							21
Planechase Anthology	Two planes represented by circular arcs, the upper with five upper spikes	PCA	November 25, 2016	Four 60-card decks and 86 plane or phenomenon cards							0
Archenemy
Archenemy	A trident	ARC	June 18, 2010	Four decks, each with 60 cards and 20 oversized scheme cards							0
Archenemy: Nicol Bolas	Nicol's horns with orb	E01	June 16, 2017	Four 60-card decks, four planeswalker cards, and one 20-card scheme deck							0
Commander
Commander 2011	Three prongs symbolizing the "wedge" coloration	CMD	June 17, 2011	Five 100-card decks each with 3 oversized foil Commander cards							51
Commander's Arsenal	3-part gem	CM1	November 2, 2012	28 foil cards (18 regular, 10 oversized)							0
Commander 2013 Edition	3-part gem with hooks	C13	November 1, 2013	Five 100-card decks each with 3 oversized foil Commander cards							51
Commander 2014	Shield-shaped 3-part gem	C14	November 7, 2014	Five 100-card decks each with 1 oversized foil Commander card							61
Commander 2015	2-part shield	C15	November 13, 2015	Five 100-card decks each with 1 oversized foil Commander card							56
Commander 2016	Shield with a sword	C16	November 11, 2016	Five 100-card decks each with 1 oversized foil Commander card							56
Commander Anthology	Shield with crown	CMA	June 9, 2017	Four 100-card decks each with 1 oversized foil Commander card							0
Commander 2017	Shield with 4 parts	C17	August 25, 2017	Four 100-card decks each with 1 oversized foil Commander card							56
Commander Anthology Volume II	Shield and swords upon a amphora	CM2	June 8, 2018	Four 100-card decks each with 1 oversized foil Commander card							0
Commander 2018	Shield with horizontal lightning bolt symbol	C18	August 10, 2018	Four 100-card decks each with 1 oversized foil Commander card							59
Commander 2019	Shield with descending ribbon and two etchings	C19	August 23, 2019	Four 100-card decks each with 1 oversized foil Commander card							59
Commander 2020 / Ikoria Commander	Shield with thorns	C20	May 15, 2020	Five 100-card decks each set on the plane of Ikoria							71
Zendikar Rising Commander	Split shield with hedron inserts	ZNC	September 25, 2020	Two 100-card decks each set on the plane of Zendikar Rising							6
Commander Legends	Shield combining elements of the Legends expansion symbol in the lower part, and the legendary card frame in the upper part	CMR	November 20, 2020	The Innovation Product for 2020, Commander Legends is the first Commander set designed to be drafted. It includes 361 total cards. Of these, 165 are new cards, including 71 new legendary creatures and planeswalkers.							165
Kaldheim Commander	Shield behind stylised axe head	KHC	February 2, 2021	Two 100-card decks set on the plane of Kaldheim							16
Commander 2021 / Strixhaven Commander	Shield with six inlays	C21	April 23, 2021	Five 100-card decks each associated with a school of Strixhaven							81
Forgotten Realms Commander	Shield behind dragon head	AFC	July 23, 2021	Four 100-card decks set in the D&D region of the Forgotten Realms							62
Midnight Hunt Commander	Shield with claw marks	MIC	September 24, 2021	Two 100-card decks set on the plane of Innistrad							38
Crimson Vow Commander	Shield with two vampire fangs	VOC	November 19, 2021	Two 100-card decks set on the plane of Innistrad							38
Neon Dynasty Commander	Futuristic angular shield / Origami shield	NEC	February 18, 2022	Two 100-card decks set on the futuristic plane of Kamigawa							38
New Capenna Commander	Shield behind angel wings	NCC	April 29, 2022	Five 100-card decks each associated with a New Capenna crime family							93
Battle for Baldur's Gate / Commander Legends 2	Shield behind hexagon	CLB	June 10, 2022	Following on from the success of Commander Legends, Battle for Baldur's Gate is the second Commander set designed to be drafted. It includes 361 cards, of which 344 are new cards including 69 new legendary creatures and planeswalkers.							344
Warhammer 40,000 Commander	Skull in front of angel wings	40K	October 7, 2022	The first cross-over from Universes Beyond legal set in MTG. Legal in Commander, Vintage and Legacy. It features 321 cards and 168 cards that are not reprints.							321
The Brothers' War Commander	Gear inside a shield	BRC	November 18, 2022	There are two decks in total, with every card in the decks featuring the retro frame treatment. Each deck is helmed by the two brothers Urza and Mishra, with new cards specifically designed for the Commander format. Legal in Commander, Vintage and Legacy. It features 176 cards and 28 cards that are not reprints.							176
Wilds of Eldraine Commander	The back of an open book with a diamond across the spine	WOC	September 8, 2023	There are two decks in total, "Virtue And Valor" and "Fae Dominion".							26
The Lost Caverns of Ixalan Commander	A stylised compass rose	LCC	November 17, 2023	Four 100-card decks: "Ahoy Mateys", "Blood Rites", "Explorers of the Deep", and "Veloci-ramp-tor".							48
Murders at Karlov Manor Commander	Shield behind a cinquedea short sword	MKC	February 9, 2024	Four 100-card decks: "Deadly Disguise", "Revenant Recon", "Deep Clue Sea", and "Blame Game".							40
Outlaws of Thunder Junction Commander	Shield behind a cowboy hat	OTC	April 19, 2024	Four 100-card decks: "Quick Draw", "Desert Bloom", "Grand Larceny", and "Most Wanted".							40
Modern Horizons 3 Commander	Shield behind an Eldrazi symbol	M3C	June 14, 2024	Four 100-card decks: "Tricky Terrain", "Graveyard Overdrive", "Creative Energy", and "Eldrazi Incursion". Collector's Edition Commander decks were also debuted for this set, with a variant for all four decks.							60
Bloomburrow Commander	A flower stylised in the shape of a shield	BLC	August 2, 2024	Four 100-card decks: "Animated Army", "Family Matters", "Peace Offering", and "Squirreled Away".							40
Duskmourn: House of Horror Commander	A moth on a plaque	DSC	September 27, 2024	Four 100-card decks: "Miracle Worker", "Death Toll", "Jump Scare!", and "Endless Punishment".							40
Foundations Commander	A pentagon resembling a gemstone	FDC	November 15, 2024	This set contains only a total of three cards: Arcane Signet, Sol Ring, and Command Tower. These Commander staples are not present in the Foundations set itself and are only obtainable through the Foundations Starter Collection.							0
Aetherdrift Commander	A shield with a chequered pattern	DRC	February 14, 2025	Two 100-card decks: "Living Energy" and "Eternal Might"							20
Tarkir: Dragonstorm Commander	A forward-facing dragon head with wings on either side	TDC	April 11, 2025	Five 100-card decks each associated with a clan of Tarkir: "Abzan Armor", "Jeskai Striker", "Sultai Arisen", "Mardu Surge", and "Temur Roar".							50
Final Fantasy Commander	A Chocobo	FIC	June 13, 2025	Four 100-card decks: "Revival Trance", "Limit Break", "Counter Blitz", and "Scions & Spellcraft". Collector's Edition variants exist for all four decks.							100
Edge of Eternities Commander	A black hole inside a shield	EOC	August 1, 2025	Two 100-card decks: "World Shaper" and "Counter Intelligence".							24
Lorwyn Eclipsed Commander	A partial eclipse within a shield	ECC	January 23, 2026	Two 100-card decks: "Dance of the Elements" and "Blight Curse".							24
Secrets of Strixhaven Commander	A shield made of parchment containing five symbols representing each school of Strixhaven	SOC	April 24, 2026	Five 100-card decks each associated with a school of Strixhaven: "Witherbloom Pestilence", "Silverquill Influence", "Quandrix Unlimited", "Lorehold Spirit", and "Prismari Artistry".							60
Marvel Super Heroes Commander	An open comicbook with "M" and numerous panels	MSC	June 26, 2026	Four 100-card decks: "Doom Prevails", "The Fantastic Four", "Wakanda Forever", and "Avengers Assemble". Collector's Edition variants exist for all four decks.							120
Reality Fracture Commander	The staff of Jace Beleren placed in a shield	RFC	October 2, 2026	One 100-card deck "Multiverse Reforged" representing Jace's role in the storyline of Reality Fracture.							18
Conspiracy
Conspiracy	Seal	CNS	June 6, 2014	210^{[XXXII]}	89	68	43	10	—	—	65
Conspiracy: Take the Crown	Seal of the Black Rose	CN2	August 26, 2016	221	90	67	50	14	—	—	80
Other sets
Explorers of Ixalan	Ship's wheel	E02	November 24, 2017	Four 60-card decks and various game components							0
Battlebond	Two connected figures in front of a diamond shape	BBD	June 8, 2018	254							85

=== Non-DCI-sanctioned-tournament-play-legal sets ===
These sets, though also published by Wizards of the Coast, are not legal for DCI-sanctioned tournament play.

Set	Expansion symbol	Expansion code	Pre-release date	Release date	Size						
Set	Expansion symbol	Expansion code	Pre-release date	Release date	Total cards	Common	Uncommon	Rare	Mythic Rare	Basic Land	Other
Collector's Edition	no symbol^{[XXXIII]}	CED	—N/a	December 1993	363	75	95	117	—	76	—
International Collector's Edition	no symbol^{[XXXIV]}	CEI	—N/a	December 1993	363	75	95	117	—	76	—
Astral^{[XXII]}	star with a trail	—N/a	—N/a	April 1997	12	—	—	—	—	—	—
Un-sets^{[XXIII]}
Unglued	A cracked-open egg	UGL	August 7, 1998	August 17, 1998	94	38	28	28	—	5	—
Unhinged	A horseshoe	UNH	November 20, 2004	November 19, 2004	141	55	40	40	—	5	1^{[XXIV]}
Unstable	A wrench with an acorn-shaped hole	UST	—N/a	December 8, 2017	268^{[XXXVI]}	102^{[XXXVI]}	90^{[XXXVI]}	61^{[XXXVI]}	15	5	—
Unsanctioned	A horseshoe in half of a cracked-open egg over two crossed wrenches with acorn-shaped holes	UND	—N/a	February 28, 2020	96	30	22	30	4	10	—
Unfinity	An atom	UNF	—N/a	October 7, 2022	638	232	198	156	52	26	—
Pro Tour/World Championship Decks
Pro Tour Collector Set Inaugural Edition	—N/a	—N/a	—N/a	May 1996	Eight 60-card pre-constructed decks (720 cards total due to sideboards and additional inserts)						
World Championship Decks 1997	—N/a	—N/a	—N/a	1997	Four 60-card pre-constructed decks						
World Championship Decks 1998	—N/a	—N/a	—N/a	1998	Four 60-card pre-constructed decks						
World Championship Decks 1999	—N/a	—N/a	—N/a	1999	Four 60-card pre-constructed decks						
World Championship Decks 2000	—N/a	—N/a	—N/a	2000	Four 60-card pre-constructed decks						
World Championship Decks 2001	—N/a	—N/a	—N/a	2001	Four 60-card pre-constructed decks						
World Championship Decks 2002	—N/a	—N/a	—N/a	2002	Four 60-card pre-constructed decks						
World Championship Decks 2003	—N/a	—N/a	—N/a	2003	Four 60-card pre-constructed decks						
World Championship Decks 2004	—N/a	—N/a	—N/a	2004	Four 60-card pre-constructed decks						

=== Magic: The Gathering Online exclusive sets ===
These sets are exclusive to Magic: The Gathering Online.

Set	Expansion symbol	Expansion code	Release date	Size						
Set	Expansion symbol	Expansion code	Release date	Total cards	Common	Uncommon	Rare	Mythic Rare	Basic Land	Other
Masters Editions
Masters Edition	A circle and a quarter-circle	MED	September 10, 2007	195	60	60	60	—	15	—
Masters Edition II	A circle and two quarter-circles	ME2	September 22, 2008	245	80	80	80	—	5	—
Masters Edition III	A circle behind two quarter-circles	ME3	September 7, 2009	230	75	70	70	—	15	—
Masters Edition IV	4 quarter-circles forming an hourglass	ME4	January 10, 2011	269	80	72	105	—	12	—
Vintage Masters	Helmet with a V-shaped pattern	VMA	June 16, 2014	325	101	80	105	30	—	9
Tempest Remastered	Arch broken by lightning bolt	TPR	May 6, 2015	269	101	80	53	15	20	—
Magic: The Gathering Online Deck Series
Magic Online Deck Series: Legacy Format	—N/a	—N/a	November 8, 2010	Two 60-card decks with 15 card sideboards						
Momir Vig Basic Event Deck	—N/a	—N/a	November 22, 2010	Deck with 1 avatar card & 60 basic lands						

== Notes ==
^I: Two cards, the common Circle of Protection: Black and the rare Volcanic Island, were inadvertently left out of the printing of Alpha. Beta and Unlimited included the two missing cards as well as one additional alternate art variant of each of the five basic lands. Consequently, those two sets each have seven more cards than Alpha did.
^II: When the Revised Edition was in production in 1994, a number of problems with the set became apparent. Some cards' colors were washed-out. The picture and color foreground for the Serendib Efreet were wrong (not that this was the first such misprint), and there was a growing concern with the Satanic images on some of the cards. The solution was to print a "fixed" version of Revised Edition, code named "Edgar", which has since came to be known as Summer Magic because it was printed in the summer of 1994. The cards were distributed in regular Revised Edition boosters, but no Summer Edition starters were produced. Despite its intended function as a fixed Revised Edition, there were problems with Summer Magic. On some cards, the colors were too dark. Furthermore, Hurricane was printed as a blue card and thereby became the most famous and most desired Summer Magic card of all. The Serendib Efreet had its artwork corrected, but the artist name was still wrong, as was that of Plateau (which had, uniquely out of the cards in Revised, received new art, but not an updated artist credit to reflect that). Because of all these flaws, the entire print run was recalled and destroyed which led to Revised Edition shortage in 1994. However, a few booster boxes survived. Summer Magic cards can sell for over $1000 for notable cards and some as high $5000. Summer Magic cards can best be recognized by their 1994 copyright date.
^III: The only cards in Fifth Edition to have an expansion symbol were those printed in Simplified Chinese in 1998.
^IV: In addition to the 350 cards normally available in booster packs, the Eighth Edition Core Game contained 7 "starter cards" not available in booster packs, labeled with collector numbers S1 through S7; 3 were marked common, 3 uncommon, and 1 rare. Ninth Edition contained 9, labeled S1 through S10 (omitting S6); 6 were marked common, 2 uncommon, and 1 rare. These were meant to introduce new players to the game; most were "vanilla" creatures. Similarly, Magic 2015 contained 15 starter cards not contained in booster packs; 6 were marked common, 4 uncommon, and 5 rare. Magic Origins contained 16 such cards.
^V: 14 of the commons were printed in two subtle variations (called "a" and "b") making 92 total cards but only 78 unique cards.
^VI: 5 of the cards came in 4 alternate art versions making the set have 100 total cards but only 85 unique cards. The different art versions also differ in rarity causing these 5 cards to make up a total of 6 commons, 9 uncommons, and 6 rares.
^VII: The first pre-release officially sponsored by Wizards of the Coast was held for Homelands in New York City. Ice Age, which preceded Homelands, had an unofficial widely attended pre-release in Toronto.
^VIII: 15 of the commons came in 4 alternate art versions, while 20 of them came in 3 alternate art versions causing 187 total cards but only 102 unique cards.
^IX: Homelands was not designed as part of the Ice Age block and has no thematic link to Ice Age and Alliances. Wizards of the Coast retroactively declared it part of the Ice Age block in 1997 to fit with the then-emerging standard block structure. Nearly a decade later in 2006, Coldsnap was released as a belated third entry to the Ice Age block. Homelands was reverted to a standalone set. Coldsnap was, for purposes of card legality, part of Time Spiral as far as rotation at the time, so it was legal to play in 2006-2008 era Standard formats. (Wizards of the Coast would later separate Coldsnap and Time Spiral in Extended, however.)
^X: 25 commons had 2 alternate art versions making 140 total cards but only 115 unique cards.
^XI: All commons had 2 alternate art versions making 199 total cards but only 144 unique cards and 55 unique commons.
^XII: The Coalition was a group assembled by Urza to defend Dominaria against the invasion of the Phyrexians.
^XIII: Many creatures in the Onslaught Block had the ability to "morph." Morphed creatures looked like "clay spiders."
^XIV: This does not count the alternate art for the uncommon card Brothers Yamazaki. Counting each version separately, there are 89 uncommons and 307 cards in the set.
^XV: In the Time Spiral Cycle there are special cards in each set that are "timeshifted". In Time Spiral TSP refers to all non-timeshifted cards in the set while TSB, which stands for "TimeShifted Bonus" (during development, the timeshifted cards were known as "bonus cards"), refers to the 121 timeshifted reprint cards. The timeshifted reprint cards have a purple expansion symbol and are not counted towards the number of cards in the set. Instead they form a subset with their own collector's numbers. Each Time Spiral booster pack contains exactly one Timeshifted bonus card, replacing a common. In Planar Chaos there are 45 Timeshifted Cards (20 common, 15 uncommon, and 10 rare), however, unlike in Time Spiral they were not reprints but instead they were existing cards from the past which were "colorshifted" (known, iconic cards that were printed in a different color). Colorshifted cards are recognizable by the white text for the name and type line and different background designs from the normal cards. In contrast to the timeshifted cards in Time Spiral the colorshifted cards in Planar Chaos and Future Sight are not bonus cards, meaning that they come in rarities of common, uncommon, and rare, and are counted towards the Collector's numbers of the set. However they are distributed differently than normal cards, with 3 of the commons in each booster being timeshifted, and one uncommon being replaced with a timeshifted uncommon 3/4 of the time and a timeshifted rare 1/4 of the time. In Future Sight there are 81 timeshifted Cards, composing 27 of each rarity; these were simply included in packs like ordinary cards of their rarity. However, unlike the previous sets these timeshifted cards have a future theme in that they have a different frame than normal cards and have keyword mechanics that may appear in future sets.
^XVI: Starting in Shards of Alara Wizards of the Coast introduced a new rarity level higher than rare called Mythic Rare. A mythic rare card will appear in approximately 1 out of every 8 booster packs instead of a rare.
^XVII: Chronicles, released in 1995 between Ice Age and Homelands, reprinted many previous cards, drawn from the Arabian Nights, Antiquities, Legends, and The Dark sets, that were becoming difficult to obtain but added no new cards to the game. Despite being published between Ice Age and Homelands, it is not considered part of the Ice Age Block; for purposes of tournament-legality, it was instead treated as an extension of Fourth Edition. The cards in Chronicles were reprinted with white borders, as opposed to their original black borders. Also Chronicles contained three uncommons with four alternate art versions meaning there are 125 total cards but only 116 unique cards and only 34 unique uncommons.
^XVIII: Many of the early compilation sets did not have expansion symbols of their own and instead the cards within these reprint sets just retained the symbol from their former set.
^XIX: Portal was a series of sets featuring simplified rules intended to introduce novice players of Magic: The Gathering to the game. When they were originally released, they were not legal for DCI-sanctioned tournament play, but the DCI changed its policy and the Portal sets became legal in the Vintage and Legacy tournament formats on October 20, 2005.
^XX: 5 of the commons and 2 of the uncommons were alternate versions, so there are only 200 unique cards (85 unique common, 55 unique uncommons) in Portal.
^XXI: Starter 2000 was made up of two 22-card decks and two 15-card packs, all with a fixed selection of cards.
^XXII: Astral is a set of 12 cards that was never actually printed on paper and exists only in the MicroProse Magic: The Gathering computer game (with the exception of the oversized Aswan Jaguar included in the box). All 12 cards had abilities that depended on randomness and were therefore more practical to use on the computer than on paper.
^XXIII: The Un- sets are satirical sets which, though also published by Wizards of the Coast, are not legal for DCI-sanctioned tournament play.
^XXIV: Unhinged contains 1 ultra-rare, called Super Secret Tech, which only exists as a foil rare card.
^XXV: The first event that used Mirage product was Pro Tour Atlanta on 13 September 1996.
^XXVI: The Lorwyn and Shadowmoor blocks consist of two sets each. They were released over the course of one year and thus deviate from the usual three expansion sets per year policy. Eventide was the second set in the Shadowmoor block and was released in July.
^XXVII: Of the cards in Innistrad, 6 commons, 7 uncommons, 6 rares, and 1 mythic are double-faced cards; though these appear in normal rarities, they are distributed differently, with one double-faced card always appearing per pack, replacing a common. The same is true of Dark Ascension; it has 4 commons, 4 uncommons, 3 rares, and 2 mythics as double-faced cards.
^XXVIII: 10 of the commons in Dragon's Maze are reprints of the Guildgates from Return to Ravnica and Gatecrash; while these are common, they are distributed differently than other commons, in that they instead replace the basic land in the booster pack; basic lands do not appear in Dragon's Maze booster packs. Furthermore, one of the mythic rares in Dragon's Maze, Maze's End, is distributed differently from the other mythic rares, in that it also replaces the basic land in the booster pack, rather than the rare. In addition, the basic land may also be replaced with one of the "shock lands" from Return to Ravnica or Gatecrash; although these can appear in Dragon's Maze booster packs, they are not considered part of Dragon's Maze, being identical to the "shock lands" that appeared in Return to Ravnica and Gatecrash.
^XXIX 10 of the commons in Fate Reforged are reprints of the dual lands from Khans of Tarkir; while these are common, these are distributed differently than other commons, in that they may appear in the basic land slot instead of a common slot. In addition, the land slot may also contain one of the "fetch lands" from Khans of Tarkir; although these can appear in Fate Reforged booster packs, they are not considered part of Fate Reforged, being identical to the "fetch lands" that appeared in Khans of Tarkir. In most languages, these are in fact ordinarily the only possibilities for the land slot; basic lands will not ordinarily appear except in Korean, Portuguese, Russian, and Traditional Chinese.
^XXX: Although the Masterpiece Series proper would not begin until Kaladesh block, something similar was done with Battle for Zendikar block in the form of Zendikar Expeditions. There are 25 premium Zendikar Expeditions cards that may appear in Battle for Zendikar booster packs in place of a Battle for Zendikar premium card. Similarly, there are 20 premium Zendikar Expeditions cards that may appear in Oath of the Gatewatch booster packs in a similar manner, and which are also not considered part of Oath of the Gatewatch. All Zendikar Expeditions cards, both those in Battle for Zendikar booster packs and those in Oath of the Gatewatch booster packs, have expansion code "EXP" in the official Gatherer database. These cards are not included in the count here, but they may appear in booster packs. See the Masterpiece Series section for more information.
^XXXI: Of the cards in Shadows over Innistrad, 4 commons, 20 uncommons, 6 rares, and 3 mythics are double-faced cards; though these appear in normal rarities, they are distributed differently. There is always one common or uncommon double-faced card always appearing per pack, replacing a normal common, and about 1 in 8 booster packs contain a rare or mythic double-faced card, also replacing a normal common. In Eldritch Moon, 2 commons, 10 uncommons, 2 rares, and 1 mythic rare are double-faced cards; and 2 commons, 3 rares, and 1 mythic rare are meld cards, which have half of an extra-large card on their back face.
^XXXII: Of the cards in Conspiracy, 9 commons, 8 uncommons, and 8 rares are draft-related cards; though these appear in normal rarities, they are distributed differently, with one draft-related card always appearing per pack, replacing the basic land.
^XXXIII: The Collector's Edition duplicated the Limited Edition Beta set with extra lands, had a gold bordered back instead of black, square corners instead of usual rounded, and "Collector's Edition" printed in gold on the cards.
^XXXIV: The International Collector's Edition duplicated the Limited Edition Beta set with extra lands, had a gold bordered back instead of black, square corners instead of usual rounded, and "International Edition" printed in gold on the cards.
^XXXV: The Premium Foil Booster packs have a different ink formula than the foils released in Shards of Alara booster packs resulting in a light version and a dark version for each foil. The dark versions are from the actual Shards of Alara booster packs where as the light versions are from the Premium Foil Boosters.
^XXXVI: Several cards in Unstable appear in several variations which share a card number but have various differences; cards are numbered out of 216, but there are more distinct cards than this in the set.
^XXXVII: Also known as "Introductory Two-Player Set" for European and Asian market, released at the end of 1996.
