= Magic: The Gathering Archenemy =

Variant of Magic: The Gathering

Archenemy
- Released: June 18th, 2010
- Size: Four 60-card decks, each coming with 20 oversized Scheme cards
- Designers: Kenneth Nagle (lead), Kelly Digges, Dave Guskin, Mons Johnson
- Developers: Tom LaPille (lead), Scott Larabee, Lee Sharpe, Andy Smith, Mike Turian

Archenemy is a variant of Magic: The Gathering with an emphasis on one vs. many multiplayer games. The set utilizes new oversized Scheme cards. Four game packs were released on June 18, 2010: Assemble the Doomsday Machine, Bring About the Undead Apocalypse, Scorch the World with Dragonfire, Trample Civilization Underfoot. The cards within each preconstructed deck have all been reprinted from various Magic sets, with the exception of one card per deck, that is a new card from Magic 2011. All of the cards are black bordered and tournament legal in their original formats. A sequel, Archenemy: Nicol Bolas, was released in 2017.

In 2024, with the release of Dusmourn Commander decks, 10 new Scheme cards were printed for each deck, for a total of 40 new cards.

== Gameplay ==
Archenemy is a multiplayer format where one player is selected to be the "archenemy", and the rest of the players play against them with any normal constructed deck. The archenemy starts at 40 life, plays first, and draws a card on their first turn. In addition to their normal library of Magic cards, the archenemy starts with a shuffled deck of at least 20 scheme cards where there are no more than 2 copies of any individual scheme card. Right before the beginning of the archenemy's first main phase, the archenemy draws the top card of their scheme deck and resolves that card. Schemes either result in a one time effect, with the card then moving to the bottom of their library, or an ongoing scheme which remains face up and functions similarly to an enchantment. The archenemy then proceeds with their turn normally. The archenemy's opponents share their turn steps (i.e. they occur at the same time) but do not share cards, life totals, mana pools or any other resource, similar to Two-Headed Giant. If the archenemy loses the game through any means, then all other players win. If a player other than the archenemy is defeated, their teammates carry on. The archenemy only wins the game through defeating all opponents.

=== Archenemy: Nicol Bolas ===
This edition had one major rule change which replaced the previous edition's blocking rules: "when the archenemy attacks any player or planeswalker on the opposing team, any creature a teammate of the defending player controls may be assigned as a blocker by that creature's controller. Basically, whom the archenemy's creatures are attacking is no longer a limiting factor in which creatures can be assigned as blockers".

The designers also wanted to update the flavor and balance. Nicholas Wolfram wrote, "previously, players took the roles of a nameless villain fighting against a team of anonymous heroes. For this set, we wanted Archenemy to be a more focused and tailored experience. We wanted players to immerse themselves in the roles of the heroes or villains they were adopting. So, we started with the current villain of the ongoing Magic story as the first 'official' archenemy: Nicol Bolas, the Elder Dragon Planeswalker. And who better to oppose him than the Gatewatch, the very force standing against him in the story, set to face him in battle in July's Hour of Devastation? With the character roles locked in, we were able to assemble preconstructed decks for not only the archenemy, but also for the three players facing him down. This allowed us to curate a much more balanced out-of-the-box experience than the original Archenemy, which called upon players to construct the three teammate decks themselves".

== Schemes ==
There were 45 schemes, with 5 additional promotional schemes ("Perhaps You've Met My Cohort", "Plots That Span Centuries", "Your Inescapable Doom", "Imprison This Insolent Wretch" and "Drench the Soil in Their Blood"), released. Some schemes are "Ongoing Schemes" and remain in play until a certain condition is met such as a creature entering a graveyard (e.g. "My Undead Horde Awakens"). Other schemes allow an archenemy to target an opponent (e.g. "Behold the Power of Destruction"), and some of those give the target opponent the option of being the sole player disadvantaged by that scheme or to have every opponent be targeted by a lesser disadvantage (e.g. "May Civilization Collapse").

Archenemy: Nicol Bolas introduced 20 new schemes, and Duskmourn Commander added 40 new schemes.

Wired highlighted that "the archenemy's big weapons — literally big — are larger-sized cards called schemes. At the beginning of the Archenemy's turn, he or she turns a scheme card face up — this is called 'setting a scheme in motion.' Usually the schemes benefit the villain, but not always!"

== Related products ==
=== Duels of the Planeswalkers 2012 ===
The Magic: The Gathering – Duels of the Planeswalkers 2012 video game included a cooperative campaign mode called Archenemy. IGN highlighted that archenemy "have 40, which is twice the usual starting amount, and also possess powerful Scheme Cards that only they can wield. These jerks must defeat all three players, so even if one or two of you are defeated you still have a chance to take down the bully. Players will be able to host or join a game over Steam, Xbox Live, or PlayStation Network, or computer players can be added in the absence of humans". Destructoid highlighted that "Archenemy is more interesting in multiplayer, not in the least because it's nearly impossible for new players to have any idea what is going on when there are two AI players doing all kinds of things alongside you. Sadly, you can't have a player be the Archenemy, which makes it more of a throwaway mode that is frankly far too easy to win for any type of player. [...] Archenemy in the campaign mode can also be played with two other local players, or you can take the campaign online by creating a lobby for your campaign game with the press of a button. While singleplayer won't impress anyone, the multiplayer offerings are more than enough to provide players with content that lasts as long as their interest does".

== Reception ==
Wired's "2010 GeekDad Holiday Gift Guide" stated: "Try Archenemy, a MtG variant that pits the all the players against one, the title villain who has access to larger-sized cards called schemes. [...] Each scheme features funny wording, mimicking a stereotypical villain's posturing and monologuing. Your Puny Minds Cannot Fathom lets the bad guy draw four cards, which could be pretty huge depending on the timing. Look Skyward and Despair gives the villain a red dragon creature that is immediately put on the battlefield — he doesn't even have to pay mana. My Crushing Masterstroke is particularly wicked. When this scheme is played, you take control of the good guys' creatures and turn them on their owners! The rest of the Archenemy's deck — and this is included in the set — is a standard Magic deck, so the bad guy is ready to play with no more than the usual deck-tailoring needed. His or her opponents can play with their own personal decks or can also use Archenemy decks and everyone can be out to get each other! Super fun and easy for n00bs".

In 2012, Mark Rosewater, head designer for Magic: The Gathering, stated both the Commander format and Planechase were more well "received by the audience" than Archenemy.

Matt Jarvis, for the UK print magazine Tabletop Gaming, wrote, "Magic: The Gathering's Archenemy format is a fantastic idea [...]. Unfortunately, the original 2010 release was far from approachable for those not already well versed in the complexities of building a custom Magic deck, offering four separate decks of normal cards and the oversized scheme cards for four different superpowered baddies, but requiring that players construct their own 60-card setups for their heroes, individually crafted to adjust for the different setup. This year's follow-up fixes that problem, focusing on a single big bad: the titular god-pharaoh Nicol Bolas. [...] Two of the three planeswalkers break with Magic tradition and offer decks built solely around a single type of mana and play style, rather than the traditional two, making it key to work together as a team to dish out damage while fending off Bolas' crippling attacks – the boss gets three types of mana to wield. In a major change from the 2010 rules, players can now choose to block an attack on their teammates using their own creatures, which both strengthens the feeling of co-operation and helps to even the odds a little. [...] It's not quite easy or simple enough to be a gentle introduction to Magic, but the three-on-one format is a thrilling way to experience the card-battler with a larger group that feels like a fantastic game in its own right".

Mike Linnemann (also known as Vorthos Mike), for CoolStuffInc, commented, "Archenemy is one of those sets that is a direct response to a competitor. Back nearly a decade ago, the World of Warcraft TCG did a few things right and the game's multiplayer experience, in the form of raid decks, rivaled its namesake MMO. [...] Even now, I find it hard to tell if people bought fewer Archenemy sets the first go around in 2010 or if they just printed fewer, trying to impact collectability as compared to the widely popular Planechase format. The idea was sound. The execution, especially flavorfully, didn't quite fit. I had hope they would learn from their first attempt and, wouldn't you know it, a planar antagonist in the form of Nicol Bolas could not be more perfect for the set. The Archenemy and Planechase products are rich with larger than average artworks showing us glimpses into worlds we have not seen before, both what is to come and things in the past, snippets into what was going on across the multiverse. [...] The idea is sound that the raid boss is a major antagonist, and the only choice at this time is Nicol Bolas. I just wonder if some of the schemes could've been retooled to give us some storyline information or some additional information about the plane that we hadn't known. [...] I don't think we'll have to wait nearly a decade for the next one of these either and I look forward to seeing them touch all of the villains for full completion".

Riley Hutchins, for ComicBook.com, highlighted the Archenemy format where "three players team up to take down an overwhelmingly powerful final boss". Hutchins wrote, "in the new Archenemy: Nicol Bolas, you and your friends will be thrown into an intense battle, in which one will take the role of the evil beast, and the rest will act as the Gatewatch (Nissa, Gideon, and Chandra). [...] After playing the new Archenemy extensively with a full playgroup, it is easily one of the most frustrating yet satisfying experiences in magic. It has the true feeling of terror when Nicol Bolas slaughters your entire and had us out of seats cheering and screaming when the villain was finally slain (4 games later). One thing that really stood out is the synergy of the team working together. [...] The trio is forced to work together, with all decks complementing each other, and it being impossible to take down Nicol Bolas alone. Overall Archenemy: Nicol Bolas is a lot of fun to play, especially if you dive head first into the story".
