= Bloomburrow =

Magic: The Gathering expansion set

- A maple leaf
- Released: August 2, 2024
- Size: 281 cards (81 commons, 100 uncommons, 60 rares, 20 mythic rares, 20 basic lands)
- Keywords: Gift and Offspring
- Mechanics: Expend, Forage, Valiant, Seasons, and Pawprints
- Designers: Doug Beyer (lead); Mark Rosewater; Emily Teng; Jeremy Geist; Daniel Xu; Dan Musser
- Developers: Ian Duke (lead); Mark Gottlieb; Daniel Xu; Oliver Tiu; Jadine Klomparens; Ian Adams; Neale LaPlante Johnson
- Development code: Rugby
- Expansion code: BLB
← Outlaws of Thunder Junction	Duskmourn: House of Horror →

Bloomburrow is a Magic: The Gathering expansion set released by Wizards of the Coast on August 2, 2024. It is the 101st expansion and the first set of the Dragonstorm story arc. The set takes place on the Bloomburrow plane in "Valley." It focuses on different factions of animalfolk and introduces several new mechanics such as forage, expend, and valiant, as well as revisiting threshold, each associated with a specific animalfolk faction. Bloomburrow featured guest artist David Peterson, the creator of Mouse Guard.

Bloomburrow received very positive reception from players and critics. Due to high demand, the Commander pre-constructed decks from the set were reprinted and re-released on January 6, 2025.

== Setting and story ==
Bloomburrow is set in Valley and is inhabited by anthropomorphic creatures known as animalfolk. Valley exists on the plane of Bloomburrow and follows the story of the animalfolk uniting to stop the Calamity Beasts, elemental creatures whose sudden attacks threaten their way of life. The Calamity Beasts are non-anthropomorphic animals originating from Bloomburrow. They are described as embodiments of natural disasters and control the plane's seasons, weather, and climate.

In the official story, the animalfolk of Valley are shown living together peacefully in villages before the Calamity Beasts start attacking. The first characters introduced are Helga, The Skittish Seer, a frogfolk living in Pondside, and Maha, Its Feathers Night, a Calamity Beast that leaves the dark night sky in its wake. In response to these attacks, the animalfolk of Valley work to defend their home and in the process encounter Ral Zarek, a planeswalker who appears in this plane as an otter named Ral, Crackling Wit, who joins their efforts against the Calamity Beasts. Any non-animal visitors that come to Bloomburrow transform into an animal version of themselves typically retaining key identifying features.

The main factions that comprise a majority of the story and cards correspond to Magic: The Gathering's two-color guild identities: birds in Azorius (White/Blue), rats in Dimir (Blue/Black), lizards in Rakdos (Black/Red), raccoons in Gruul (Red/Green), rabbits in Selesnya (White/Green), bats in Orzhov (White/Black), otters in Izzet (Blue/Red), squirrels in Golgari (Black/Green), mice in Boros (White/Red), and frogs in Simic (Blue/Green). Other animalfolk that appear in the set are badgers, hamsters, skunks, and weasels.

Some of the named major Calamity Beasts are Beza (elk), Eluge (fish), Lumra (bear), Maha (owl), Wildsear (wolf), and Ygra (cat), all of which are elemental creatures tied to the forces of nature. The story of Bloomburrow takes place in 4565 AR, a few years after the events of the Outlaws of Thunder Junction story.

== Development and design ==
The packaging for the Bloomburrow Play Booster pack featuring Mabel, Heir to Cragflame.

The set was first announced at Gen Con 2023 in Indianapolis, IN while hosting a panel for the 30th anniversary of Magic: The Gathering. Bloomburrow is the first set of the Dragonstorm story arc. It was designed by Doug Beyer and developed by Ian Duke. Bloomburrow also had a commander design team which was led by Annie Sardelis. According to Mark Rosewater, the team faced a challenge with the heavy typal (Note: creature type focused) set. Rosewater explained this issue further, "If only the Otter player wants the Otters, then the draft decks end up too similar to one another draft to draft and it lessens the long-term Limited playability of the set." To address this challenge, instead of including a large amount of "changeling" (Note: a creature that has all creature types) type creatures, the team instead introduced "duos", cards that represented two creatures from different factions working together—such as Bakersbane Duo.

== Mechanics and themes ==
Bloomburrow introduces the following new mechanics:

- Gift – allows the player casting the spell to choose an opponent to receive a gift, if the gift is promised there will be an added effect to the spell that was cast. Six different types of gifts were introduced with Bloomburrow: a card, an extra turn, an octopus, a tapped fish, a treasure, and a food.
- Offspring – a mechanic featured on creature spells that allows the player casting the spell to pay an additional cost. If the offspring cost is paid the creature will enter and create a 1/1 token copy of itself. If the offspring cost isn't paid the creature will enter normally and will not create a token copy of itself.
- Forage – the player has the choice to either exile three cards from their graveyard or sacrifice a food as an additional cost. Forage is primarily associated with the squirrel faction, it appears on six squirrel type creature spells and one instant spell, all of which are black, green, or Golgari—both black and green.
- Expend – a mechanic that tracks the total mana that a player spends on spells in a single turn. If the player spends the expend amount on spells in one turn, the expend effect or trigger occurs. Expend is exclusively found on red, green, or Gruul—red and green—cards and primarily associated with the raccoon faction.
- Valiant – a triggered ability that causes an effect whenever a card is targeted for the first time each turn. Valiant is primarily associated with the mouse faction, it appears on nine mouse type creature spells, all of which are white, red, or Boros—both white and red.
- Seasons and Pawprints – a modal mechanic that allows the player to spend five pawprints while casting the spell to create different effects. There are one, two, and three cost pawprint options.

It also modifies the rules term enter the battlefield, and revisits the enchantment type class, the ability threshold, and the artifact type food. With the release of the Bloomburrow set, the rules term enter the battlefield was shortened to enter to allow for shorter and more concise card text. Class, first introduced in Forgotten Realms, is an enchantment type spell that is "leveled up" by paying a mana cost for each level and receiving the benefit of that level while the enchantment remains on the battlefield. Threshold was originally introduced in Odyssey and is primarily associated with the rat faction in Bloomburrow. Food is a type of artifact token that was introduced in Throne of Eldraine and is revisited in Bloomburrow. Food can be tapped and sacrificed for two colorless mana to gain three life.

== Card and product details ==
The main set contains 281 cards, including 81 commons, 100 uncommons, 60 rares, 20 mythic rares, and 20 basic lands. It was released in a variety of product forms. Play boosters are randomized 14 card packs and include 1 Token, Ad, or Art card and at least one foil card. Value boosters are randomized 7 card packs (only available at select retailers) containing 3 commons, 2 uncommons, 1 wildcard (of any rarity), and one card that may be a land, a foil card, or a Special Guests card. The Bloomburrow Starter Kit which includes two preconstructed 60-card decks and two traditional foil legendary creature cards, as well as two codes to unlock both decks on MTG Arena. The Bloomburrow Bundle includes nine Bloomburrow Play Boosters, one foil alternate-art Thundertrap Trainer, 15 non-foil full-art basic lands, ten foil default-frame basic lands, five foil full-art basic lands, a spindown life counter, and a themed storage box.

The Bloomburrow Commander set icon, a stylized flower in the shape of a shield. Courtesy Wizards of the Coast

Bloomburrow released four Commander pre-constructed decks. The set code is BLC and the set icon is a styllized flower in the shape of a shield. Squirreled Away, a Golgari squirrel themed set with Hazel of the Rootbloom as the commander. Family Matters, a Jeskai (White/Blue/Red) deck that focuses on the offspring mechanic and is commanded by Zinnia, Valley's Voice. Animated Army, a Gruul deck that primarily uses enchantments as creatures with the commander Bello, Bard of the Brambles. Peace Offering, which is Bant (Green/White/Blue) and is a "group hug" (Note: A deck archetype that aims to provide resources such as mana, cards, creatures, health, and tokens to opponents. This deck type focuses heavily on "politics" where a player makes bargains and deals with opponents that impact the game.) style deck featuring Ms. Bumbleflower as the commander.

In addition to the main set, Bloomburrow featured numerous treatments. 24 "Imagine: Courageous Critters" cards which are non-canon alternate art cards of planeswalkers and creatures in animalfolk forms. 21 Japanese raised foil anime cards featuring alternate anime art and unique borders. Eight "field notes" alternate art cards (all of which are borderless) for the Calamity Beasts. 20 full-art land cards, four of each land type—spring, summer, fall, and winter versions. 42 "Showcase Woodland" border cards, 11 borderless cards, and 13 extended art cards complete the set.

Special Guest cards for Bloomburrow have the set code SPG and a set icon that is a star inside of a pentagon. These cards can be found in Bloomburrow packs and include Frogmite, Kindred Charge, Ledger Shredder, Rat Colony, Relentless Rats, Secluded Courtyard, Sword of Fire and Ice, Swords to Plowshares, Sylvan Tutor, and Toski, Bearer of Secrets.

== Gameplay and format legality ==
As of July 25, 2025 cards from Bloomburrow are legal in Standard, Pioneer, Modern, Legacy, Vintage, and Commander formats. Specific cards from the set can be banned or restricted in different formats. Legality is available on the official Gatherer website.

== Reception ==
Bloomburrow was received positively by players and critics alike. Chase Carroll, a Commander content creator expressed that even though the set was not for them, that it is "one of Magic's greatest sets of all time." De Hoog of CG Magazine was initially skeptical of Bloomburrow but was won over by the story and the potential for the Commander format. When Rosewater was asked whether Bloomburrow would be visited in another set on his tumblr blog, he ranked it amongst the most likely/soonest to revisit, making Bloomburrow a more popular plane than Theros or Eldraine.

== See also ==
- Magic: The Gathering formats
- Redwall
