= Magic: The Gathering formats =

Ways in which the game can be played

Magic: The Gathering formats are various ways in which the Magic: The Gathering collectible card game can be played. Each format provides rules for deck construction and gameplay, with many confining the pool of permitted cards to those released in a specified group of Magic card sets. The Wizards Play Network (WPN; formerly known as the DCI), the governing body that oversees official Magic competitive play, categorizes its tournament formats into Constructed and Limited. Additionally, there are many casual formats with the Commander format being one of the most popular formats of the game.

== Overview ==
Formats are divided into two main categories by the Wizards Play Network: Tournament and Casual. The term "sanctioned" refers to formats that the Wizards Play Network allows to be run at official events. Officially sanctioned events can also add additional rules such as disallowing proxy cards.

A number of other formats have been designed by Wizards of the Coast or by players themselves for custom gameplay or reduced investment cost; these are known as casual formats. Some casual formats utilize rules or sets of cards that differ from those used in sanctioned tournament play. One of the most popular formats of Magic is the Commander format which is technically a casual sanctioned format. In 2015, Wizards of the Coast officially sanctioned many casual formats, including "Invent Your Own Format", for use at Friday Night Magic events.

Formats can further be divided by if they are Constructed or Limited formats. Constructed formats require decks to be made prior to participation, with players allowed to use any tournament-legal cards they possess. Sanctioned Constructed formats include Standard, Pioneer, Modern, Legacy, and Vintage. Limited formats, in contrast, utilize a restricted and unknown pool of cards, usually formed by opening Magic products such as play and draft boosters, or prerelease boxes. Limited competition require players to select cards and build decks on the fly within the tournament itself. The primary two sanctioned Limited formats are Sealed Deck and Booster Draft.

== Tournament formats ==
The following is a non-exhaustive summary of some of the major tournament formats:

=== Constructed ===
Constructed formats, as opposed to Limited formats, allow players to build decks from the entirety of the legal cards available in the specified format. The formats differ based on the card pool allowed, which affects each format's accessibility, power level, and complexity. In Constructed format tournaments, players build their deck in advance of the tournament.

The following rules apply to most sanctioned Constructed formats:

- Constructed decks must contain a minimum of 60 cards. There is no maximum deck size.
- Players may have a sideboard of up to a maximum of 15 cards, and exchanges of cards between games are not required to be on a one-for-one basis, so long as the player adheres to the 60 card minimum deck size.
- With the exception of basic land cards and cards that specify otherwise, a player's combined deck and sideboard may not contain more than four of any individual card, unless stated otherwise, counted by its English card title equivalent. All cards named Plains, Island, Swamp, Mountain, Forest, and Wastes are basic.
- A card may only be used in a particular format if the card is from a set that is legal in that format or has the same name as a card from a set that is legal in that format.
- Cards banned in a specific format may not be used in decks for that format. Cards restricted in a specific format may only have one copy in a deck, including sideboard.

==== Standard ====
The Standard (originally called "Type 2") format was introduced in 1995 and became the flagship format in the constructed deck tournament scene. It is also the format most commonly found at Friday Night Magic tournaments, played weekly at many hobby shops. A variation of the format called Arena Standard is used for online play through Magic: The Gathering Arena. This format generally consists of the most recent standard sets (expansion/core set) releases. Sets are included in the standard format for up to three years, with the four oldest sets being removed from the format in the fall "rotation"; thus the number of sets included in the standard format is at its lowest immediately after the rotation and increases as new sets are released until the oldest sets are rotated out again the following fall. The previous rule was using three to four recent "Block" releases plus any core sets released between the older set of the block and the first set that would make oldest two blocks rotated out.

As of October 2026, the current Standard set includes: Wilds of Eldraine, The Lost Caverns of Ixalan, Murders at Karlov Manor, Outlaws of Thunder Junction, Bloomburrow, Duskmourn: House of Horror, Foundations, Aetherdrift, Tarkir: Dragonstorm, Final Fantasy, Edge of Eternities, Marvel's Spider-Man (reskinned as Through the Omenpaths on Digital), Avatar: the Last Airbender, Lorwyn Eclipsed, Teenage Mutant Ninja Turtles, Secrets of Strixhaven, Marvel Super Heroes, The Hobbit, and Reality Fracture.

==== Modern ====
Modern is a constructed format created by Wizards of the Coast in the Spring of 2011 as a response to the increasing popularity of the Legacy format which, although popular, proved difficult to access due to the high price of staple cards, as well as dissatisfaction with the Extended format of the time. Wizards of the Coast is unwilling to reprint some of these cards due to the Reserved List, a list of cards Wizards promised never to reprint in order to protect card prices. Therefore, Modern was designed as a new format that would exclude all cards on the Reserved List, allowing the format to be more accessible than Legacy.

Modern allows cards from all core sets, beginning with the 8th Edition core set and all expansions printed afterwards. The 8th Edition core set was when Magic cards began to be printed in modern card frames, and so is where the name for the format is derived. Wizards believed this cutoff would have the advantage of giving a visual cue as to which cards were legal in the Modern format. Additionally, Wizards created “straight-to-Modern” sets which skip other formats (such as Standard) entirely, but are legal in the Modern format. The format maintains its own banned list. Cards are banned on the basis of their power level, as in all constructed formats outside Vintage. The first official tournament to be held using the format was Pro Tour Philadelphia in September 2011. The first Grand Prix to use the format was Grand Prix Lincoln in February 2012.

CBR highlighted that "the Modern format is more intense and competitive than Standard [...]. Only a tiny fraction of legal Modern cards end up in modern decks, thanks to the Modern format's high standards for playable cards. An entire 250-card set could only contribute four or five to the format, if not fewer. [...] A Standard or casual player getting into Modern will realize that they're on the verge of winning or losing even within the first four turns; in short, a game can go from 0 to 60 with astonishing speed. [...] Modern has one of the richest metas of all, boasting many decks of different color combinations and archetypes".

==== Pioneer ====
Pioneer was created in the autumn of 2019. The rules for card legality are similar to Modern, consisting of cards that were released into the Standard format starting with a given expansion set. For Pioneer, the first legal expansion set is Return to Ravnica. The cutoff was made as Return to Ravnica was the first block released after Modern was made an official format.

Like other constructed formats, Pioneer maintains its own banned list.

==== Historic ====
In 2019, a "MTG Arena-first format" was officially announced. The new Historic format was created as a way for players to use cards that are available on Arena, but are not currently legal in the Standard format due to rotation, ban, or other reasons. The three ways that cards join the historic format are: appearing in a standard-legal set, appearing in supplemental sets released on Arena (such as the non-standard set Jumpstart ), or added via 15-20 card sets called Historic Anthologies. Like other constructed formats, Historic maintains its own banned list.

The Historic format was featured as the format of the Pro Tour event, The Mythic Invitational taking place September 10–13, 2020.

==== Legacy ====
Legacy allows cards from all sets (known as an "Eternal" format). It maintains a curated ban list based on power level reasons. The format evolved from Type 1.5, which allowed cards from all sets and maintained a banned list corresponding to Vintage: all cards banned or restricted in the old Type 1 were banned in Type 1.5. The modern Legacy format began in 2006, as the DCI separated Legacy's banned list from Vintage and banned many new cards to reduce the power level of the format. Legacy allows various cards that other formats would ban quickly, with a relatively small ban list for all of the cards that would be usable in it.

Wizards has supported the format with Grand Prix events and the release of preconstructed Legacy decks on Magic Online in November 2010. The first Legacy Grand Prix was Grand Prix Philadelphia in 2005.

==== Vintage ====
The Vintage format (formerly known as Type 1) is another Eternal constructed format. Vintage maintains a small banned list and a larger restricted list. Unlike in the other formats, the WPN does not ban cards in Vintage for power level reasons. Cards banned in Vintage are those that either involve ante, manual dexterity (Falling Star, Chaos Orb), or could hinder event rundown (Shahrazad and Conspiracy cards). Cards that raise power level concerns are instead restricted to a maximum of one copy per deck. The one exception to this was Lurrus of the Dream Den, which could be cast from outside the game and thus could not meaningfully be restricted; Lurrus was unbanned after a rule change in 2021. Vintage is currently the only tabletop format in which cards are restricted.

Because of the expense in acquiring the old cards to play competitive Vintage, many Vintage tournaments are unsanctioned and permit players to use a certain number of proxy cards. These are treated as stand-ins of existing cards and are not normally permitted in tournaments sanctioned by the WPN. Dot eSports highlighted that "Vintage is Legacy, except you can add one copy of cards on the 'restricted list' (the 50 or so most powerful cards in the game). These decks, quite simply, are the most powerful things in Magic and are insanely fast and lethal. They're also prohibitively expensive".

==== Pauper ====
Pauper is a Magic format in which card legality is based on rarity. Any cards that either have been printed at the common rarity in paper or appeared as common in a Magic Online set at least once are legal. A variant format is Pauper Standard, which is Standard but only with common cards. Destructoid commented that the Pauper format is being picked up by "many local gaming stores".

The format was originally an official format exclusive for Magic Online on December 1, 2008, using Magic Online's own rarity list for pre-7th Edition cards appearing in the Master's Edition series, though some paper Pauper events have been run on that list. After it became a sanctioned format in June 2019, all paper and digital sets were put into consideration instead. In January 2022, Wizards of the Coast announced additional support for the format via the newly formed Pauper Format Panel; the panel is led by Gavin Verhey, a senior designer at Wizards of the Coast, along with "six Magic players and personalities from the Pauper community". This panel provides play recommendations, such as removing or unbanning cards, and will focus on the "health of the format". When asked about the state of the format in 2026, Verhey explained that Pauper "has become an official format", however, "speaking of large qualifying-level events, or official precon decks, that's harder to say. [...] I'd love to be able to just give players a full deck to get started. [...] So if you never played it, go give it a try, and maybe someday we'll get there".

==== Premodern ====
Premodern is an unofficial format, created by Martin Berlin in 2012, where only Standard legal set cards from 1995–2003 (4th Edition to Scourge) are permitted in play. This format features the play "era right between Modern (2003–present) and Old School (93–94)", where some cards are banned to allow Premodern "more of a distance between it and Legacy". It also allows some cards which are on Wizard of the Coast's Restricted List. Polygon stated that "Premodern offers a distinct experience from any other official format" as "cards were very different before 2004". ICv2 described it as "a largely solved format", noting that its "community-monitored" ban list "is the only real mechanism that rotates cards in and out of the format (changing up the top decks)". Unlike official Wizards of the Coast formats, Premodern allows proxy and promo cards. The format's growing popularity has also led to the price of some older cards spiking on the secondary market.

In 2026, ICv2 stated that the format only gained true popularity in "the last five to seven years" which they attributed to "nostalgia for earlier styles of Magic: The Gathering play, older Magic players' frustration with Universes Beyond cards changing the flavor of more current modern formats" as well as "more major events for the format being run at conventions". Polygon also credited the format's increased popularity to "its recent introduction to Magic Online". When asked about potential official support, designer Mark Rosewater explained that it is "hard for us to do anything for Premodern" as they "can't give you more cards" but they are considering reprint options. On creating new cards for the format, Rosewater stated that Premodern's "whole point is to represent a slice of history. Even if we try to design things in the spirit of what that time was, I don't know if that violates the mere essence of what the format is".

=== Limited ===
Limited formats are so-called because they require players to build their decks from a more limited pool of cards than Constructed formats. Limited formats require players to open a specified number of Magic products, and then work exclusively with the cards that came from that product. Due to the nature of Limited formats, players cannot build their decks in advance of the tournament and must build their deck within the tournament itself.

The three sanctioned Limited formats are:

- Sealed Deck: in Sealed Deck tournaments, each player receives six booster packs to build "the best 40-card deck they can". Depending on which sets are to be used in a sealed deck event, the distribution of packs can vary greatly. For example, a Magic 2010 sealed deck event consists of six Magic 2010 boosters, but a sanctioned Shards of Alara block sealed deck event consists of two Shards of Alara, two Conflux, and two Alara Reborn booster packs.
- Booster Draft: in a booster draft, several players (usually eight) are seated around a table and each player is given three booster packs. Each player opens a pack, selects a card from it and passes the remaining cards to their left. Each player then selects one of the remaining cards from the pack that was just passed to them, and passes the remaining cards to the left again. This continues until all of the cards are depleted. The process is repeated with the second and third packs, except that the cards are passed to the right in the second pack. Players then build decks out of any cards that they selected during the drafting and add as many basic lands as they choose. Each deck built this way must have a minimum of 40 cards, including basic lands.
- Rochester Draft: a booster draft variant that was commonly used as a format in Pro Tour and Grand Prix. Although it is still a sanctioned format, the format "at a competitive level is remarkably rare". In 2018, Wizards of the Coast ran the Silver Showcase which was an invite-only Rochester Draft held before the 25th Anniversary Pro Tour. The format differs from traditional booster draft in that packs are opened one at a time and are laid out for each player to see. Players openly pick one card from the pack in turn. Once each player has picked a card from the booster pack, the draft order reverses so that the last player to draft a card from the pack takes the next draft pick and then passes the pack back the way it came. Once each player has opened a booster and followed this process, the final player to open a booster opens their next booster and the draft pick order is reversed. The process is repeated until each player has opened three booster packs each and all the cards in those packs have been drafted.

The following rules apply to all current sanctioned Limited formats:

- Limited decks must contain a minimum of 40 cards. There is no maximum deck size.
- Players are not restricted to four of any one card in Limited tournament play, unless a card states otherwise.
- Any drafted or opened cards not used in a player's Limited deck function as their sideboard. Players may request additional basic land cards (not including Snow-covered lands and Wastes, which only appear in specific sets) for their sideboard. There are no restrictions on the number of cards a player may exchange this way as long as the main deck contains at least forty cards. Cards do not need to be exchanged on a one-for-one basis.

=== Sanctioned Multiplayer ===
Traditionally, Magic is a game that is played between two players, however, it is also possible to play with multiple players. Despite the existence of numerous multiplayer formats, Two-Headed Giant is currently the only multiplayer format that has been officially sanctioned by the WPN.

- Two-Headed Giant (2HG): a team game where pairs of players share turns and life totals. Each player has their own separate deck and plays independently of their teammate, however, teammates share the goal of defeating the opposing team. The 2HG format can be used to play Constructed or Limited games. In Constructed 2HG, no cards can be used by both members of the team, except basic land cards. In June 2005, rules for handling multiplayer games were added to the official rulebook, and 2HG team play became the first multiplayer format to be sanctioned by the DCI. The first Two-Headed Giant Grand Prix was Grand Prix Amsterdam in 2007. The first Pro Tour to be held under the Two-Headed Giant format was Pro Tour San Diego in 2007. On June 8, 2018, Battlebond was released as the first Two-Headed Giant-focused booster set. In June 2025, for play at WPN stores, Wizards of the Coast launched a Commander variant of Two-Headed Giant – "players pair up in teams of two, share life totals, spells, and strategy in an effort to defeat the other team".

== Casual formats ==
Casual play groups and even Wizards of the Coast have developed many alternative formats for playing the game. These formats are designed to accommodate larger numbers of players, to allow two or more players to work together as a team, or create specific requirements for deck construction. Not all formats are officially sanctioned formats. However, many of these variants are popular in tournament play, though not all have support from Wizards of the Coast. Several casual formats have been implemented in Magic: The Gathering Online and Magic: The Gathering Arena.

Jan Švelch, in the academic journal Analog Game Studies, highlighted that "along the way, players themselves started creating their own formats and even more actively influencing the life of the game", noting that Wizards of the Coast has "embraced some of these community formats by releasing cards made especially for such formats". Švelch explained that "many of these emergent formats address the more controversial aspects of the official and sanctioned Magic formats, for example the rather high barrier of entry for new players and the high level of competitiveness". The communities for some unofficial formats also do their own maintenance "through regular updates of rules and a banlist whenever new sets are released or when particular metagames converge around a small number of extremely efficient decks". Švelch argued that the "creation of such community formats and their consequent commercialization by publishers can also be seen as a manifestation of fan labor in which fans create value which is later capitalized on by the official producers".

=== Casual Constructed ===
As with sanctioned formats, most casual formats can be categorized into Constructed or Limited formats. Casual constructed formats include:

- Peasant: a format similar to Pauper (where only common cards are legal), in Peasant, a deck may contain up to 5 uncommon cards and the rest must be common. Peasant Magic was created by Rob Baranowski who felt that players with limited access to cards should still have an opportunity for competitive play. Tournaments for this format have taken place at Gen Con since 2001. However, the original banned list is considered to be outdated and most tournaments are played by the rules of the largest active Peasant community.
- Singleton: a format where players are allowed to use only one of each card instead of the usual limit of four. This variation is also known as "Legendary" (in Magic, before the Magic 2014 Core Set rule change, there could only be one of any legend card in the game), or "Restricted" (tournament formats with a restricted list insist that decks have no more than one of those cards) Magic. The "Elder Dragon Highlander (EDH)" variation became the Commander format. Some versions of this format require that the decks have a minimum of 100 cards, ban sideboards, and institute a special rule for mulligans with hands having either too many or too few lands. In temporary events in Magic: The Gathering Arena, it's possible to play in the Singleton format.
- Tribal Wars: a constructed casual format in which one-third of every deck must be of a single creature type. Common tribes in Magic include elves, goblins, and merfolk. Certain cards are banned in the Magic Online variant of Tribal Wars that would be overly swingy against known enemy Tribal decks, such as Circle of Solace or Engineered Plague.
- Gladiator: introduced during the COVID-19 pandemic and the cessation of live events, Gladiator is a casual constructed, singleton format that is specific to Magic: The Gathering Arena.

=== Casual Limited ===
Limited casual formats include all the sanctioned formats as well. Formats include:

- Cube Draft: a booster draft variant in which the pool of cards is a predetermined set of cards chosen for the purpose of drafting them. The pool of cards is known as a Cube and usually contains a minimum of 360 cards to accommodate an eight-player booster draft. The cards used in a Cube are usually unique so that no card appears more than once in a draft. Typically, the card pool is an amalgamation of powerful cards from throughout the history of Magic, although the card pool can be whatever theme is desired. The Cube Draft format has been sanctioned by Magic Online in 2012, albeit for limited time runs. Cube Draft was first used as a format at the 2012 Magic Players Championship.
- Back Draft: a draft variant where each player tries to build the worst deck possible, because each player gives another player that deck to play in the tournament. To avoid mana problems, players choose what lands to add in the deck after they are "backdrafted". Scoring is usually done where a player gains a point each time the deck they play with wins and each time the deck they built loses.
- Reject Rare Draft: is a format in which each player donates 45 rare cards (the same number as in 3 regular boosters) and then drafts as normal. The rares are "donated", as everyone takes home the deck they draft and no attempt is made to return the rares to the original owners, as all the rares donated must be able to be categorized as an "unplayable" rare occasionally printed by MTG for any number of reasons. Hence "reject rare draft". This variant was developed at Neutral Ground, a gaming store owned by Brian David-Marshall, a columnist for Wizards and noted commentator in the Magic world.
- Type 4 (or Limited Infinity): in this format players randomly draft a 45 card deck from a large card pool (similar to a cube draft) without knowing the cards included in their deck. Players get infinite mana but are only allowed 1 spell per turn (1 each turn, their own and 1 during each opponent's turn). A starting hand is 5 cards.

=== Casual Multiplayer ===
The majority of multiplayer formats are casual formats, with Two-Headed Giant being the only multiplayer format to ever be sanctioned. Many formats can be adapted for multiple players, however, some formats are designed specifically for play with multiple players. Multiplayer formats include:

- Assassin: in this format players are randomly assigned "targets" to defeat. Assassins and targets are selected by picking out pairs of cards (such as two forests two mountains two plains etc.) According to the number of players. Each player is dealt one type of card which is placed face up next to player. The other cards are shuffled and dealt face down (this is their target). Each player may only attack the target assigned to them. Players score points for delivering the finishing blow to their assigned target as well as for being the last survivor. Defeating another player grants you their "contract", and thus a new target to attack. If a player is dealt their matching card, then they are considered rogue and may target any player.
- Emperor: in this format two teams, each generally composed of three players, play to ensure their central player (the "Emperor") outlasts the other. A team wins the game when the opposing Emperor has been eliminated, it does not matter if that team has any other players left on the team. Teams can either be pre determined or randomly decided. After teams have been selected Emperors are decided in the same fashion. Range of influence is a standard rule enforced upon each emperor during a game. It is widely debated what a fair range of influence is and should be discussed before the match. (Example: An Emperor with a ROI of 1 can only cast spells and abilities as far as 1 player to his left or right. A ROI of 2 enables targeting of 2 players left or right. This effectively allows emperors to use harmful spells on non emperor enemy players) Another rule worth noting is all creatures gain a tap ability that reads "Target Teammate gains control of this creature." Summoning sickness affects use of this rule. If a player leaves the game for any reason all of their permanents leave the game as well regardless of who controls them. A variant is a game with five players per team (an Emperor, two Generals, and two Lieutenants).

=== Commander ===
The Commander format launched in 2011, which was derived from a fan-created format known as "Elder Dragon Highlander (EDH)"; the format uses 100 card singleton decks (no duplicates except basic lands and cards that state otherwise), a starting life total of 40, and features a "Commander" or "General". The Commander must be a legendary creature (with some exceptional cases, usually Planeswalkers with text that specifically states they can be a Commander), and all cards in the deck can only have mana symbols on them from the Commander's colors. The Commander is not included in one's library; it is visible to all players in the "command" zone and can be played as if it was in one's hand. Whenever it leaves the battlefield or otherwise changes zones, the Commander's owner may choose to put it back into the "command" zone instead, and playing it afterwards will cost 2 more uncolored mana (and so on if this repeats). If a player takes 21 combat damage from any one commander, that player loses the game regardless of life total (a rule to bring games to an eventual halt and somewhat keep lifegain in check). The format has its own official banned list. The format "supports two to six players, sometimes more".

Since 2011, Wizards of the Coast has released a product line containing preconstructed Commander decks. The format was initially maintained independently by the Commander Rules Committee (CRC) until September 2024 when the CRC turned over management of the format to Wizards of the Coast. In 2021, Dot eSports highlighted that "Commander has become one of the biggest formats in Magic over the past five years, even leading to Wizards of the Coast dubbing 2020 as 'The Year of Commander.' The format is a boon for novice and experienced deckbuilders to craft thematic decks centered around Magic’s over 1,200 Legendary creatures". Charlie Hall, for Polygon, commented in 2020 that "many Magic players see creating a Commander deck as the ultimate expression of a player's skill, and of their ability to use their personal collection of cards to its fullest. The Commander format embodies the game's reputation for competition, but also for storytelling". Jason Coles, for Dicebreaker, wrote that Commander is "possibly the most popular format in all of Magic: The Gathering [...]. It's a fun format that generally features groups of up to four players duking it out and trying to keep each other in check".

==== Oathbreaker ====
The Oathbreaker format launched in 2023, which was derived from a fan-created variation of Commander. It was created by the Weirdcards Charitable Club, a Minnesota-based gaming group, "around 2017" before becoming an officially supported format by Wizards of the Coast in March 2023. This format is free-for-all multiplayer with three to five players who each start with 20 life; the winner is the last standing player. Each player builds a 58-card singleton deck along with selecting an "Oathbreaker (a planeswalker card) and a Signature Spell (an instant or sorcery) that matches the color identity of the Oathbreaker" to go with the deck. "The Oathbreaker and the Signature Spell start in the command zone at the beginning of each game, and can be cast during the game at their normal costs, plus an additional two mana for each time they have been cast. Both of these cards return to the command zone if they would go to the graveyard".

=== Variant Magic: The Gathering products ===
Wizards of the Coast have released a number of official products creating new, or supporting existing, casual formats. Below is a list of the formats these products were created for.

==== Vanguard ====
This variant was designed specifically for social play. Each player has a special card that affects the game. These cards change the players' starting life total and cards in hand, and have additional effects as well. Vanguard initially began with special oversized Vanguard cards, released as part of various promotions. Only four sets of avatar cards were made before the product was discontinued. The cards featured depicted major characters from the storyline of Magic, including Gerrard Capashen, Karn and Squee. A new version of Vanguard was eventually added to Magic Online, with a player's avatar filling the role of the oversized physical cards. Players are given a standard set of avatars and can receive more as entry and high-finishing prizes in release events. New avatars are regularly added as new sets of Magic cards are released, each depicting a card from the set. The wider availability online, combined with occasional tournaments, has made online Vanguard more of a success than its physical predecessor.

==== Planar Magic ====
In September 2009, Wizards of the Coast released the Planechase product. The product was designed to allow players to play the new casual 'Planar Magic' format. The format can be played with two or more players. Each player requires a traditional Magic deck and a 'planar deck' of plane cards, players also need a 'planar die'. The first player turns over a plane card from the top of their planar deck and that card affects the game as specified on the card. The current plane card only changes when the specific symbol on the planar dice is rolled. In 2012, Wizards announced that they would be making a new set of Planechase game packs. They were released on June 1, 2012.

==== Archenemy ====
In June 2010, Wizards of the Coast released the Archenemy product. The product allowed players to play a new multiplayer casual format designed by Wizards of the Coast. The format is designed for four players with one player taking the role of the Archenemy and the other three players creating a team to play against the Archenemy.

Each player plays with a traditional Magic deck, however, the Archenemy also possess a 'scheme deck' of 20 oversized cards. During the first main phase of the Archenemy's turn they turn over a card from their Scheme deck and use its effect. The effects of scheme cards are usually powerful to allow the Archenemy a greater chance of defeating their three opponents. The Archenemy starts at 40 life while all other players start at the traditional 20 life. The Archenemy also always takes the first turn and draws a card at the beginning of this turn. The Archenemy's opponents share a turn, as in the Two-Headed Giant format, however they play individually and cannot share resources.

The Archenemy wins the game by defeating each member of the opposing team, whilst the opposing team wins if they defeat the Archenemy.

==== Brawl ====
Brawl format is a variant format of Commander developed by WotC staff Gerritt Turner which launched in 2018. Brawl utilizes all cards that are currently legal in Standard and has a rotation schedule similar to that of Standard. While similar to traditional Commander, deck size is limited to 60 cards and each player starts with 30 health. The format is commonly played as a sanctioned event on Magic: The Gathering Online and on MTG Arena. It was a highly requested addition to MTG Arena but the "variant never took off on paper". The physical format was not well received by the players due to a "shortage of preconstructed decks" and the resale price of individual cards.

=== Other casual formats ===
Various alternative rules can be used to govern the construction of decks. Some of these variants have become so popular that unsanctioned tournaments have taken place at various Magic tournaments and gaming-oriented conventions such as Gen Con.

- Artisan is a Magic Arena-specific constructed format. All cards must be either common or uncommon rarity. Artisan events may use either Standard or Historic format legality for cards.
- Horde Magic is a cooperative multiplayer variant of Magic. The Allied players face off against the Horde deck, which is automatically controlled. The Horde automatically casts a semi-random number of creatures and effects from it every turn, then attacks with everything possible. The default flavor of the Horde are mindless attacking zombies. The Horde has no life total, but damage to it reduces its library of cards. If the players can survive until the Horde runs out of cards, they win.
- Mental Magic is a format in which cards may be played as any card in the game with the same mana cost.
- Mini-Magic is a constructed variant where decks are built with a maximum card limit of 15 and a maximum hand size of 3. Because of the small deck size, the state-based action causing a player to lose when they attempt to draw a card from their empty library is ignored. Select cards are banned in this format due to their heightened power level given the limited deck size. Alternatively, the format may be drafted using a single booster pack per person, this is known as Mini-Master or Pack Wars.
- Dandân where the players share a deck, typically a mono-blue deck, with the only creature being Dandân.

== Retired formats ==
=== Extended ===
The Extended format, was a format created in 1997 that contained more sets than Standard / Type II, but fewer sets than Vintage / Type 1. In 1997, it consisted of cards from The Dark and forward, and any edition of the basic set from Revised and forward, which at the time included Chronicles, as well as all promotional cards. By 2002, it changed to consist of the last six-to-eight years of sets, rotating every three years. In 2008, the format was changed to a flat last seven years regardless, with a rotation each year. In 2010, the format was changed again to consist of only the last four years of blocks and core sets. With each autumn set release, one year's worth of sets rotate out of the format. Any additional sets released between rotations are automatically added to this format's card pool. The new system was implemented to reduce the format's card pool, with the intention that this would make the format more understandable and attractive to play. On July 22, 2013, Wizards of the Coast announced that the Extended format would be retired, with the final sanctioned events occurring on October 8, 2013.

=== Block Constructed ===
The Block Constructed format uses only the cards from a single block of Magic sets. Magic sets from Mirage to Khans of Tarkir have come in groups of three sets known as blocks. Block Constructed formats, and blocks themselves, usually take the name of the first set in the block. For example, the Ravnica Block Constructed format consists of Ravnica: City of Guilds, Guildpact, and Dissension. Only cards that were printed in the sets in the appropriate block can be used in Block Constructed formats. The Lorwyn and Shadowmoor blocks were a minor exception, as they were two mini-blocks of two sets each that were combined to make the Lorwyn-Shadowmoor Block Constructed format.

After 2015's Battle for Zendikar, blocks now consist of only two sets. Despite Wizards of the Coast still sanctioned Block Constructed event, no major events like Grand Prix or Pro Tour used that format since then, and has played the importance of the formats down. The format itself would be dropped in April 2018, when Block was no longer used in Standard sets.

=== Prismatic ===
In Prismatic or 5-Color, players must build very large decks of at least 250 cards and accommodate a minimum number of cards of each color. This format was first developed by Kurt Hahn and several other players in the Milwaukee area in 1999–2000. 5-Color was managed by the 5CRC (5-Color Ruling Council), which while not affiliated with Wizards of the Coast, organized tournaments, had its own list of banned and restricted cards, and had a world championship held at Gen Con. It also supported ante cards, an initial component of the rules for Magic that has since been deprecated. When Magic Online was under development, this format was requested by many users, and it was added as "Prismatic" with slight differences. An additional "big deck" mulligan was also standard online, allowing players to compensate for hands with too many or too few lands. However, the 5CRC eventually stopped sanctioning tournaments and changed leadership, and the Magic Online Prismatic format was discontinued due to lack of interest in 2015.
