= Starter (Magic: The Gathering) =

Two sets of Magic: The Gathering starter-level sets

- five-pointed star
- Released: August 27, 1999
- Size: 173
- Keywords: none
- Mechanics: none
- Development code: None
- Expansion code: S99

Third set in the Starter Block block
Starter	Starter 2000	7th Edition Starter
← Portal Three Kingdoms	Mercadian Masques →

Starter 2000
- "S" overlaid on a five-pointed star
- Released: April 24, 2000
- Size: 54
- Keywords: none
- Mechanics: none
- Development code: none
- Expansion code: S00

Second set in the Starter Block block
Starter	Starter 2000	7th Edition Starter
← Nemesis	Prophecy →

Starter is the name of two Magic: The Gathering starter-level sets. The first Starter (later known as Starter 1999) was released on August 27, 1999 and was the fourth starter level set. It was followed by Starter 2000, the fifth and final starter set, on April 24, 2000.

== Set history ==
After three sets in the Portal block, Starter was Wizards of the Coast's fourth major attempt at a "Starter Level" set that new players could come into the game and understand. Most of its cards were reprints of cards already available (many of them from the Portal block sets). But it also contained 26 new cards, created just for the release. Starter cards were available in a fixed-deck game, randomized boosters and 5 preconstructed decks (one for each color). The starter game came with two decks, two playmats, a step-by-step play guide, and a simplified version of the Magic: The Gathering rule-book. The starter-game contained eight cards which weren't available in the boosters. Starter had a short print run, and has become very difficult to find. It was replaced with Starter 2000 less than a year later.

Starter 2000' was very unusual in that it contained identical reprints of 6th Edition cards, while other cards in the set were essentially reprints of Starter 1999 cards, without an expansion symbol. Like other Starter level products, the set contained bare vanilla creatures, simple sorceries, and basic lands. Starter 2000 was only released in a series of theme decks, and has become very hard to find due to its limited print run and sales. Also adding to its appeal for experienced players and making it harder to find, each pack contained a rare 5th Edition City of Brass, which was, and in many formats still is, essential to many tournament decks. Each theme deck shipped with a CD-ROM that gave new players step by step instruction to learn the game of Magic, using the cards that they unpacked as a guide. The theme decks also contained limited edition promo foil cards from Nemesis, Rhox, with alternate art that would be later used in 10th Edition. The next release of the Starter product line was included under the 7th Edition banner, known as 7th Edition Starter, and would contain similar theme decks.

== Mechanics ==
No new mechanics were introduced with Starter. It omitted elements unnecessary for basic gameplay, such as artifacts, enchantments, and complicated abilities.
