= Innistrad: Midnight Hunt =

- Released: September 24, 2021
- Size: 424 cards
- Keywords: Daybound/Nightbound, Decayed
- Mechanics: Day/Night, Disturb, Flashback, Coven, transforming double-faced cards
- Development code: Golf
- Expansion code: MID
← Adventures in the Forgotten Realms	Innistrad: Crimson Vow →

Innistrad: Midnight Hunt is an expansion of the Magic: The Gathering card game. It was released on September 24, 2021. The set returns to the plane of Innistrad, where in the wake of Avacyn's demise and the chaos caused by Emrakul, humans have once again become prey for the various monsters that inhabit the plane. The story revolves around the nights growing longer and the days growing shorter, and the humans' attempt to solve it.

== Mechanics ==
The set features a number of new and returning game mechanics. A featured mechanic of the set is Day/Night; some cards have different effects depending on whether it the game is in Day or night, and some cards will be appropriately transformed (flipped to its opposite side) as well.

The new mechanics are as follows:

- Daybound/Nightbound: appears on werewolves in the set. Whenever it becomes day or night, the card is flipped to its day/night side
- Disturb: a card with this ability lets you cast it from the graveyard, transformed
- Coven: gives a benefit for having three or more creatures with different powers
- Decayed: a creature with this ability can't block and must be sacrificed after combat

These are the returning mechanics:

- Flashback: lets you cast an instant or sorcery card again from your graveyard
- Transforming double-faced cards: cards that game rules on either side, and have some effect that lets the player switch between them.
