= Innistrad: Crimson Vow =

Magic: The Gathering expansion set

- Released: November 19, 2021
- Size: 487 cards
- Keywords: Daybound/Nightbound, Training, Exploit, Soulbound
- Mechanics: Day/Night, Disturb, Cleave, Blood tokens, transforming double-faced cards
- Development code: Clubs
- Expansion code: Vow
← Innistrad: Midnight Hunt	Kamigawa: Neon Dynasty →

Innistrad: Crimson Vow is an expansion of the Magic: The Gathering card game. It was released on November 19, 2021. The set's story continues some time after the point where it left off in Innistrad: Midnight Hunt (an eternal night and the key to ending it stolen). Humans settlements are suffering under vampiric rule, and the vampiress Olivia Voldaren is planning on marrying Edgar Markov, grandfather of the famous planeswalker Sorin Markov, as part of her plan to rule all of Innistrad.
