= Planechase =

Variant of Magic: The Gathering

- Released: September 4th, 2009
- Size: Four 60-card decks, 40 oversized Plane cards
- Designers: Brian Tinsman (lead), Aaron Forsythe, Peter Knudson, Kenneth Nagle
- Developers: Mike Turian (lead), Dave Guskin, Peter Knudson, Scott Larabee, Mark Purvis, Mark L. Gottlieb

Planechase is a card game and a variant of Magic: The Gathering with an emphasis on multi-player games. The set utilizes new oversized Plane cards, cards that are based on various locations (Planes) within the Magic multiverse, to modify the rules of gameplay.

== Gameplay ==
To play a game of Planechase, each player needs their own planar deck, consisting of at least 10 different oversized cards. The players may also use a "shared planar deck," which requires ten cards per player. Players cannot use more than one plane with any given name. When the game begins, the player going first reveals the top of their planar deck (or the shared planar deck), which is the plane the game starts on. Each plane card has a name, a type, one ability that applies at all times (either to all players or to whoever is the turn player at the time), and one "Chaos" ability.

Players also need a six-sided die, called the "planar die." Each Planechase preconstructed deck comes with a "planar die" that has four blank faces, one "Planeswalk" face with the "Planeswalker" symbol, and one "Chaos" face with its own symbol unique to Planechase. During a player's main phase, that player can roll the planar die, with three possible outcomes. A blank roll of the planar die does nothing. If "Chaos" is rolled, the "Chaos" ability of the current plane card triggers. If the "planeswalk" symbol is rolled, the player "planeswalks away" from the current plane (put it on the bottom of its owner's planar deck) and reveals the top card of their planar deck, which becomes the new plane that has been "planeswalked to." Players can roll the planar die as many times as desired, but successive rolls cost an additional one mana for each time the planar die has been rolled this turn.

Other than the above, the normal rules of the game are followed, and Planechase can be adapted to any multiplayer variant.

Planechase 2012 introduced the "phenomenon" card type. A player may have up to two different phenomenon cards in their planar deck, which cannot have the same name. Player planeswalking to a phenomenon follow the instructions on the card and then immediately planeswalks away from it.

== 2009 release ==
Four game packs were released on September 4, 2009: "Elemental Thunder", "Metallic Dreams", "Strike Force", and "Zombie Empire". Each game pack comes with a 60-card preconstructed deck, 10 plane cards, a planar die, and multi-player rules. The cards within each preconstructed deck are all reprints from various Magic sets (except for one card in each deck which was a "pre-print" from the upcoming Zendikar expansion). All of the cards are black bordered and tournament legal in their original formats.

== 2012 release ==
Four new Planechase game packs were released on June 1, 2012. Each comes with a 60-card preconstructed deck, 8 all-new plane cards, two phenomenon cards, a planar die, and multi-player rules. Unlike the original Planechase release, these decks contain 21 new cards spread among them. Each of the new decks highlights a returning mechanic from Magic's history.

- "Chaos Reigns" is a five-color deck built around cascade, from Alara Reborn.
- "Night of the Ninja" is a blue-black deck built around Ninjas and ninjutsu, from Betrayers of Kamigawa.
- "Primordial Hunger" is a red-green deck built around devour, from Shards of Alara.
- "Savage Auras" is a green-white deck built around Auras and totem armor, from Rise of the Eldrazi.
