= Magic: The Gathering Commander =

Series of supplemental Magic: the Gathering card game products

Commander
- Released: June 17, 2011
- Size: Five 100-card decks, including 51 new cards
- Designers: Ken Nagle (Lead), Mark Gottlieb, Scott Larabee, Ryan Miller, Mark Purvis
- Developers: Mark Globus (Lead), Peter Knudson, Erik Lauer, Ryan Miller, Lee Sharpe
- Development code: Bedlam

Commander is a series of supplemental Magic: the Gathering card game products. Its mechanics are derived from a fan-created format known as "Elder Dragon Highlander (EDH)".

The Commander format has each player provide a 100-card deck, using cards from any printed sets excluding those that are banned, with the requirement that each card outside basic lands must be unique, in contrast to normal Magic decks that allow up to four copies of a card from the game's current base and expansion sets. The Commander format serves as a casual alternative to normal competitive play.

The official Commander format was initially "the only sanctioned format maintained by an outside entity" other than Wizards of the Coast. While the Commander format had been overseen by a volunteer group of players since its inception, the group voluntarily turned over management of the format to Wizards of the Coast in September 2024 following player controversy over certain card bans.

== History ==
=== Elder Dragon Highlander ===
The original fan-created format, Elder Dragon Highlander (EDH), was developed by Adam Staley in the late 1990s and became a staple of his local play groups in Alaska. Staley's original name was "a tribute to the line 'there can be only one' spoken repeatedly in the 1986 film Highlander", evoking the idea of a battle royale and that there could only be one of a given type of card in a player's deck. The first part of the name referenced the Elder Dragons in the Magic storyline. However, Polygon highlighted that there is some contention on the creative origins of the format as The Duelist also published a multiplayer format in July 1996 called "Elder Legend Dragon Wars" which was shared with the magazine by reader Jesus M. Lopez who claimed he had designed this format. When asked by Polygon, Staley said "I do not remember reading that article. Some things are similar to my version and some are very different".

Sheldon Menery, who was first introduced to EDH in 2002, while stationed at Elmendorf Air Force Base, then developed the format further culminating in his 2004 article, outlining the format on the Magic fan site Star City Games which "spread the word about it beyond his circle of judges for the first time". This format differed in several ways such as an expanded deck size and a larger health total. Scott Larabee, the Wizards of the Coast's Pro Tour manager, played the format for the first time in 2005 with one of Menery's decks at a tournament. In the following year, Menery along with other Pro Tour judges, Gavin Duggan and Duncan McGregor, created a rules committee with an official website.

=== Commander ===
Larabee went on to advocate for the format within Wizards of the Coast which led to the commercial launch of the format in 2011. The EDH name was changed due to intellectual property concerns. Since 2011, Wizards of the Coast has released a product line containing preconstructed Commander decks. However, the format was initially maintained by the Commander Rules Committee (CRC) which was run independently of Wizards of the Coast. In 2020, Wizards of the Coast released metrics from stores in its Wizards Play Network (WPN) on the total number of participants in Magic events (referred to as Tickets). Per the industry trade ICv2:

...the number of unique players attending Commander events per week at WPN stores went from 9,000 in 2018 to 28,000 in 2020. In February 2020, all stores that ran events were averaging 1846 Tickets per year. However, stores that ran Commander events averaged about 2111 Tickets per year which is a 12.6% increase over the stores not running Commander. [...] Commander is clearly a growing format and is driving [organized play] numbers upward [...]. On a final note, for stores that carry singles, Reserved List Commander cards have been on a tear lately. [...] The market price sits at around $600.00 which represents more than a 45% increase in value in only about nine months"

In 2020 during the COVID-19 pandemic, Wizards of the Coast partnered on a webcam version of Magic: The Gathering playable online called SpellTable, which allows remote play of the Commander format. In 2021, Dot eSports highlighted that "Commander has become one of the biggest formats in Magic over the past five years, even leading to Wizards of the Coast dubbing 2020 as 'The Year of Commander.' The format is a boon for novice and experienced deckbuilders to craft thematic decks centered around Magic's over 1,200 Legendary creatures".

On September 23rd, 2024, the CRC announced that four cards were being added to the banlist for the Commander format which sparked immediate backlash from the community. James Whitbrook of Gizmodo characterized the community response as "heated" due to the aftermarket value of the banned cards and their "popularity in competitive play". Josh Lee Kwai, a member of the Commander Advisory Group (CAG) which supported the CRC, resigned following the banlist announcement. However, "things took a turn for the worse" when the reaction started to target members of the CRC individually. On September 30, 2024, the CRC officially gave "management of the Commander format to the game design team of Wizards of the Coast". Wizards of the Coast stated that "the task of managing Commander has far outgrown the scope and safety of being attached to any five people". The CRC explained that the level of vitriol in the ban backlash, which included death threats, made it "impossible" for the CRC "to continue operating as an independent entity". Chase Carter of Rascal commented that this move is a "great and necessary solution" due to the level of harassment the CRC received, however, he was concerned about the long term health of the format with Wizards of the Coast presiding "as Commander's creator and arbitrator" which many felt "threatens the spirit of the format. If the company's weird bracket system suggestion is any indication of their stewardship, these first months could prove especially rough". Ash Parrish of The Verge similarly noted concerns that since Wizards of the Coast now controls the banlist, "there's nothing preventing it from continuing to print powerful, format-degrading cards in service of increased sales".

==== Commander Format Panel ====
On October 22, 2024, Wizards of the Coast announced the Commander Format Panel (CFP) as a replacement for the CRC. The CFP is a rotating group of 17 notable Magic players and content creators. Several members of the CFP were either part of the CRC or the CAG. The goal in creating this panel was to "hear the full range of the Commander spectrum, from players who prefer extremely casual decks to 'cEDH' (competitive Commander) players." Principal game designer Gavin Verhey stated that while the Wizards of the Coast designers will make the ultimate "final calls" on the format, he expects "that most of the time majority opinion on the panel will win out".

=== Oathbreaker ===
In March 2023, Wizards of the Coast officially launched the Oathbreaker format, which originated as a fan-created variation of Commander. It was created "around 2017" by the Weirdcards Charitable Club, a Minnesota-based gaming group, before becoming an officially supported format. The Oathbreaker format features an instant or sorcery "Signature Spell", and decks have only 60 cards.

== Gameplay ==
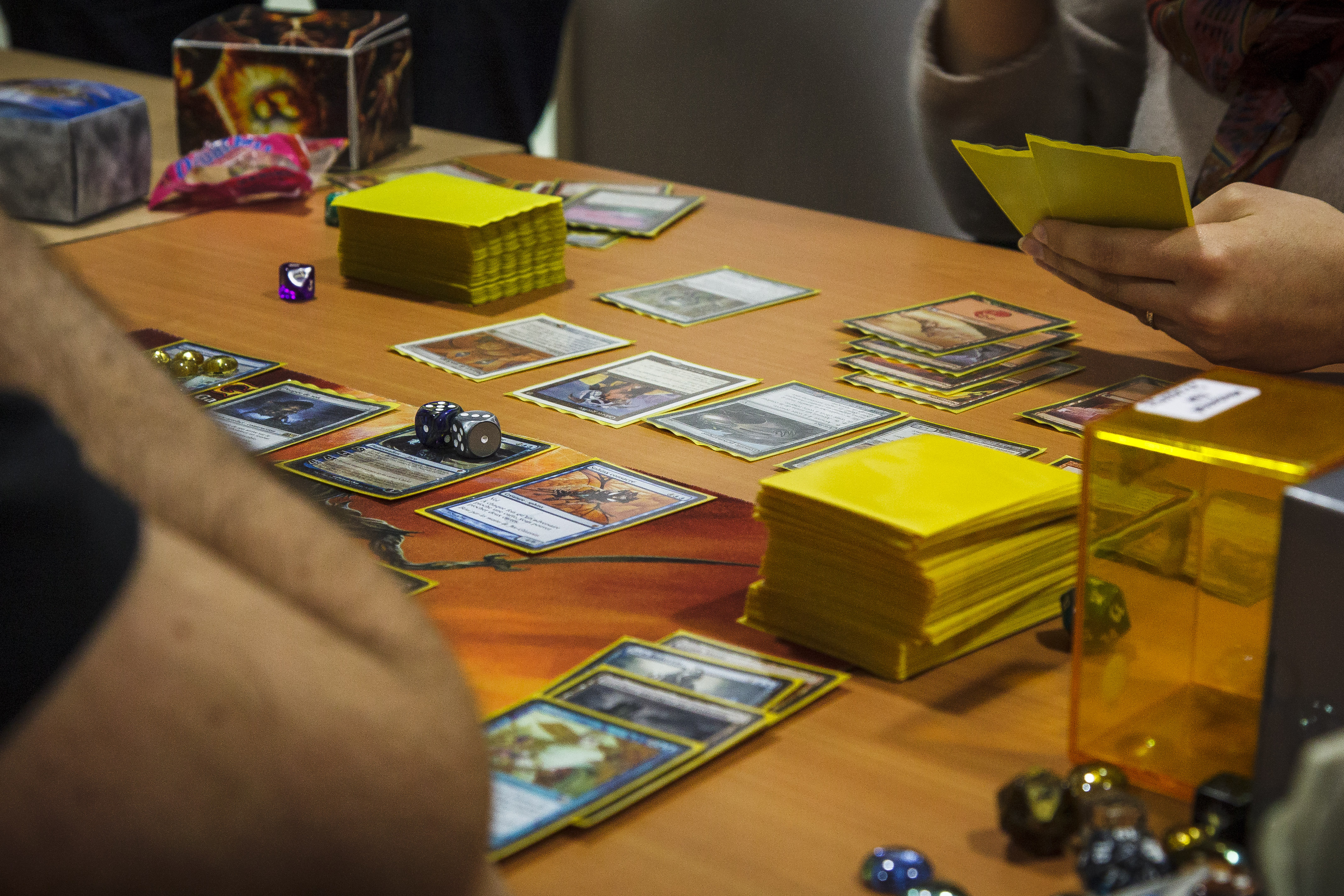
A game of Commander in progress

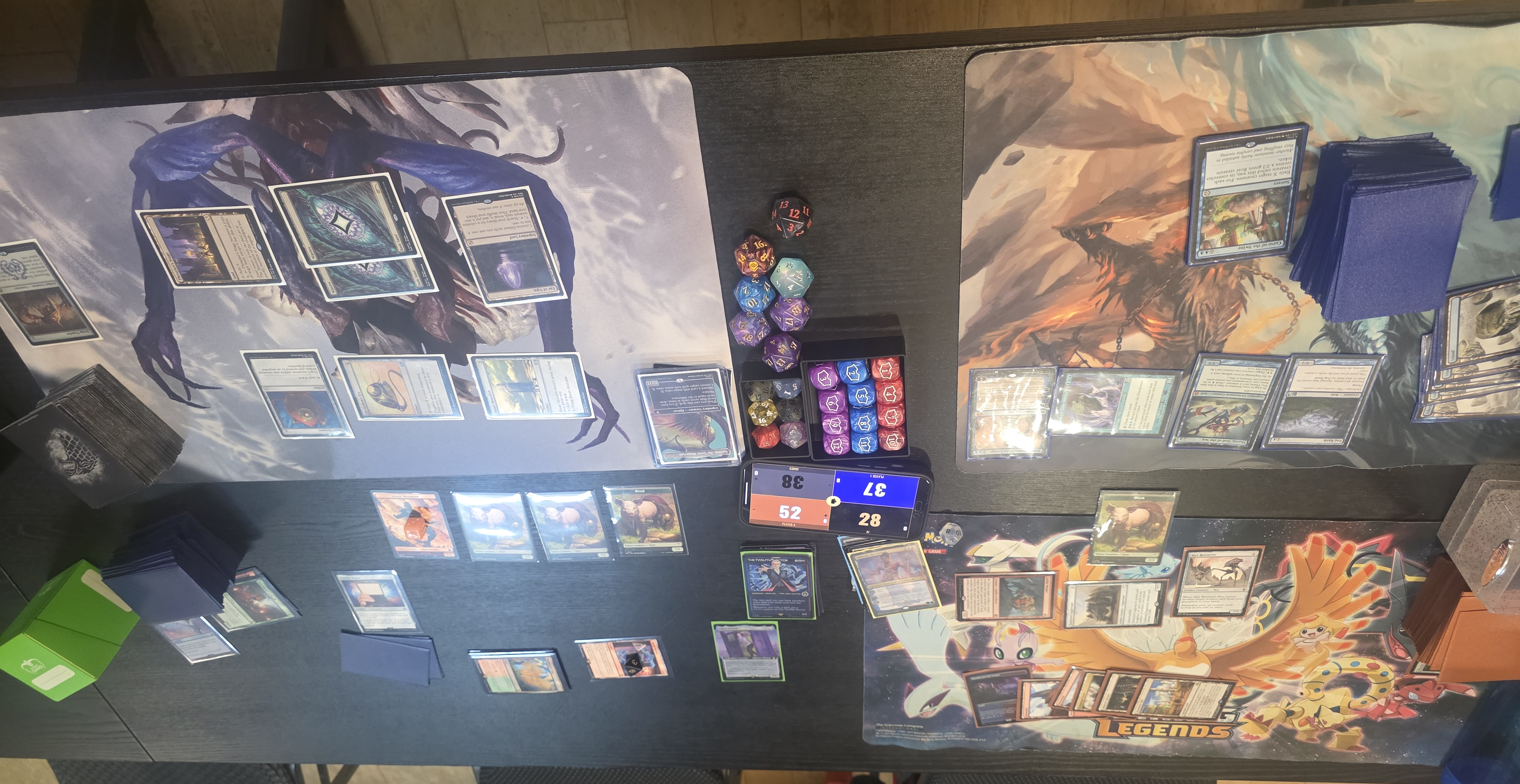
Commander layout with four players

Commander is a format where players construct 100-card decks, with each card (except basic lands) appearing no more than once. The format is primarily played with four players, each with their own deck. Players also choose a legendary creature or Planeswalker to be their "Commander" or "General" (a Planeswalker must be designated as allowed to be used as a Commander), which begins the game in the "Command Zone", from where it can cast directly to the battlefield. Each player's deck is based and built around their Commander's colors. If a commander leaves the battlefield, it may return to the Command Zone and can be cast again, costing an additional two mana for each previous cast.

In addition to the same losing conditions that exist in a normal game of Magic, each player starts the game with 40 life points instead of 20, and a player may lose if they are dealt 21 or more total points of combat damage from a single Commander throughout the game. The format "supports two to six players, sometimes more".

Commander also has its own "banned list" of cards, separate from any other format which was curated by the Commander Rules Committee. This committee also maintained the rules for the format. A list of the recommended banned cards in the format can also be found on the Wizards of the Coast official website.

== Variants ==
- Competitive EDH, also known as cEDH, is a distinct form of EDH, with the same rules as EDH. Competitive EDH has the same rules and banlist as Commander but it differs in that it has no restrictions on its own strategies, forgoing the typical social contracts in favor of pursuing the most optimal strategies to win.
- Duel Commander, also known as French Commander, got its origins from Magic judge Kevin Desprez, who brought the initial idea of EDH to France from the USA, before it spread across Europe and later globally. The game is played by two combatants, each starting with 20 life points, obeys the same rules as a regular Magic game, and has one commander (or commanders with Partner ability) plus 99 (or 98 with Partners) cards in the starting library. The mulligan system is the same as for sanctioned formats, and the deck construction rules follow the same color identity rule as the multiplayer version does. It also has its own ban list and is meant to be more competitive than traditional Commander.
- Pauper Commander is a variant in which each card in the deck must be Pauper legal (had to be printed or released online at one point with a Common rarity) and the Commander must be any creature (legendary or not) that was printed or released online at least one time at Uncommon rarity. On this variation, commander damage is 16 to 18 and starting life is 30 points.
- Oathbreaker is an official variant which launched in 2023. This format is free-for-all multiplayer with three to five players who each start with 20 life; the winner is the last standing player. Each player builds a 58-card singleton deck along with selecting an "Oathbreaker (a planeswalker card) and a Signature Spell (an instant or sorcery) that matches the color identity of the Oathbreaker" to go with the deck. "The Oathbreaker and the Signature Spell start in the command zone at the beginning of each game, and can be cast during the game at their normal costs, plus an additional two mana for each time they have been cast. Both of these cards return to the command zone if they would go to the graveyard".
- Commander Box League is an official variant launched by Wizards of the Coast in 2025 for WPN stores. Each player purchases a Play Booster box and their deck construction is limited to the cards within the box.
- Commander Two-Headed Giant is an official variant launched by Wizards of the Coast in 2025. This two-on-two format is similar to the non-Commander version of Two-Headed Giant – "players pair up in teams of two, share life totals, spells, and strategy in an effort to defeat the other team".

=== Online variants ===
Magic Online 1v1 Commander is Wizards of the Coast's variant of Commander for Magic: The Gathering Online. In 2023, Wizards of the Coast added Freeform Commander to the platform; this variant removed many deckbuilding restrictions.

In 2018, Wizards of the Coast launched Brawl as a Commander variant for its online platforms. The format is commonly played as a sanctioned event on Magic: The Gathering Online and on Magic: The Gathering Arena. It was a highly requested addition to Arena but the "variant never took off on paper". The physical format was not well-received by the players due to a "shortage of preconstructed decks" and the resale price of individual cards. Brawl utilizes all cards on Arena outside of its own banlist. It has a deck size of 100 cards, and allows for the commander to be any legendary creature or any planeswalker. Brawl was originally "Historic Brawl", while Standard Brawl held the Brawl moniker. Standard Brawl utilizes all cards that are currently legal in Standard and has a rotation schedule similar to that of Standard. While similar to traditional Commander, Standard Brawl deck size is limited to 60 cards and each player starts with 30 life.

In 2020, Wizards of the Coast officially partnered with SpellTable; this online platform allows players to play against each other virtually while using their physical decks. SpellTable relies on players utilizing webcams focused on the game's tabletop zones to show gameplay using physical cards. SpellTable (formally VirtualEDH) independently launched in April 2020 as a way to continue playing the Commander format during the COVID-19 pandemic before expanding to other formats and joining Wizards of the Coast.

In November 2024, Hasbro stated that it was working on a separate Commander format video game, distinct from its current Magic: The Gathering Online or Magic: The Gathering Arena games. In August 2026, it was confirmed that Wizards of the Coast were working on introducing Commander into Magic: The Gathering Arena.

== Reception ==
In 2020, Charlie Hall, for Polygon, commented that "many Magic players see creating a Commander deck as the ultimate expression of a player's skill, and of their ability to use their personal collection of cards to its fullest. The Commander format embodies the game's reputation for competition, but also for storytelling". Jason Coles, for Dicebreaker, wrote that Commander is "possibly the most popular format in all of Magic: The Gathering [...]. It's a fun format that generally features groups of up to four players duking it out and trying to keep each other in check". Jan Švelch, in the academic journal Analog Game Studies, wrote that "the popular Commander format has been receiving yearly expansions since 2011 when the first official Commander pre-constructed decks were released. Many of these emergent formats address the more controversial aspects of the official and sanctioned Magic formats [...]. The interactions between players and developers often follow the logic of cultural convergence with popular community formats receiving official expansions. Creation of such community formats and their consequent commercialization by publishers can also be seen as a manifestation of fan labor in which fans create value which is later capitalized on by the official producers".

In 2013, Steve Heisler, for The A.V. Club, wrote that "EDH is dorky and fun. [...] But ironically, EDH is in danger of transforming into the same kind of serious, streamlined structure that its original creators wanted to avoid". Heisler was concerned that Wizards of the Coast's expansion into the casual Magic scene would recreate issues of the competitive format such as players only using the most optimal deck; additionally, he commented that the preconstructed decks add a new metagame to the format. Heisler highlighted "now there are cards created just for Commander that are inarguably better than their counterparts, and their inclusion in the pre-made decks implies you really should think about picking them up. [...] But if you're not going to use these optimal cards, you'd better get ready to play against them. [...] The metagame of Commander has largely been dictated by the collector marketplace, which itself is largely dictated by a card's demand in non-Commander settings". Heisler stated that Wizards of the Coast began to add cards to Commander decks that are more useful in the Legacy format leading to collectors buying the preconstructed decks for a single card which then led to the price of the Commander decks increasing. Heisler wrote that "by feeding Commander product into the collector-driven sludge pot, and by emphasizing the inclusion of cards that are absolutely better than others, Wizards and the Magic collector community threaten to make this format just like all the others".

In 2021, Xavier Johnson, for Dot eSports, highlighted that deck building thrives in Commander's more casual format. Johnson wrote, "Commander is a casual Constructed format that emphasizes the importance of individual playgroups setting expectations rather than adherence to a strict set of rules and a win-at-all-costs mentality. This underlying philosophy influences how players craft their Commander decks, since many players view deckbuilding as a form of self expression or a way to make use of their collections. [...] A quirk of Commander deckbuilding is the social contract and the format's focus on a fun, communal experience rather than wins and losses. This leads to certain cards being generally shunned by many playgroups". Since there is so much variety between playgroups and the focus is on the social experience, there isn't the same adherence to the metagame as there is in other formats such as Standard and Modern; optimized cards might not be used in a local playgroup because these cards are "frustrating to play against".

=== Banlist ===
Stan Golovchuk of Polygon reported that "players, game designers, Magic content creators, and – in an unusual move – even some of the game's artists took to social media to share their frustrations" following the September 2024 banlist announcement. Jeffrey Dohm-Sanchez of ICv2 stated that the response was "overwhelming negative [sic]" and included petitions to reverse the banlist decision and fire the CRC. Golovchuk explained that many consumers "were viscerally upset over the cost of these cards prior to the" banlist announcement, but following the ban, players who had "spent hundreds of dollars to enhance their decks" could no longer use these cards which left them "feeling stuck holding the bag". Ash Parrish of The Verge viewed the "heart of the issue" as the "tension between the spirit of Commander as a casual format and the commercial interests of both Wizards of the Coast and a subcommunity of players". Parrish highlighted that for this subcommunity, "Magic cards aren't so much a game to play with friends as they are an investment vehicle". Chase Carter of Rascal reported that many players largely "rejoiced" as the ban supported "the overall health of the format" but a "loud minority" who were financially motivated "voiced their upset towards" both the CRC and the CAG. Carter thought "ultimately, the past week has proven that MTG's ability to be enjoyed as a game is severely hobbled by the supposed need to prop up its secondary market".
