= Limited Edition (Magic: The Gathering) =

First Magic: The Gathering card set

Limited Edition Alpha
- Released: August 5, 1993
- Size: 295 cards (74 common 95 uncommon 116 rare 10 basic land)
- Print run: 2,600,000
- Keywords: Banding, First Strike, Flying, Landwalk, Trample, Protection
- Expansion code: LEA (LA)

Limited Edition Beta
- Released: October 1993
- Size: 302 cards (75 common, 95 uncommon, 117 rare, 15 basic land)
- Print run: 7,300,000 or 7,800,000
- Keywords: Banding, First Strike, Flying, Landwalk, Trample, Protection
- Expansion code: LEB (LB)
← Alpha	Unlimited →

Magic: The Gathering Limited Edition is the first Magic: The Gathering card set. It premiered in a limited release at Origins Game Fair in 1993, with a general release that August. The initial print run of 2.6 million cards sold out quickly, and a new printing run was released in October 1993. These two runs are known as Limited Edition Alpha and Limited Edition Beta, or just Alpha and Beta for short. Although Alpha and Beta are referred to as different sets by some, officially they are the same set; Wizards of the Coast had expected that people would not necessarily be able to tell the two press runs apart. Beta fixed a number of misprints and errors on cards. The printer accidentally used different corner rounding dies for the second run, resulting in Alpha cards being noticeably distinct in shape and appearance from Beta cards and all subsequent cards. The Beta printing also included a revised rulebook with a number of clarifications, although creator Richard Garfield's short fiction "Worzel's Tale" was removed to make room. The print run of Beta is given as 7.3 million or 7.8 million depending on the source. Despite the set's print run being about three times as big as Alpha's, Beta sold out as quickly as its predecessor.

Limited Edition cards have no expansion symbol, no copyright date, and no trademark symbols; the text on the bottom left consists only of an artist credit.

== Set history ==
Card fronts of early Magic cards: Alpha on left, Beta on right.

Originally, the designers and playtesters of the new card game intended the name would simply be "Magic". However, the lawyers at Wizards of the Coast advised that the name was too generic to be trademarked, and was thus changed to "Magic: The Gathering". The original intent was that each Magic expansion would have a different subtitle; while the first Magic set would be "The Gathering", future sets could be labeled as "Magic: Arabian Nights" or "Magic: Ice Age". When it was decided that the backs of Magic should be identical regardless of the expansion, the name "Magic: The Gathering" would appear prominently on the back of every Magic card. "Magic: The Gathering" thus became the name of the entire game instead of "The Gathering" only being the subtitle referring to the first release.

As the names Alpha and Beta only distinguish different print runs of the same set, Alpha and Beta contain largely the same cards. However, in the Alpha print run the cards Circle of Protection: Black and Volcanic Island were omitted as the art was not completed in time for the Alpha print run. As well as including these two extra cards, the Beta print run included a new illustration for each of the five basic lands, taking the total card count from 295 to 302. According to Mark Rosewater, this was done so that the product could be advertised as having "over 300 cards". Several mistakes on Alpha cards were corrected in Beta. Alpha cards are easily distinguishable from Beta cards as unlike all succeeding sets, cards from Alpha have steeply rounded corners. This was reportedly caused by sharpening of the dies used to cut the Beta cards, which resulted in the less rounded corners. The Wizards of the Coast tournament rules require that a deck including Alpha cards have opaque card sleeves to prevent a player from being able to identify the difference between an Alpha and a non-Alpha card in their library, as the corners are different from all the printings that followed.

Alpha, Beta, and Unlimited are known for having extremely powerful cards at the higher rarities. This was an intentional choice during development; the thought was that "players (...) wouldn't be able to acquire many of the power rares, because supply would keep them actually rare". Players spending hundreds of dollars to acquire multiple copies of each of the powerful rares was not anticipated at the time, as the developers assumed players would stop at around 30-50 dollars.

The Alpha rulebook contains a fantasy tale called "Worzel's Story" by Richard Garfield which was removed for the Beta release. Alpha deck boxes also lack a UPC on the bottom.

== Mechanics ==
Being the first Magic set, Limited Edition has all of the original mechanics intrinsic to Magic, such as "tapping" cards to use their abilities. Many of the original base keywords are "evergreen" and still used commonly in Magic design as of 2019, such as Flying, First Strike, and Trample. A few keywords have since been phased out of the game. The Banding ability was discontinued in the set Tempest, released in 1997. According to the Wizards of the Coast designers, the Banding mechanic confused players and required too much text to explain. When old mechanics were revisited in the Time Spiral block, banding was left out for this same reason. Much later, regeneration and "landwalk" (e.g. Forestwalk, Swampwalk) were discontinued. Landwalk was removed in 2015 with the release of Magic Origins, and no more Regeneration cards have been created starting with the Shadows over Innistrad block in 2016.

Many Limited Edition cards had abilities that have since become keyword abilities. The ability "may only be blocked by black or artifact creatures" was recast as the keyword Fear in 8th Edition which was replaced by Intimidate with the release of Zendikar. A rule in Limited Edition that prevented Walls from attacking was removed in 9th Edition and all walls were given the new keyword "Defender", which prevents them from attacking. Serra Angel's ability "doesn't tap to attack" was recast as the keyword Vigilance in Champions of Kamigawa. "May attack the turn it comes into play" has changed twice; it was first changed to "unaffected by summoning sickness" in Mirage and then replaced with the keyword Haste in Urza's Destiny.

The rules of Limited Edition included a provision for ante. Games would be started by each player removing a card at random from their deck. The winner of the game took both cards. There were also cards that interacted with the ante, such as Contract From Below. This aspect of the game continued until the Homelands set in 1995, but was dropped as the cards became collectible and valuable and the company did not want to be associated with gambling.

Limited Edition included a number of unique cards exploring mechanics rarely seen in later sets. Chaos Orb is a card involving dexterity, in which the card is flipped onto the play area to determine cards destroyed by the Orb. Both manual dexterity cards such as Chaos Orb and ante cards are banned in all sanctioned Magic formats as of 2025.

== Notable cards ==
- The "Power Nine": Black Lotus, Mox Pearl, Mox Sapphire, Mox Jet, Mox Ruby, Mox Emerald, Ancestral Recall, Time Walk, and Timetwister. These are widely considered the most powerful cards in Limited Edition, and are among the most powerful in all of Magic: The Gathering. All of these cards are now restricted in tournament play; players may only include one copy of each in a deck. The color distribution of the Power Nine is heavily skewed; six of the cards are Artifacts, while the other three are Blue cards. In April 2016, an Alpha Black Lotus card graded as a 9.5 out of 10 was sold on eBay for $38,000; on February 27, 2019, a Black Lotus graded 9.5 out of 10 was sold in auction for $166,100. And prices continue upward over time. There was a record breaking $3,000,000 sale of an Alpha CGC 10 in 2024.
- The Dual Lands: Tundra, Underground Sea, Badlands, Taiga, Savannah, Scrubland, Bayou, Tropical Island, Plateau, and Volcanic Island. These lands provide two colors of mana with the benefit of possessing two basic land types, an uncommon trait on non-basic lands. All future dual lands would be printed with restrictions. They are now a defining part of the Legacy and Vintage formats, in particular for their ability to be found by the various "fetchlands" (for example, Flooded Strand) released many years later.
- The "Boons": Healing Salve, Ancestral Recall, Dark Ritual, Lightning Bolt, and Giant Growth. This was the first and most famous cycle in Magic. All of them provided an effect in the number three. The cards defined the core ability of each color, but they proved to be disparate in power; the Blue Boon, Ancestral Recall, was considered the strongest, and was the only card in the cycle printed as a Rare. The green boon, Giant Growth, was considered an iconic card of Green and had appeared in every core set until the printing of Magic 2012. Many modern variations on the other cards have been printed, including Mending Hands, Concentrate, Cabal Ritual, and Shock.
- Chaos Orb: The first Magic card that required manual dexterity as part of the game play. The only other such card not in Unglued or Unhinged, or Unstable (Magic: The Gathering), or any other joke set was Falling Star, from Legends. These two cards are currently banned in all sanctioned tournament formats.

=== Errors in Alpha ===
Alpha contained numerous misprints and did not adhere to close standardized wordings for similar effects seen in later sets and printings. The following cards had printing errors, most of which were fixed in the Beta release.

- Circle of Protection: Black was accidentally omitted from the set.
- Cyclopean Tomb had no casting cost, instead of a casting cost of 4.
- Death Ward incorrectly credited Dan Frazier as the artist. The correct artist is Mark Poole.
- Demonic Hordes was printed with the letter B in its text box rather than the black mana symbol.
- Drain Life was printed with the letter B in its text box rather than the black mana symbol.
- Elvish Archers had its power/toughness listed as 1/2 rather than 2/1.
- Force of Nature was printed with the letter G in its text box rather than the green mana symbol, and the artist's name was spelled incorrectly.
- Orcish Artillery had a casting cost of 1R rather than 1RR.
- Orcish Oriflamme had a casting cost of 1R rather than 3R.
- Phantasmal Forces was printed with the letter U in its text box rather than the blue mana symbol.
- Rock Hydra was printed with the letter R in its text box rather than the red mana symbol.
- Red Elemental Blast was printed as an instant rather than an interrupt (see this version), making half of its ability unplayable under the rules of the time.
- Sedge Troll incorrectly credited Jeff A. Menges as the artist. The correct artist is Dan Frazier.
- Tropical Island credited Mark Poole as the artist instead of Jesper Myrfors. This was corrected in the Beta printing.
- Unsummon states that enchantments on the unsummoned card are "CARDed" instead of discarded.
- Volcanic Island was accidentally omitted from Alpha and only appears in Beta.
- The name of artist Douglas Shuler is generally misspelled as "Douglas Schuler". The mistake was not fixed until Revised Edition.
- Birds of Paradise had a typo in its rules text.

Several Alpha cards have other minor mistakes, most of them relating to the font.
