= Shadowmoor =

Block of expansion sets in Magic: The Gathering

Shadowmoor is a Magic: The Gathering block consisting of the expansion sets Shadowmoor (released May 2, 2008) and Eventide (released July 25, 2008). The block was originally conceived as a single set that was to be released as the third in the Lorwyn block, but it was ultimately released as a semi-independent two-set block. Shadowmoor was linked thematically to Lorwyn, and the four sets comprising the two blocks rotated through official tournament formats together.

== Shadowmoor ==
Shadowmoor
- Reaper King
- Released: May 2, 2008
- Size: 301 (80 rare, 80 uncommon, 121 common, 20 basic lands)
- Keywords: Persist, Wither, Conspire
- Mechanics: Hybrid mana, −1/−1 counters, untap symbol
- Designers: Mark Rosewater (lead), Sean Fletcher, Mark Gottlieb, Devin Low, Ken Troop
- Developers: Aaron Forsythe (lead), Devin Low, Alexis Janson, Matt Place, Jake Theis, Steve Warner, Doug Beyer
- Development code: Jelly
- Expansion code: SHM

First set in the Shadowmoor block
Shadowmoor	Eventide
← Morningtide	Eventide →
← Lorwyn Block	Alara Block →

=== Set details ===
Shadowmoor is the first set of the Shadowmoor block, which started May 2008. Shadowmoor is the first large expansion to be released in a month other than October since Ice Age’s June 1995 release. The designers of the set are Mark Rosewater (lead), Sean Fletcher, Mark Gottlieb, Devin Low, and Ken Troop; the developers of the set are Aaron Forsythe (lead), Devin Low, Alexis Janson (the winner of The Great Designer Search Contest), Matt Place, Jake Theis, Steve Warner, and Doug Beyer. The Shadowmoor symbol might suggest a bat wing or dead leaf, but is a Jack-o'-lantern lid taken from the art of the card Reaper King, the King of the scarecrows, a prominent creature type in the set. The set's theme is color, utilizing hybrid (introduced and last seen in the Ravnica block) across the allied color pairs, along with innovations in hybrid mana. A new action is introduced in this set, called "Q", representing the untap symbol; according to Rosewater, this has "never [been] done before." Rosewater also stated that "the set plays into the duality theme between Lorwyn and Shadowmoor blocks, both in the art and the mechanics." For example, the same creature types from Lorwyn returned.

The set plays on the same plane as Lorwyn, but due to an event called the Aurora, the plane and its inhabitants are twisted and changed. The art of Shadowmoor's booster packs depicts familiar Lorwyn creatures either during or after a dark change. As such, there are a number of mirrors between the Lorwyn and Shadowmoor blocks (For example, Lorwyn focuses on tapping and +1/+1 counters, while Shadowmoor focuses on untapping and −1/−1 counters)

More than 25 cycles have been identified in this set, including a number of "mega-cycles" that include five allied-colored cards from Shadowmoor and five enemy-colored cards from Eventide. Rosewater has noted that the set is a "little cycle heavy".

Five theme decks were released as part of the set. The preconstructed theme decks are: "Aura Mastery" (White/Blue), "Mortal Coil" (Blue/Black), "Army of Entropy" (Black/Red), "Overkill" (Red/Green), and "Turnabout" (White/Green).

=== Mechanics ===
Shadowmoor introduced the mechanics conspire, persist, untap and wither.

- Conspire - When you play a spell with conspire, you may tap two creatures that share a color with it to copy the spell, choosing new targets if desired.
- Persist - When a creature with persist is put into a graveyard from play, if it had no −1/−1 counters on it, it returns to play under its owner's control with a −1/−1 counter on it.
- Untap - The untap keyword action now has a symbolic representation which only appears in costs of activated abilities.
- Wither - A creature with wither deals damage to creatures in the form of −1/−1 counters.

Shadowmoor also introduced the monocolor hybrid mana symbol, a hybrid symbol displaying a number and a color mana symbol can be paid for with either the number of colorless mana depicted or the colored mana. The converted mana cost of these cards is the highest possible cost that they can be paid for with. Examples of this are shown in a cycle including cards such as Tower Above and Beseech the Queen. Reaper King also has a monocolor hybrid mana in its manacost, but it has one monocolor hybrid mana symbol for each color, making it the only multicolored card with all of the monocolor hybrid symbols.

== Eventide ==
Eventide
- eclipsed sun
- Released: July 25, 2008
- Size: 180 cards (60 Rare, 60 Uncommon, 60 Common)
- Keywords: Chroma, Retrace
- Mechanics: Hybrid Enemy Colors
- Designers: Mark Rosewater (lead), Alexis Janson, Kenneth Nagle, Jake Theis, Brian Tinsman
- Developers: Matt Place (lead), Nate Heiss, Erik Lauer, Kenneth Nagle, Mike Turian
- Development code: Doughnut
- Expansion code: EVE

Second set in the Shadowmoor block
Shadowmoor	Eventide
← Shadowmoor	Masters Edition II →
← Lorwyn Block	Alara Block →

=== Set Details ===
Five theme decks were released as part of Eventide. The preconstructed theme decks are: "Life Drain" (White/Black), "Sidestep" (Blue/Red), "Death March" (Black/Green), "Battle Blitz" (Red/White), and "Superabundance" (Green/Blue). The Eventide booster packs also include a rules card/token card in addition to the normal 15 game cards.

=== Mechanics ===
Eventide continues the block theme of hybrid cards and color matters that Shadowmoor started, as well as further use of the Wither and Persist key words. Where Shadowmoor focused on allied color hybrids, Eventide focuses on enemy color hybrid cards. Eventide also introduces two new mechanics:

- Chroma: this ability word makes the number of mana symbols of a particular color a variable which determines the effect of a card. One card from Eventide, Phosphorescent Feast, had already appeared in Future Sight, but without using the ability word Chroma.
- Retrace: this ability allows one to play a card out of one's graveyard with an added cost of discarding a land.

== Storyline ==
The narrative picks up where the Lorwyn block storyline left off.

During one particular manifestation of the Great Aurora (a recurring tri-centennial event that transform the peaceful inhabitants of Lorwyn into negative versions of themselves, in which they cannot remember their former selves), the Faerie race appear to be unaffected. It is revealed that the queen of the Faerie, Oona, is the one responsible for the dramatic transformation of Lorwyn into Shadowmoor, and vice versa.

In the story of the previous block Time Spiral, there was a much worse cataclysmic event known as the Mending, which had caused rifts in time-space as well as a significant reduction of magic power used by Planeswalkers. The time discontinuity also influences the Lorwyn plane, causing the Aurora to manifest much earlier than expected, out the control of Oona.

As a precaution not to forget her memories, Oona destroys a female elf named Maralen and magically replaces her with a duplicate: this ensures that Oona will not forget her memories and remain the ever-aware queen of Lorwyn. However, the duplicate rebels and begins her own agenda.

With the help of a male elf named Rhys, a fire spirit named Ashling, as well as a duplicitous trio of Faeries, the Maralen duplicate regains her memories and thwarts Oona in the conclusion of the story. Maralen then become the queen of the Faerie.

== Notable cards ==
Notable cards from Shadowmoor include Kitchen Finks, Painter's Servant and Reaper King

Notable cards from Eventide include Figure of Destiny and Overbeing of Myth.

There were two notable "mega-cycles" from the Shadowmoor block. One of these was the hybrid land cycle (Flooded Grove), and the other was the liege cycle (Creakwood Liege).
