= Streets of New Capenna =

Block of expansion sets in Magic: The Gathering

- Released: April 29, 2022
- Development code: Ice skating
- Expansion code: SNC
← Kamigawa: Neon Dynasty	Dominaria United →

Streets of New Capenna is an expansion set for Magic: The Gathering that was released in April 2022.

== Gameplay ==
The expansion set is set in a plane called New Capenna controlled by five demonic organized crime families akin to the Five Families, with themes from Prohibition and the Roaring Twenties. The five demonic families each belong to a shard within the plane, a concept established in Shards of Alara in which cards in each shard have a principal color and two allied colors, as well as their own keyword mechanics or themes. It enables this by "fixing" mana production with card cycles and Treasure tokens. It includes a set of triomes, land cards that can be tapped to generate one of three colors of mana.

The five families are:

- the Brokers (green, white, and blue), a corrupt legal company with belief in the impending end of New Capenna acting as a protection racket
- the Cabaretti (red, green, and white), a group of druids and monsters who party and attempt to sway public opinion
- the Maestros (blue, black, and red), an aristocratic group of elite assassins and thieves
- the Obscura (white, blue, and black), mystics who deceive and engage in blackmail
- the Riveteers (black, red, and green), a rowdy group of artisans and workers

The Brokers were initially intended as a law enforcement group, but transformed into the corrupted legal entity during development of the set.

The set includes a number of keywords, including Hideaway, first used in Lorwyn, that enables a player to look at a number of cards at the top of their library.

== Art ==
Printed cards have different artistic styles. The land triomes are printed with the typical card frame, a full-art frame, and the "skyscraper" style introduced for this set. The "golden age" frame is applied to 45 tri-color cards in the set, and the foils have a distinct gilded, metallic sheen.

== Reception ==
Writing for Paste, Cameron Kunzelman states that the set is "weirdly experimental on the creative side". In TheGamer, Joe Parlock states that the Art Deco setting is "vastly different from the high fantasy" typical of Magic.

Stan Golovchuk states in a Polygon article that the set has aesthetics inspired by the 1927 film Metropolis.

Head designer Mark Rosewater stated "fans enjoyed the look and feel of the plane" but that "The plane was a little one-note, and the factions weren't distinct enough."
