= Lorwyn =

Block of expansion sets in Magic: The Gathering

The Lorwyn block is a Magic: The Gathering expert-level block consisting of two sets: Lorwyn (October 2007) and Morningtide (February 2008). A third set, codenamed "Jelly", was originally planned as part of the Lorwyn block, but partway into the design of Lorwyn, it was split into a two-set block. Jelly was revealed as Shadowmoor, the first set of the new two-set block. The two blocks were linked together and rotated through the official tournament formats as a single, four-expansion unit. The primary theme of the Lorwyn block is tribalism.

== Set details ==
=== Lorwyn ===
Lorwyn
- Elf ear/Leaf
- Released: October 12, 2007
- Size: 301 Cards (80 rare, 80 uncommon, 121 common, 20 basic lands)
- Keywords: Champion, Evoke, Clash, Changeling, Hideaway
- Mechanics: Planeswalker cardtype, Tribal by Race
- Designers: Aaron Forsythe (lead), Mark Rosewater, Paul Sottosanti, Brady Dommermuth, Nate Heiss, Andrew Finch
- Developers: Devin Low (lead), Bill Rose, Matt Place, Henry Stern, Mike Turian, Doug Beyer
- Development code: Peanut
- Expansion code: LRW

First set in the Lorwyn block
Lorwyn	Morningtide
← Masters Edition	Morningtide →
← Time Spiral Block	Shadowmoor Block →

The designers of the set were Aaron Forsythe (lead designer), Mark Rosewater, Paul Sottosanti, Brady Dommermuth, Nate Heiss, and Andrew Finch; the developers of the set were Devin Low (lead developer), Bill Rose, Matt Place, Henry Stern, Mike Turian, and Doug Beyer.

Lorwyn is set in a more traditional fantasy world, inspired by Welsh folklore. The plane is a pastoral world inhabited by several major races: boggarts (goblins), faeries, elves, giants, treefolk, merfolk, elementals (including the flamekin) and kithkin.

Five theme decks have been released as part of the set, one more than the standard four-per-expansion, which had been a long-time trend. The preconstructed theme decks are: "Kithkin Militia" (White), "Merrow Riverways" (White/Blue), "Boggarts' Feast" (Black/Red), "Elvish Predation" (Black/Green), and "Elementals' Path" (White/Blue/Black/Red/Green).

=== Morningtide ===
Morningtide
- Released: February 1, 2008
- Size: 150 cards (50 rare, 40 uncommon, 60 common)
- Keywords: Prowl, Reinforce, and Kinship
- Mechanics: Tribal by Class
- Designers: Paul Sottosanti (lead), Aaron Forsythe, Erik Lauer, Mark Rosewater, Kenneth Nagle
- Developers: Mike Turian (lead), Erik Lauer, Henry Stern, Noah Weil
- Development code: Butter
- Expansion code: MOR

Second set in the Lorwyn block
Lorwyn	Morningtide
← Lorwyn	Shadowmoor →
← Time Spiral Block	Shadowmoor Block →

As revealed in an advertisement in the trade publication ICv2 and later confirmed by Mark Rosewater in his column, Morningtide expanded upon Lorwyn’s flavor and theme by focusing on at least five classes (Soldiers, Shamans, Wizards, Warriors, and Rogues) as well as a few minor class-based tribes (Druids, Archers, Knights, Clerics, and Assassins) in addition to the eight races of Lorwyn (Kithkin, Merfolk, Faeries, Elementals [Flamekin and Greater], Goblins, Giants, Treefolk, and Elves). Additionally, the three new mechanics keywords Prowl, Reinforce, and Kinship were introduced in this expansion.

Four preconstructed theme decks were released as part of the set. The theme decks are "Battalion" (White/Blue), "Going Rogue" (Blue/Black), "Shamanism" (White/Black/Green), and "Warrior's Code" (Red/Green).

=== Tribal ===
The block has a tribal theme, now referred to in game as kindred, which focuses heavily on creature subtypes. The tribes of Lorwyn are composed of eight primary creature types. Each of these are represented by a primary color, as well as one or two others:

Creature type (Race)	Tribe name	Primary Color	Secondary Color(s)
Goblins	Boggarts	Black	Red
Elves		Green	Black
Merfolk	Merrow	Blue	White
Kithkin		White	Green
Elementals	Flamekin (in red); Greater Elementals (in all five)	Red	All other colors
Faeries	Fae	Blue	Black
Giants		Red	White
Treefolk		Green	Black and White

== Mechanics ==
Lorwyn saw the release of an entirely new card type, the Planeswalker. This marked the first time that Wizards of the Coast added a new card type to the game since the initial Magic: The Gathering release Alpha, other than the type "Tribal". A single tribal card, Bound in Silence, was printed as a future-shifted card in Future Sight. Another significant creature type is the shapeshifter type, all of which have the ability "changeling". Creature cards with the changeling ability have all creature types. This plays into the tribal mechanics which grants bonuses to specific creature types. Though these changelings count as humans for the purposes of the rules, no humans are found in the world of Lorwyn, or are printed on the cards. This set marked another fundamental change of the game, as this was the first set to have no humans since their introduction as a creature subtype in Mirrodin. (Although humans had been in all sets since the beginning of the game, they did not have their own subtype until Mirrodin, instead only having subtypes based on their classes.) However, several of the planeswalkers, although they have no creature type, are physically humans.

The Lorwyn block features the new keywords champion, clash, evoke, and hideaway. When a creature with Champion [a type] comes into play, it is sacrificed unless another creature of that type the player controls is removed from the game (that card is returned to play when the card with champion leaves). Clash involves two players revealing the top cards of the libraries. The person who reveals the card with the highest mana cost wins the clash and gets a bonus on the card played. If a creature is played by paying its Evoke cost, it is sacrificed when it comes into play. Hideaway, which appears on a cycle of rare lands, lets the player "hide" (exiling facedown) a card "away" for later.

The new mechanics introduced in Morningtide are prowl, kinship, and reinforce. Cards may be cast for their prowl cost if the player has dealt combat damage with a Rogue, often providing some additional effect. Kinship rewards players for revealing creatures that share creature types from the top of their libraries. Reinforce allows you to discard the card with Reinforce, plus a small mana cost, to put +1/+1 counters on creatures already on the battlefield. Morningtide also has a cycle of tribal equipment.

== Storyline ==
The Lorwyn plane is based on Welsh mythology. The plane itself resembles an idyllic land apparently locked in a midsummer state. There is no night, only perpetual daytime. Sun-dappled forests, babbling brooks, and flower-covered mountains abound throughout Lorwyn.

The inhabitants of the plane appear to be inspired by mythological creature from western Europe. Notably, the human race, while popular in other Magic sets, is completely absent. Hobbit-like beings called Kithkin take their place. Other races include the mermaid-like Merfolk, Ent-like beings called Treefolk, Faeries, Boggarts, Elementals, and Changelings. While most of the groups live in relative harmony, the Elf race is cold and aloof, considering themselves superior and engaging in genocidal hunts against Boggarts and Elementals.

Every three hundred years a planar event occurs, known as the Great Aurora. This transforms Lorwyn into Shadowmoor, a sinister version of the former, where night is ever present. Each race dons a negative personality and become unaware of their past selves. The Elves, however, become modest and earnest-hearted. Strangely enough, the Faerie race and their queen, Oona, are unaffected during one Great Aurora manifestation. This is where the conflict of story begins.

The protagonists include Rhys, a male elf who had received tutelage from a Treefolk sage and who was later exiled from his tribe; Ashling, a female fiery elemental who assists the heroes; the Vendilion Clique, triplet faeries siblings; and the mysterious Maralen, a female elf, who, despite attempting to control the chaos of the Aurora, doesn't appear who she seems to be.
