= Onslaught (Magic: The Gathering) =

Block of expansion sets in Magic: The Gathering

- Released: October 7, 2002
- Size: 350 cards (110 commons, 110 uncommons, 110 rares, 20 basic lands)
- Keywords: Morph, Cycling
- Mechanics: Creature types
- Development code: Manny
- Expansion code: ONS

First set in the Onslaught block
Onslaught	Legions	Scourge
← Judgment	Legions →
← Odyssey Block	Mirrodin Block →

Legions
- Released: January 2003
- Size: 145 cards (55 commons, 45 uncommons, 45 rares)
- Keywords: Amplify, Provoke, Double Strike
- Mechanics: Creatures, Tribal Themes
- Development code: Moe
- Expansion code: LGN

Third set in the Onslaught block
Onslaught	Legions	Scourge
← Onslaught	Scourge →
← Odyssey Block	Mirrodin Block →

Scourge
- Released: May 17, 2003
- Size: 143 cards (55 commons, 44 uncommons, 44 rares)
- Keywords: Storm, Landcycling
- Mechanics: Converted Mana Cost
- Designers: Brian Tinsman (lead) and Worth Wollpert
- Developers: Randy Buehler Jr. (lead), Brandon Bozzi, Mike Elliott, Brian Schneider, and Henry Stern
- Development code: Jack
- Expansion code: SCG

Third set in the Onslaught block
Onslaught	Legions	Scourge
← Legions	8th Edition →
← Odyssey Block	Mirrodin Block →

Onslaught is a Magic: The Gathering expert-level block. It consists of the expansion sets Onslaught (October 2002), Legions (January 2003) and Scourge (May 2003). The block's main theme is creature types (for example, Clerics and Goblins), and much of the game play concerns interactions between these "tribes". The story continues the saga of the Mirari from the previous block of expansion sets. Onslaught was the last block printed before the "modern" card face style was introduced.

== Storyline ==
=== Onslaught ===
The story of Onslaught mainly concerns characters introduced in the Odyssey block. Kamahl the Barbarian has relocated to the Krosan Forest with the Mirari and becomes a druid of Krosa. The power of the Mirari begins to work on the forest, mutating its residents and growing some of them to gigantic proportions.

Meanwhile, Kamahl's sister Jeska is transformed by foul Cabal healing magic, into Phage, a pit fighter whose touch brings death. Phage then allies herself with the Cabal.

Ixidor, an illusionist, fights in the pits with his partner, a beautiful sorceress named Nivea, who ends up being killed off by Phage. Ixidor then wanders the desert in grief and discovers his new powers of reality sculpting. Ixidor uses his new power to create a palace in the desert, where he creates an angel based on Nivea named Akroma, who is sworn to his service. He resolves to avenge Nivea's slaying by attacking the Cabal and Phage with Akroma. The escalating struggle between Phage and Akroma leads Kamahl into an uneasy alliance with the Cabal against the destructive power of Ixidor and Akroma.

=== Legions ===
Kamahl and the Cabal, in their uneasy alliance, set out to defeat the threat of Akroma. Ixidor was killed, but Akroma continued her mission to destroy Phage. In a final battle, Phage and Akroma merge into one being, Karona, the false god. Meanwhile, the slivers, a species which arrived in Dominaria during the Phyrexian Invasion and went extinct at that time, have been revived as clones of the originals through the work of the Riptide Project. Although the Riptide Project was successful in bringing back the species, the hive-minded nature of the species was not understood by the researchers. The result was that the slivers escaped captivity, killed almost all Project staff, and then moved on to establish hives on mainland Otaria.

=== Scourge ===
The war between Phage and Akroma is over. There is no winner, but there is one clear loser: Otaria. The clash of such sheer power merged the two into a new creature, Karona the false god, an immensely powerful being forged from all five colors of Magic (Phage was originally Jeska, a red aligned barbarian corrupted by black mana; Akroma was a white angel created by Ixidor, a blue wizard; both of whom were simultaneously struck down by the green aligned Kamahl). Karona is seen as a god by all who look upon her, and these followers would march to their death just to walk in her footsteps. War begins to mount between rival factions of devotees, each wanting to claim Karona for themselves.

Meanwhile, the Mirari poisoning is further polluting the inhabitants of Otaria. The elves are becoming taller and stronger, more like the very trees they protect. The soldiers are merging with their weapons and armor into living juggernauts. Zombies are sprouting new, more powerful arms and extra heads. The same explosion that created Karona created a new master for the slivers, the Sliver Overlord.

Kamahl eventually frees Jeska. Karn returns and takes Jeska to his created plane, Argentum. He tells Jeska that she is a planeswalker, and asks her to travel the multiverse with him. She is hesitant to leave Argentum until Karn shows her its guardian, Memnarch, forged from the Mirari. This event sets up the next block, Mirrodin.

== Set history ==
=== Onslaught ===
Onslaught Block marked the end of many traditional elements of Magic: The Gathering. It was the last block to feature the old-style card faces or a storyline set in Dominaria until the release of the Time Spiral block. However, this was not apparent in October 2002 when the set was released.

Onslaught continued a recent trend of increasingly powerful creature based strategies. In particular, Onslaught saw the printing of many aggressively designed goblin cards. Along with additions from the Legions and Scourge expansions, the speed and consistency of optimized Goblin decks reached a level unmatched by most other creature decks of the time. The archetype has contributed to the ban of several cards in specific formats, including the previously underpowered Goblin Lackey and Goblin Recruiter. It has typically been a competitive deck choice in nearly every format where the Onslaught block is legal.

=== Legions ===
Legions is the only expansion in Magic to be composed entirely of creature cards. This was done to help emphasize the creature-based mechanics of the block such as Morph and Tribal. Due to the complete absence of non-creature cards and a limited number of tournament staples, Legions is considered to be one of the most controversial set releases by Wizards of the Coast among many players. The set does feature the return of a fan favorite creature type, Sliver.

=== Scourge ===
The release of Scourge made a significant impact on tournament play. The set added two cards Goblin Warchief and Siege-Gang Commander that strengthened goblin decks in multiple formats. Eternal Dragon gave white control decks both a robust card advantage engine that also served as a finisher. Vintage quickly adopted two cards with the storm mechanic, Mind's Desire and Tendrils of Agony due to their synergy with fast artifact mana and Yawgmoth's Will along with their relative immunity to the disruption available at the time such as Force of Will. The Scourge card Stifle allowed decks to counter certain abilities that were previously difficult to interact with while also providing an answer to the Scourge Storm cards.

== Mechanics ==
Onslaught introduced a number of major mechanics and featured the first return of a keyword from abeyance. Many of Onslaught's effects were tribal in nature, meaning they depended on a creature's types, i.e. its species, role, etc. These included type-specific creature removal, power boosts, and abilities which grew stronger based on the number of creatures of a certain type which a player controlled. The most radical new mechanic in Onslaught was Morph, which allowed players to play creatures as "face-down" creatures with no special abilities, except the ability to turn face-up for a cost. This added an element of guesswork to the game which was greater than any previously present. Onslaught reprised the Cycling mechanic (which lets a player pay a mana cost and discard the Cycling card from his or her hand in order to draw a card) from the Urza block. Onslaught expanded on the Cycling mechanic by using more varied mana costs than Urza's Block Cycling cards and by including abilities that are triggered by the use of Cycling cards.

Legions introduced three new keywords: amplify, provoke, and double strike. A creature with Amplify comes into play with a +1/+1 counter on it for each creature card that shared a type revealed from its controller's hand. When a creature with provoke attacks, it can untap an opponent's creature and force that creature to block it. Double strike was suggested on Magic's "You Make the Card" website, and allows a creature with it to deal both First Strike and regular combat damage. To compensate for the lack of instant and sorcery spells in Legions, a number of creatures had triggered abilities when cycled or turned face up after being morphed.

Scourge expanded on the Cycling mechanic with landcycling, which allows you to cycle a card to search your library for a land of the cycling type rather than drawing a card. For example, a card with Plainscycling 2 could be cycled for 2 mana to find a Plains. Perhaps its most well-known new mechanic was Storm, which allows you to copy a spell multiple times equal to the number of other spells that have been played on the turn. Storm is considered to be one of the more degenerate mechanics in the game as the effects generated by Storm spells can get out of hand, when a player finds a way to play a high number of spells in a single turn. A number of cards rewarded players for playing spells with a converted mana cost of six or greater. Scourge also had a theme around Dragons, including the five "dragon boons", one for each color, which would bounce back from the graveyard to enchant an expensive creature you control that comes into play.

== Notable cards ==
Notable cards from Onslaught include the Fetchlands cycle (Flooded Strand, Wooded Foothills, Bloodstained Mire, Windswept Heath, and Polluted Delta), which were later reprinted in Khans of Tarkir, Goblin Piledriver, Goblin Sharpshooter, Naturalize and Voidmage Prodigy

Perhaps the most notable card from Legions is the legendary Angel Akroma, Angel of Wrath.

Notable cards from Scourge include Forgotten Ancient (The result of the first "You Make The Card" feature of magicthegathering.com), Mind's Desire, Stifle and Tendrils of Agony
