= Kamigawa =

Block of expansion sets in Magic: The Gathering

Champions of Kamigawa
- torii gate
- Released: October 1, 2004
- Size: 306 (88 rares, 88 uncommons, 110 commons, 20 lands)
- Keywords: Bushido, Soulshift, Splice
- Mechanics: Spiritcraft, Flip cards, Legendary cards, Arcane
- Designers: Brian Tinsman (lead), Brandon Bozzi, Randy Buehler Jr., Elaine Chase, Brady Dommermuth, Mike Elliott, Bill Rose, and Mark Rosewater
- Developers: Brian Schneider (lead), Brandon Bozzi, Elaine Chase, Mike Elliott, Matt Place, and Henry Stern
- Development code: Earth
- Expansion code: CHK

First set in the Kamigawa block
Champions of Kamigawa	Betrayers of Kamigawa	Saviors of Kamigawa
← Fifth Dawn	Betrayers of Kamigawa →
← Mirrodin Block	Ravnica Block →

Betrayers of Kamigawa
- shuriken
- Released: February 4, 2005
- Size: 165 (55 rares, 55 uncommons, 55 commons)
- Keywords: Ninjutsu, Offerings
- Mechanics: Ninja, Ki counters
- Designers: Mike Elliott (lead) and Randy Buehler Jr.
- Developers: Henry Stern (lead), Randy Buehler Jr., Devin Low, Matt Place, and Paul Sottosanti
- Development code: Wind
- Expansion code: BOK

Second set in the Kamigawa block
Champions of Kamigawa	Betrayers of Kamigawa	Saviors of Kamigawa
← Champions of Kamigawa	Saviors of Kamigawa →
← Mirrodin Block	Ravnica Block →

Saviors of Kamigawa
- lantern
- Released: June 3, 2005
- Size: 165 (55 rares, 55 uncommons, 55 commons)
- Keywords: Epic
- Mechanics: Channel, Sweep, Hand size (wisdom)
- Designers: Brian Tinsman (lead), Brandon Bozzi, Devin Low, and Brian Schneider
- Developers: Randy Buehler Jr. (lead), Mons Johnson, Brian Schneider, Justin Webb, and Worth Wollpert
- Development code: Fire
- Expansion code: SOK

Third set in the Kamigawa block
Champions of Kamigawa	Betrayers of Kamigawa	Saviors of Kamigawa
← Betrayers of Kamigawa	9th Edition →
← Mirrodin Block	Ravnica Block →

Kamigawa: Neon Dynasty
- Released: February 18, 2022
- Size: 302 (18 mythic rares, 59 rares, 88 uncommons, 117 commons)
- Keywords: Channel, Ninjutsu, Reconfigure, Compleated, Transform
- Mechanics: Channel, Sweep, Hand size (wisdom)
- Designers: Mark Rosewater (lead); Ari Nieh; Emily Teng; Chris Mooney; Daniel Holt; Dave Humpherys; David McDarby; Ethan Fleischer; Mark Gottlieb
- Developers: Dave Humpherys (lead); Jadine Klomparens; Daniel Holt; Ari Nieh; Andrew Brown; Yoni Skolnik; Reggie Valk; Lukas Litzsinger; Ben Hayes; Koichiro Maki
- Development code: Hockey
- Expansion code: NEO

Kamigawa is an expert-level Magic: The Gathering block inspired by Japanese myths and revolving around the battle between spirits (kami) and living beings. It consists of the expansion sets Champions of Kamigawa (October 1, 2004), Betrayers of Kamigawa (February 4, 2005), and Saviors of Kamigawa (June 3, 2005). Magic would later return to the Kamigawa setting with the expansion set Kamigawa: Neon Dynasty (February 18, 2022).

== Set history ==
=== Champions ===
Champions of Kamigawa introduced changes to two common creature types. The Legend creature type was replaced with the Legendary supertype. The Wall creature type was freed from the associated rules that prevented Walls from attacking; Each Wall creature was changed to have the new Defender keyword which prevents them from attacking, allowing for a simpler use of the "wall" type creature across different creature types. For example, this allowed for the Lorwyn changelings, which have all creature types. Under the old rules, changelings would not be able to attack, through sheer result of being walls. Legend and Wall were the last creature types in Magic to have inherent rules associated with them. The set's expansion symbol is a torii, the entrance to the Shinto temple. This is especially important, as Kamigawa's original idea was summed up as "Shinto gone horribly wrong": Kami warring against their human worshippers.

== Mechanics ==
Champions of Kamigawa introduced several new mechanics to the game. Some instant or sorcery spells have the Arcane subtype, which represent spells or abilities used by the kami. It does nothing by itself, but other cards may interact with it. One type of spell that can interact with Arcane spells are spells with the keyword "Splice onto Arcane", which can be "attached" to another Arcane spell for additional mana investment. The "spliced" spell remains in the player's hand able to be reused another time. The block contains a large number of Spirit creatures (representative of the kami), some of which were printed with the Soulshift keyword, which allows them to return another Spirit creature from the graveyard to its owner's hand when they perish. Other Spirits have abilities which trigger when another Spirit or an Arcane spell is played. By contrast, many samurai were printed with the Bushido ("way of the warrior") mechanic, which increases a creature's power and toughness by the Bushido number when it combats another creature. (This is usually compared to flanking, which weakens (-1/-1) the blockers of the creature). Certain creatures, nicknamed "heroes", are "flipped" (the card is turned 180 degrees) when particular conditions are met, becoming an entirely different, more powerful, and Legendary creature. It has a disproportionately high number of Legendary cards, more than 80 in total.

Betrayers of Kamigawa introduces two new mechanics to the game. The Ninjutsu mechanic allows a player to put a Ninja creature card from their hand into play tapped and attacking by paying a cost and returning an attacking, unblocked creature he or she controls to its owner's hand. The Offering ability allows the player to partially pay for a spell by sacrificing a creature of a certain creature type and lets the spell be played as an instant. This ability is used on five Spirit creatures, the patron spirits of five non-human species in Kamigawa. Betrayers also features the first non-Wall creatures with defender.

Saviors of Kamigawa introduces several new mechanics to the game. Epic spells are powerful cards that prevent their controller from playing spells for the rest of the game, except for a copy of the spell again for free during each of their upkeeps. Channel, an ability similar to cycling that represents the fading barrier between the spirit world and reality, allows some spirits to have the ability to concentrate their physical form into a one-shot instant-effect. Sweep spells allow players to determine how powerful they want the spell to be, in exchange for returning lands of a required type to their owner's hand. Saviors expanded on the Flip theme, but with creatures that flip into legendary enchantments, symbolizing that creature's Essence, once their conditions are met. Saviors of Kamigawa also has a theme of "Wisdom" that rewards players for having seven cards (or some other high number of cards) in their hands. Saviors also features the first intentionally uncastable spell, Evermind, which has no mana cost. Its effect can only be achieved through the use of the Splice mechanic introduced in Champions of Kcamigawa. However, new rules from Time Spiral now allow cards without mana costs to be cast, as long as the player can bypass paying the non-existent mana cost.

== Storyline ==
The depiction of the world of Kamigawa is heavily inspired by East Asian culture, especially that of sengoku-era Japan. The backdrop of the story involves the physical realm of mortals, which is called the utsushiyo, and the spiritual realm of the kami, which is called the kakuriyo. Each realm living in harmony, the denizens of the physical realm worship the kami, most of whom are personifications of everyday objects or aspects of nature.

The conflict of the story begins when suddenly the kami attack the physical realm, killing many denizens in their wake. It is here that the Kami War begins, lasting for twenty years. The feudal lord, or daimyō, of Kamigawa, Takeshi Konda, employs samurai and scholars to resolve the situation, many of which are represented on the playing cards. Apart from the human race, various other races are also depicted, most notably the Moonfolk race, the Soratami race, and the distinctive humanoid rat race.

The heroes of the story are Michiko Konda, the pure-hearted daughter of the daimyō, and Toshiro Umezawa, a ronin samurai with roguish qualities. Although many other characters are involved, it is these two that play out as the protagonists of the story, both of whom determined to end the Kami War.

The rising action of the story involves Umezawa's struggle with a fellow gang member, Hidetsugu, an ogre with an eschatomanic philosophy regarding oni; and the protagonists' interactions with the five Myojin, some of the most powerful kami with elemental powers pertaining to life, death, omniscience, destruction, and ecology.

The story concludes with the revelation of Takeshi Konda being the main antagonist. With the help of his Moonfolk allies, he had stolen the offspring, or rather ethereal component, of O-Kagachi, the supreme deity of Kamigawa who controls the barrier between the spirit realm and the physical realm. Enraged, the supreme god had removed the barrier and commanded an all-out attack to retrieve its child. The daimyō had done so to achieve immortality, precisely on the night his daughter Michiko had been born. Umezawa is able to steal the spirit child back and, once a ritual of release is performed, he and Michiko are able to reconcile with the kami. The spirit child takes on the form of a dragon-like being, calling itself Kyodai, and merges with Michiko. O-Kagachi and Konda are defeated, and the Sisters of Flesh and Spirit (namely Michiko and Kyodai combined) become the new gatekeeper between the physical realm and spirit realm. Umezawa has one last confrontation with a Soratami prophet, who kills him. The female Myojin of death resurrects him, after he pledges his allegiance to her, and she transports him to the plane of Dominaria.

== Notable cards ==
Notable cards in Champions include Gifts Ungiven and Sensei's Divining Top. Basic lands in this set formed a panoramic collage.

One notable card from Betrayers is Umezawa's Jitte.

Notable cards in Saviors include Erayo, Soratami Ascendant, Azusa, Lost but Seeking, and Pithing Needle.
