= Dominaria United =

- Released: September 9th, 2022
- Size: 434 cards
- Keywords: Read Ahead, Enlist, Kicker, Domain
- Mechanics: Stun counters, powerstone tokens
- Development code: Judo
- Expansion code: DMU
← Streets of New Capenna	The Brothers' War →

Dominaria United is an expansion of the Magic: The Gathering card game. It was released on September 9, 2022. The set returns to plane of Dominaria, and features both old and new characters as they unite against a new Phyrexian invasion lead by Sheoldred.

The set was notable for including cards from the 1994 Legends expansion in collector boosters at a 3% rate per pack. Wizards of the Coast found a warehouse filled with cases of the expansion sitting in a warehouse, and decided to add them in honor of Magic's 30th Anniversary Celebration. Not every card was included due to failing to open them in the cases, but among the ones that were included famous cards like The Tabernacle at Pendrell Vale, Chains of Mephistopheles, and Moat.

== Keywords ==
Two new keywords appear in this set:

- Read Ahead: appears on Sagas. It allows a player to skip to the chapter of their choice.
- Enlist: creatures with this keyword can tap another untapped creature (provided they have haste or do not have summoning sickness) when attacking to boost their power.

== Mechanics ==
Two new mechanics make an appearance:

- Stun counters: a new type of counter. If a card with one or more stun counters on it would untap (thus becoming available for use), instead a counter is removed.
- Powerstone tokens: a new type of artifact token. It can produce colorless mana, which can be spent on anything except for a nonartifact spell.

== Returning abilities ==
Additionally, a number of prior abilities make a return in the set:

- Kicker (pay an additional cost when casting a spell for an extra benefit)
- Domain (increases benefits the more total basic land types you have)
