= Kamigawa: Neon Dynasty =

Magic: The Gathering Set

- Released: February 18, 2022
- Keywords: Ninjutsu, Channel, Compleated
- Mechanics: Reconfigure, Modified
- Expansion code: NEO
← Innistrad: Crimson Vow	Streets of New Capenna →

Kamigawa: Neon Dynasty is a Magic: The Gathering expansion set released by Wizards of the Coast on February 18, 2022. The set takes place on the Plane of Kamigawa, 1,200 years after the original Kamigawa set. It introduces several new mechanics such as "compleated", modified, and reconfigure, as well as revisiting ninjutsu, channel, enchantment creatures, and sagas.

Rather than revisiting the original set's theme of "Shinto gone wrong", Kamigawa: Neon Dynasty re-imagines the Plane as a cyberpunk city.

== Setting and story ==
=== Differences from the original Kamigawa Block ===
Intending to be reminiscent of Sengoku Era Japan, Kamigawa contains two "worlds" based on the Shinto concepts of Utsushiro (the material world) and Kakuriyo (the spirit world), alongside Samurai and Ninja. Within Kakuriyo there are spirits taken from the Shinto religion called Kami; whose emergence into the material world was a hook for the original Kamigawa block.

The Kami retain their presence in Neon Dynasty, alongside futuristic redesigns of Samurai and Ninja. As part of the story design process, Wizards of the Coast spoke with cultural consultants to better represent the culture and history of Japan that was being drawn from in Kamigawa: Neon Dynasty.

=== Story ===
1,200 years after the original Kamigawa block, Neon Dynasty follows a newly introduced Planeswalker named Kaito Shizuki who was childhood friends with The Emperor of Kamigawa before her disappearance ten years before the set's events. Kaito sees a man with a metal arm just after The Emperor's disappearance and vows to track him down and return The Emperor to Kamigawa.

In present-day Kamigawa, Kaito's sister, Eiko, informs him that his best friend Tameshi is suspected of performing illegal experiments at a Futurist lab with a man with a metal arm. Kaito sneaks into the lab and discovers that Tameshi had been conducting experiments on Kami, and the presence of Jin-Gitaxias, a Phyrexian Praetor. Henchmen begin to burn down the lab to hide evidence of the experimentation, and as Kaito rushes to recover evidence of the crimes, finds his friend Tameshi, who reveals the man with the metal arm to be Tezzeret, a Planeswalker and a villan that has featured in previous Magic the Gathering sets.

In trying to find information about Tezzeret, Kaito learns of a Nezumi village that was destroyed by a man matching Tezzeret's description. Tracking down the sole survivor of the village's destruction, Kaito encounters Tamiyo, another Planeswalker who reveals that The Emperor is actual a Planeswalker who is known outside of Kamigawa as The Wanderer, and whose spark was activated when Tezzeret attempted to prototype "The Reality Chip" to take control of The Emperor's guardian kami. The Emperor's spark is unstable however, making it impossible for her to return to Kamigawa. Kaito returns to Tameshi's lab and finds the Reality Chip. Attempting to leave after taking it, he is confronted by Jin-Gitaxias. Escaping, Kaito is pursued by a robotic dragon and is saved by The Emperor as she has returned to Kamigawa.

Tamiyo helps them escape to Eiganjo Castle, where the reality chip is inserted into The Emperor's hand to tether her unstable spark to Kamigawa. The Emperor then receives a vision of the anti-imperialist Asari Uprising preparing to attack the castle after Jin-Gitaxias' has informed them of The Emperor's return.

Kaito leaves The Emperor to defend the castle, while he and Tamiyo return to Tameshi's lab, planning to destroy it before Jin-Gitaxias can continue his research. Tezzeret and Jin-Gitaxias were prepared for the two Planeswalkers and is able to surprise them and defeat them. Sensing the danger Kaito and Tamiyo are in, the Emperor planeswalks to them, subdues Jin-Gitaxias and helps the two capture Tezzeret.

The Three return to Eiganjo castle to fight off the Asari Uprising. Back at the castle, Tezzeret is able to escape and after a brief fight, teleports away with Tamiyo held captive. Kaito helps the Emperor defeat the leader of the Asari Uprising before her unstable Planeswalker spark teleports her away from Kamigawa again. Kaito vows to search for The Emperor and Tamiyo, and also leaves Kamigawa.

On New Phyrexia, Tezzeret witnesses Jin-Gitaxias complete Tamiyo, creating the first successful Phyrexian Planeswalker.

== Mechanics ==
Unlike the original Kamigawa set, samurai creatures do not feature the bushido ability. Designer Mark Rosewater has said this was because the mechanic did not play well and discouraged combat.

The set also introduced a new game term: "modified". It now refers to any creature that is enchanted, equipped, or has a +1/+1 counter, and there are cards in the set to support modified creatures.

The following mechanics are new to the set:

- Reconfigure: artifact creatures that have this mechanic can also function as Equipment. If equipped, they are no longer considered creatures.

The following mechanics have appeared in previous sets:

- Sagas: a type of enchantment that lasts for a few turns and activates when it enters or you draw for your turn. All the Sagas in this set have their third ability transform them into a card on their other side.
- Double-faced cards: cards that utilize the back as another card.
- Vehicles and crew: artifacts that can be turned creatures, by other creatures tapping to "crew" them.

Additionally, a mechanic returned that is also new in a way: hybrid Phyrexian mana. The mechanic of Phyrexian mana first appeared in the New Phyrexia set, but this set marks the first appearance of hybrid phyrexian mana. It works the same as both hybrid mana and Phyrexian mana.

== Keywords and ability words ==
The following keywords and ability words appear in the set:

- Compleated: appears on planeswalkers converted to a Phyrexian. They include hybrid phyrexian mana symbols in their cost, and if life is paid instead of mana, they enter with 2 less loyalty for time life was paid this way
- Channel: cards with Channel can be discarded and a mana cost paid to get an alternate effect.
- Ninjutsu: creatures with ninjutsu can replace unblocked creatures as attackers

== Artwork ==
Kamigawa: Neon Dynasty used three unique card border variations for a limited set of cards titled "Samurai Frame", "Ninja Frame", and "Soft-Glow Frame". 10 full art lands were also included in the set, featuring art intended to be evocative of traditional Japanese woodblock prints or ukiyo-e. Alongside these there were 7 borderless cards featuring alternative artwork.

A new "neon ink" treatment was used to create four versions of the card Hidetsugu, Devouring Chaos, three of which were included in less than 1% of the sets printed Collector's Booster packs and one given out only as a promo card at Wizards Play Network game stores. This printing treatment has not been used since.

Two cards, Jin-Gitaxias, Progress Tyrant and Tamiyo, Compleated Sage, had versions printed in Magic's constructed language, Phyrexian, and with unique card frames.

== Reception ==
Critics noted the abundance of cards suited for the Commander format over others, and the amount of alternative art and treatments, but otherwise saw the set favorably. The set was also praised for the use of the "compleated" mechanic as an engaging glimpse of the upcoming sets.
