= Mirrodin =

Magic: The Gathering expert-level block of expansion sets

- Sword of Kaldra
- Released: October 2, 2003
- Size: 306 cards (110 commons, 88 uncommons, 88 rares, 20 basic lands)
- Keywords: Affinity, Imprint, Entwine
- Mechanics: Artifacts, Equipment
- Designers: Mark Rosewater (lead), Mike Elliott, Brian Tinsman, Tyler Bielman, Bill Rose
- Developers: Randy Buehler (lead), Brian Schneider, Henry Stern, Elaine Chase, Brandon Bozzi, and Brian Tinsman
- Development code: Bacon
- Expansion code: MRD

First set in the Mirrodin block
Mirrodin	Darksteel	Fifth Dawn
← 8th Edition	Darksteel →
← Onslaught Block	Kamigawa Block →

Darksteel
- Shield of Kaldra
- Released: February 6, 2004
- Size: 165 cards (55 commons, 55 uncommons, 55 rares)
- Keywords: Modular
- Mechanics: Indestructible
- Designers: Bill Rose (lead), Tyler Bielman, Brian Schneider, Mark Rosewater
- Developers: Henry Stern (lead), Tyler Bielman, Brandon Bozzi, Charlie Catmandu, and Brian Schneider
- Development code: Lettuce
- Expansion code: DST

Second set in the Mirrodin block
Mirrodin	Darksteel	Fifth Dawn
← Mirrodin	Fifth Dawn →
← Onslaught Block	Kamigawa Block →

Fifth Dawn
- Helm of Kaldra
- Released: June 4, 2004
- Size: 165 cards (55 commons, 55 uncommons, 55 rares)
- Keywords: Sunburst, Scry
- Mechanics: 5 Colors, Cogs
- Designers: Mark Rosewater (lead), Randy Buehler Jr., Aaron Forsythe, and Gregory Marques
- Developers: Brian Schneider (lead), Brandon Bozzi, Randy Buehler Jr., Michael Donais, Mike Elliott, Devin Low, Henry Stern, and Worth Wollpert
- Development code: Tomato
- Expansion code: 5DN

Third set in the Mirrodin block
Mirrodin	Darksteel	Fifth Dawn
← Darksteel	Champions of Kamigawa →
← Onslaught Block	Kamigawa Block →

Mirrodin is the name of the Magic: The Gathering expert-level block containing the Mirrodin (October 2, 2003, 306 cards), Darksteel (February 6, 2004, 165 cards) and Fifth Dawn (June 4, 2004, 165 cards) expansion sets. The Mirrodin expansion set, as well as the rest of the block, is centered on artifacts and was only the second set to do so (from a card frequency point of view) since Antiquities. The percentage of artifact cards is much higher than in any preceding set. Each of the expansion symbols in the Mirrodin block depicts a legendary artifact: Sword of Kaldra (Mirrodin), Shield of Kaldra (Darksteel) and Helm of Kaldra (Fifth Dawn).

== Storyline: The world of Mirrodin ==
The setting for Mirrodin is a plane by the same name. An artificial world created by the planeswalker Karn, originally named Argentum, and named after the Mirari by Memnarch, Mirrodin's environments and inhabitants mix organic and metallic. Mirrodin is orbited by four satellites, which are called suns and moons interchangeably, that correspond to red, black, white and blue magic. Green was notably absent until Glissa Sunseeker became a conduit for its birth.

The set focuses on five main regions on Mirrodin, each corresponding to a part of the Magic color pie:

- The Oxidda Chain, a range of mountains populated by goblins and the human Vulshok tribe.
- The Tangle, a dense jungle populated by elves, the human Sylvok tribe and beasts.
- The Mephidross, a mucky swamp, and a home of Nim (zombies) and the human Moriok tribe.
- Quicksilver Sea, a sea of mercury populated by Vedalken and the human Neurok tribe.
- Razor Grass Fields, the plains of Mirrodin, overgrown with sharp metallic grass and home to the Leonin, the human Auriok tribe and Loxodon.

The main character of the story is the elf Glissa Sunseeker, who visits all these places, guided by revenge against the machines that killed her family. The story is captured in the novel The Moons of Mirrodin by Will McDermott. Magic returned to the setting of Mirrodin with the Scars of Mirrodin block.

=== Darksteel ===
The Darksteel Eye is the second novel in the Mirrodin Cycle by Jess Lebow. It continues the journey of Glissa, after the infiltration of the Synod and the recollection of all the golem Bosh's memories. They now must travel back across Mirrodin to seek the power that resides in the center of Mirrodin.

=== Fifth Dawn ===
The final book in this expansion series is named The Fifth Dawn. In the story, Glissa, Bosh, and Slobad journey deep within Mirrodin's core to confront the insidious Memnarch. With them is the Kaldra avatar—an immensely powerful being of energy summoned when Kaldra's sword, shield, and helm were brought together. But what was supposed to be the world's salvation turns out to be a vile trick. With a single spell, Memnarch seizes the avatar and turns it on Glissa and her companions. Kaldra's avatar relentlessly pursues Glissa into the Tangle, destroying everything in its way. Finally, at the Radix, Glissa's destiny becomes clear. As rage and despair overcome her, Glissa's body calls forth a great column of green mana from Mirrodin's core, annihilating the avatar in the process. Now that mana hangs overhead in a glowing sphere—the green sun at last, Mirrodin's fifth dawn.

== Set history ==
=== Mirrodin ===
Mirrodin is notable for being the first expansion set to feature the new card front design (which debuted in 8th Edition). The high number of artifacts in Mirrodin highlighted the inherent flaw of the new border design — artifact cards, which were now bordered in a very light grey instead of brown, were very hard to distinguish from white cards. The problem prompted Wizards of the Coast to change the bordering background of artifact cards to a much darker grey in Fifth Dawn. Also due to complications when switching to the new card frame, mana symbols in the text box of Mirrodin cards are greyed out instead of being in color. Beginning with Mirrodin Wizards reduced the size of their large expansion sets from 350 to 306 cards. This was due to regular complaints, that Wizards was producing too many cards and players could not keep up. Beginning with Darksteel Wizards also increased the size of small expansion sets from 143 to 165 cards. Thus the number of cards released each year would stay the same, but then Magic developer Randy Buehler explained that Wizards believed this change would make it easier for collectors and players to keep up with the number of new cards as these would be released more homogeneously over the course of the year.

=== Darksteel ===
Darksteel was the first "small" expansion to have 165 cards, whereas previous small expansions had 143, (with the exception of Legions which had 145 as a balance among the five colors.)

=== Fifth Dawn ===
The name Fifth Dawn is derived from the plane's five suns. Each sun is associated with a color of mana and the green sun, which has long been absent, returns to the sky as part of this set's storyline. Fifth Dawn adds a new twist to artifact theme of Mirrodin and Darksteel: it encourages using colored mana for playing artifact spells, via the Sunburst mechanic (see below). Fifth Dawn introduced an enhanced design for artifact cards, which uses a darker inner border to help players distinguish artifacts from white cards. Fifth Dawn theme decks contained a few reprints from Mirrodin and Darksteel with the improved card face.

== Mechanics ==
Mirrodin introduced a number of new mechanics, including Equipment, Affinity, Imprint and Entwine. The artifact subtype Equipment, which has become a staple of Magic, represented weapons, clothing and armor that could be wielded or worn by creatures. Equipment functions like the older "Enchant Creature" cards (now called Auras) in that they provide some effect while attached to the creature. Unlike Auras, however, Equipment can only be attached to creatures you control in most cases, and remain in play even if the creature they were attached to leaves play. Affinity reduces the total cost of a spell by the number of permanents in play of a certain type, which in the case of Mirrodin was always artifacts or basic land types. Entwine was an optional cost on modal instants and sorceries, which allows a player to choose all effects (rather than only one) if the Entwine cost was paid. The Imprint keyword allowed an artifact to gain additional effects if another card is exiled and imprinted on that artifact. Mirrodin also had an infamous cycle of artifact lands.

Darksteel continued the Equipment, Affinity, Imprint and Entwine mechanics, and introduced the indestructible and modular keywords. Something that is or has indestructible can't be destroyed by damage or "destroy effects". In Darksteel, indestructible cards (all of which were artifacts) are made of the titular metal, though other things have been deemed indestructible when it became a common mechanic in later sets (similar to Double Strike, introduced in the Onslaught). Modular was a keyworded ability of artifact creatures, these creatures would come into play with a set number of counters and, upon the destruction of that creature, could transfer them to another artifact creature. Modular was part of a larger theme of charge counters on artifacts throughout the set.

Fifth Dawn introduced the Sunburst and Scry mechanics. Artifacts with Sunburst get +1/+1 counters (if the card is a creature) or charge counters (if noncreature) for each color of mana used to pay the artifact's mana cost. "Scry X" means "Look at the top X cards of your library. Put any number of them on the bottom of your library and the rest on top in any order." X was always 2 in Fifth Dawn, but other numbers were introduced when Scry was reprised for subsequent sets.

== Notable cards ==
One notable cycle in Mirrodin was the cycle of artifact lands (Ancient Den, Seat of the Synod, Vault of Whispers, Great Furnace and Tree of Tales). These enhanced the power of cards with the "Affinity" mechanic by increasing the number of artifacts in play while still being considered lands. Due to abuse, they are banned or restricted in some formats. Other notable cards include Chalice of the Void and Chrome Mox.

Notable cards in Darksteel include Æther Vial, Arcbound Ravager, Darksteel Citadel, Darksteel Reactor, Death Cloud, Skullclamp, Sword of Fire and Ice, Sword of Light and Shadow and Trinisphere.

Notable cards in Fifth Dawn include Crucible of Worlds, Engineered Explosives, Serum Visions and Vedalken Shackles.
