= Time Spiral =

Magic: The Gathering expansion block

- An hourglass
- Released: October 6, 2006
- Size: 301 cards (121 commons, 80 uncommons, 80 rares, 20 basic lands)+ 121 timeshifted
- Keywords: Buyback, Echo, Flanking, Flash, Flashback, Kicker, Madness, Morph, Shadow, Split Second, Storm, Suspend, Threshold
- Mechanics: Timeshifted cards, Slivers, Thallids, Kavu, Nightmares, Spellshapers, Rebels
- Designers: Brian Tinsman (lead), Aaron Forsythe, Devin Low, Mark Rosewater
- Developers: Brian Schneider (lead), Michael Donais, Aaron Forsythe, Devin Low, Matt Place
- Development code: Snap
- Expansion code: TSP

First set in the Time Spiral block
Time Spiral	Planar Chaos	Future Sight
← Coldsnap	Planar Chaos →
← Ravnica Block	Lorwyn Block →

Planar Chaos
- tilted hourglass, merging planes, stylized letters "PC", or Möbius strip
- Released: February 2, 2007
- Size: 165 cards (60 common, 55 uncommon, 50 rare)
- Keywords: Echo, Flanking, Flash, Kicker, Madness, Morph, Shadow, Split Second, Suspend, Vanishing
- Mechanics: Spellshapers, Rebels, Split Cards
- Designers: Bill Rose (lead), Matt Place, Mark Rosewater, Paul Sottosanti
- Developers: Devin Low, Zvi Mowshowitz, Brian Schneider, Henry Stern, Mike Turian
- Development code: Crackle
- Expansion code: PLC

Second set in the Time Spiral block
Time Spiral	Planar Chaos	Future Sight
← Time Spiral	Future Sight →
← Ravnica Block	Lorwyn Block →

Future Sight
- An eye gazing through a rift portal
- Released: May 4, 2007
- Size: 180 (60 rares, 60 uncommons, 60 commons)
- Keywords: Poisonous, Delve, Suspend, Vanishing, Transfigure, Gravestorm
- Mechanics: Scry
- Designers: Mark Rosewater (lead), Matt Cavotta, Devin Low, Mark Gottlieb, Ryan Miller, Zvi Mowshowitz
- Developers: Mike Turian (lead), Matt Cavotta, Matt Place, Brian Schneider
- Development code: Pop
- Expansion code: FUT

Third set in the Time Spiral block
Time Spiral	Planar Chaos	Future Sight
← Planar Chaos	10th Edition →
← Ravnica Block	Lorwyn Block →

Time Spiral is a Magic: The Gathering expert-level block consisting of the expansion sets Time Spiral (October 6, 2006), Planar Chaos (February 2, 2007), and Future Sight (May 4, 2007). It is set on the plane of Dominaria, the first time that that plane had been visited since 8th Edition.

The theme of the block was time. Time Spiral focused on the past, and is laden with references to previous Magic: the Gathering sets. The references are reflected in the card design, which incorporates special rules from older sets, and in special "Time shifted" cards, which are cards reprinted from older sets using the older card design (abandoned three years previous with the 2003 release of Core Set 8th Edition.) Planar Chaos focused on the present, referencing previous Magic: The Gathering cards, but changing them in some way, such as changing their color or shifting their permanent type. Future Sight focused on the future, both in that it includes cards from settings not yet explored in previous sets as well as including game mechanics that did not exist until later sets.

Time Spiral is typical among the first sets of a Magic: the Gathering block in that the cards are sold in four different forms. Four different theme decks, 60 card decks with themed, fixed composition were released, each featuring a different aspect of the set. The cards were sold in randomized packs, both as the typical 15-card booster packs and in larger 75-card tournament packs.

== Conception and design ==
=== Time Spiral ===
In his preview articles, Mark Rosewater described Time Spiral as an expansion focused on the past, with its successors, Planar Chaos and Future Sight, to be centered around the present and future respectively. This design was achieved through keywords and mechanics that interact with time, as well as cards based on those in previous sets, to promote a sense of nostalgia. Time Spiral was codenamed "Snap" during development.

The size of the set had been in dispute prior to release, as Wizards issued two different sizes for the set, 301 and 422. Retailers were initially told that the set would include 422 cards; Wizards of the Coast sent a retraction email explaining that the set would in fact be 301 cards in size. The set size was then confirmed to be 301 cards, with 121 commons, 80 uncommons, 80 rares, and 20 basic lands. The confusion came about because Time Spiral was released with a 'sub-set', 121 timeshifted cards in addition to the 301-card basic set. After the set officially went public, Rosewater said that Wizards of the Coast had released the apparently conflicting figures by accident, but ended up just as happy to have done so after seeing the speculation they fueled.

Time Spiral booster packs marked Wizards of the Coast’s then-new and current premium card distribution method, where premium cards replace commons, as opposed to replacing a card of the premium's standard rarity.

==== Nostalgia ====
Creature card types from previous block sets, such as Kavu, Merfolk, Thallids, and Slivers, returned, in addition to new incarnations of old cards. Eight keyword abilities from past sets also returned in Time Spiral, with some keywords not having appeared since 1997: Buyback, Echo, Flanking, Flashback, Madness, Morph, Shadow, and Storm. Old non-keyword mechanics like slivers, rebels, spellshapers, and nightmares also appear on new cards. There are also several cards that directly allude to older, well-known cards, such as the Magus cycle: creatures that are similar to the cards Cursed Scroll, Nevinyrral's Disk, Memory Jar, Mirror Universe, and Candelabra of Tawnos.

=== Planar Chaos ===
Designed by Bill Rose (lead designer), Matt Place, Mark Rosewater, and Paul Sottosanti, and developed by Devin Low (lead developer), Zvi Mowshowitz, Brian Schneider, Henry Stern, and Mike Turian, Planar Chaos was tasked with representing the present in a set focused on the cycle of time. The design team considered a number of ways to represent an alternate present, including the introduction of purple as a new color. Eventually, the team chose to represent alternate realities where elements of the color pie were shifted, placing spell types and abilities into unusual colors. These alternate realities were epitomized by the set's 45 "color shifted" cards. Unlike their predecessors in Time Spiral, these cards were direct reprints of previous cards, save for shifts in color, land or color references in card text, card name, and creature type. Some of these are instantly recognizable by veteran players as reprints of extremely famous and iconic cards, like Damnation being a black reprint of the white card Wrath of God, or Hedge Troll being a colorshifted version of Sedge Troll. Others are reprints of much more obscure cards, and might not have been recognized as colorshifted without the altered border, such as Keen Sense being a reprint of Curiosity and Sunlance being a color-shifted Strafe. Color-shifted cards in Planar Chaos are distinguished by an altered version of the modern card frame; the card name and type are printed in white text instead of black, and their respective text bubbles feature much more saturated background colors. Color-shifted cards feature standard set symbols, unlike the timeshifted cards from Time Spiral. This was far from the first time when cards received functional reprints in new colors; Holy Day from Legends, for example, was a color-shifted reprint of Fog. However, this was the first time when color-shifted reprints of previous cards were explicitly indicated as such.

Timeshifted cards in Planar Chaos are also distributed differently. In each pack, three common cards are of the Timeshifted variety and an uncommon is replaced with either a timeshifted rare or uncommon. Foil cards, instead of replacing a card of the same rarity, replace a common card. As such, it is possible to receive a booster with up to three rare cards: one normal, one foil, and one timeshifted. The uncommon timeshifted cards show up in a 3:1 ratio to the rare timeshifted cards, so the average out of 4 boosters is 3 uncommon and 1 rare timeshifted card.

In addition to color-shifted cards that perfectly replicated the functions of previous cards, with only colors, land types, and creature types changed, Planar Chaos also features color-shifted, alternate-timeline versions of famous cards with sometimes radically altered or remixed functionality but the standard border. From the Rath and Masquerade cycles, Mirri, Cat Warrior, Crovax the Cursed, and Ascendant Evincar became Mirri the Cursed and Crovax, Ascendant Hero. From the Odyssey and Onslaught cycles, Braids, Cabal Minion became Braids, Conjurer Adept and Akroma, Angel of Wrath became Akroma, Angel of Fury. Five new dragon legends were created in enemy-color combinations, based loosely on the five dragon legends in friendly-color combinations from Invasion.

=== Future Sight ===
Future Sight contains 180 cards. The expansion symbol is an eye looking through a rift portal. The designers of the set are Mark Rosewater (lead), Matt Cavotta, Devin Low, Mark Gottlieb, Ryan Miller, and Zvi Mowshowitz. The developers of the set are Mike Turian (lead), Matt Cavotta, Matt Place, and Brian Schneider. Another Magus cycle—creature cards that refer to cards from the past—made its appearance as well; the cycle in Future Sight echoes enchantments from past sets. For example, the card Magus of the Moon has the same ability as the enchantment Blood Moon.

Although in practice a number of Future Sight cards were inspired by cards from the Un-Set Unhinged, the finished cards were presented as previews from the future. For example, Future Sight also introduced a new card supertype, Tribal. Tribal cards have a set of subtypes that are shared with creature types; Tribal cards give creature types to noncreature cards. The Tribal type had been planned for the Lorwyn set, and was "preprinted" on the card Bound in Silence, a "Tribal Enchantment - Rebel Aura". Similarly, the card Goldmeadow Lookout created a copy of a card from Lorwyn, Goldmeadow Harrier, and the card Tarmogoyf mentioned the not-yet-printed card type "Planeswalker."

Future Sight also was originally to include the Planeswalker cards, but the design was not ready on time, so they were included in the Lorwyn expansion instead.

=== Timeshifted cards ===
To further represent the temporal chaos afflicting Dominaria, Time Spiral was released with an additional sub-set of 121 "Timeshifted" cards, reprints of select cards from every set prior to Mirrodin. The "Timeshifted" cards were updated to meet the current rules and keywording. To differentiate them from normal cards, "Timeshifted" cards are printed in the pre-8th Edition card frame, with a purple Time Spiral expansion symbol. The "Timeshifted" cards are distributed one per booster pack and three per tournament pack (taking the place of common cards), and also appear in the preconstructed decks. According to DCI-distributed tournament primers, "Timeshifted" cards are tournament legal where Time Spiral or the set of original printing are.

"Timeshifted" cards also appear in Planar Chaos, but are not direct reprints of older cards; instead, they are "color-shifted" versions of well-known cards (same mechanic, different color) and are printed in alternate frames, with normal rarity symbols (as opposed to purple ones from Time Spiral "Timeshifted"), and as a regular part of the set.

Future Sight has "Timeshifted" cards as well, as first confirmed by Mark Rosewater. In the same way as Planar Chaos, these "Timeshifted" cards are not direct reprints of older Magic cards, but rather cards that may appear in future sets. These cards have normal rarity symbols as opposed to purple, and are considered a part of the expansion, not a separate sub-set. Also, the "Timeshifted" cards in Future Sight have been given a new frame. Another difference is that Future Sight has many mechanics spread among many cards, instead of several focused mechanics. With Future Sight, the frame design of the "Timeshifted" cards is entirely new. On "Timeshifted" cards in Future Sight, the card's mana cost appears in bubbles curving down the left side of the card right next to the picture, appearing in the traditional order of colorless mana, white, blue, black, red, and green from top to bottom. In the top left corner of each card is a symbol that tells the card type; for example, a symbol of claw marks represent a creature card. This design was a Future Sight "Timeshifted" feature only, and was used to give the cards a futuristic feel.

== Storyline ==
=== Time Spiral ===
As with all Magic: the Gathering sets in this period, Time Spiral is accompanied by a tie-in novel of the same name. The novel Time Spiral, written by Scott McGough, expands the setting and events depicted on the cards of Time Spiral into a full story. During the Phyrexian invasion 300 years ago, Teferi phased out the (sub)continents of Shiv and Zhalfir before phasing out himself. Teferi has now returned to Dominaria to prepare for the return of Shiv and Zhalfir. However, Dominaria is not as he knows it: the stress of constant warfare and apocalypse (the Brothers' War, the Phyrexian invasion, and Karona's War), combined with mana-draining rifts created by the overlaying of Rath and Skyshroud (among other events across the multiverse, such as the near-destruction of Ulgrotha), have set off a chain reaction that has created ripples in the temporal fabric of the planes. The unphasing of Shiv threatens to tear these rifts, destroying the plane of Dominaria, and in turn the entire multiverse.

After the defeat of Karona at the end of Judgement, the rifts in the planar fabric began to act as mana sinks, draining the Dominarian lands of mana. Life on the plane became harsh, and the temporal rifts caused people and objects from Dominaria's past to be "dropped" into the present, leaving people stranded in unrecognizable lands thousands of years from their time.

=== Planar Chaos ===
The temporal stresses being applied to Dominaria have expanded, causing multiple parallel universes (versions of Dominaria where history played out differently) to merge into the already colliding past-present-future of current events.

=== Future Sight ===
Teferi, Jhoira, and Venser continue their battle to heal the time rifts that plague Dominaria. The rift in Tolaria is so severe that it cannot be healed in the present day. In order to remedy it, Karn travels back in time. He manages to close the time rift, but in the process is lost.

The Planeswalker Jeska returns to Dominaria. Finding her friend Karn gone, she becomes angry and is manipulated by the Planeswalker Leshrac into using Radha as a kind of mana focuser to close the time rifts without using up her Planeswalker spark. She sets out to continue her mentor's work, and seals both the Zhalfirin and Yavimayan rifts, respectively losing Zhalfir proper and Multani in the process. It is revealed later on that Leshrac was using Jeska to gain the dark power of one of her former selves, Phage. Having gained that power, Leshrac then challenges the powerful Planeswalker Nicol Bolas to a duel, only to be defeated by him. Bolas then uses what remains of Leshrac to seal the Madaran rift.

Once again in charge of her own actions, Jeska enters the Otarian rift to try to seal it with the help of both Venser and Radha. During their efforts, they merge to form an alternate version of Karona. At the final stage, Jeska teleports both Venser and Radha to a safe location, sacrificing herself to seal the final rift at the end of the book.

== Mechanics ==
Three keyword mechanics based on the theme of time were introduced in Time Spiral: Flash, Split Second, and Suspend. Flash allows a card to be played as though it were an instant, regardless of its card type. Older cards with this ability have been updated with this keyword. Spells with split second prevent other spells or abilities from being played as long as a spell with that keyword is on the stack. Each color has two cards with Split Second – one uncommon and one rare. Suspend echoes the Tempest card Ertai's Meddling and is written on a card as "Suspend X – Cost". The player can pay the alternate suspend cost instead of the mana cost, exile the card, and put X counters on the card. Every turn, during its controller's upkeep, a counter is removed. The card remains exiled and will only come into play only when all the counters are removed from it. Creatures played via Suspend gain Haste. Time Spiral reprised a number of keywords from pre-8th Edition sets, including buyback, echo, flanking, flashback, madness, morph, shadow, and storm.

The only Planar Chaos-specific keyword mechanic is Vanishing, an updated version of an older mechanic, Fading. Vanishing uses time counters to interact with Time Spiral cards and induces sacrifice at the removal of the final counter to make the mechanic more intuitive than its predecessor. The Time Spiral keywords of Suspend, Flash, and Split Second all returned in Planar Chaos, alongside the "timeshifted" mechanics of Echo, Flanking, Kicker, Madness, Morph, and Shadow. Planar Chaos marked the first appearance of spells with Echo costs that did not match their casting costs, as well as the first appearance of single color split cards.

=== Future Sight ===
Future Sight contains more keyword mechanics than any other Magic: The Gathering set ever printed, as of 2007. In addition to reprising Flash, Split Second, Suspend, and Vanishing from earlier in the block, Future Sight continues the block's theme of temporal manipulation with Cycling and Scry, this time as a mechanic in its own right rather than as a bonus rider. Furthermore, the set includes three different forms of "timeshifted" mechanics.

Most directly, Future Sight included the "past-shifted" mechanics from Time Spiral of Echo, Flanking, Kicker, Madness, Morph, and Shadow. However, these mechanics no longer appeared in cards from the past, their native environment. Many cards in Future Sight combine a "timeshifted" ability with an ability that originated in the Time Spiral block. Furthermore, Future Sight freely used all the keyword mechanics that debuted following 8th Edition (Bloodthirst, Convoke, Dredge, Graft, Hellbent, Scry, and Transmute).

Future Sight also included five "alternate-shifted" mechanics that had previously appeared on cards in a non-keyword fashion. These are Deathtouch, Lifelink, Poisonous, Reach, and Shroud. Under current rules, any (nonzero) amount of damage from a creature with Deathtouch to another creature is lethal, and damage from a creature with Lifelink causes its controller to gain that much life. Whenever a creature with Poisonous X deals combat damage to an opponent, that opponent gets X poison counters (ten or more poison counters causes a player to lose the game). Creatures with reach may block as though they had flying. A permanent with shroud cannot be the target of spells or abilities. Four of those mechanics (all but poisonous) have subsequently become "evergreen" and appeared on cards in Core Sets.

Future Sight also introduced the following "future-shifted" mechanics. These mechanics are variants on a past ability, intended to hint at possible variations that could appear in future sets:

- Absorb - This ability has a number, such as Absorb 2. A creature with absorb has the listed number of damage prevented if it would take damage from a given source.
- Aura Swap - Aura Swap allows the player to pay the Aura Swap cost of a card and exchange it with another Aura card in hand.
- Delve - A spell with Delve costs 1 colorless mana less for every card in your graveyard that you exile as you play it.
- Fateseal - Appears in the form Fateseal X. It allows a player to look at X cards on the top of an opponent's library and place some or all of those cards at the top of that opponent's library in any order and the rest on the bottom of their library in any order.
- Fortification & Fortify - Fortifications are a new subtype of artifact. They can be attached to land by paying a "fortify" cost, much as equipment can be attached to creatures by paying an equip cost.
- Frenzy - Frenzy appears in the form of Frenzy X. If a creature with Frenzy attacks and isn't blocked, it gets +X/+0, where X is the frenzy number.
- Grandeur - Grandeur is an ability word that appears on legendary creatures. If a creature with Grandeur is in play, its controller may play its Grandeur ability by discarding a card with the same name.
- Gravestorm - A twist on the Storm ability that occurs on a single card in Future Sight. When a spell with Gravestorm is played, its controller copies it for each permanent put into a graveyard this turn.
- Transfigure - Somewhat similar to the Transmute ability from Ravnica: City of Guilds, a creature in play with Transfigure can be sacrificed with a cost to let its controller search his or her library for another creature with the same converted mana cost and put it into play.
- Slivercycling and Wizardcycling - Variants on Cycling that search for a sliver or wizard (respectively) instead of drawing a card.

Some cards of Future Sight have two keywords that together have a good synergy, like Marshaling Cry that has Cycling and Flashback, so that you can use Cycling and then play the card from the graveyard with Flashback.

== Notable cards ==
Notable cards from Time Spiral include Gemstone Caverns, Momentary Blink, Serra Avenger, and Sudden Shock. Time Spiral had a couple of notable cycles, including five totem artifacts that were references to past creatures, and a cycle of legendary creatures that were references to powerful characters in Dominaria taken from a point in their life before the character reached the peak of his or her power.

A notable card from Planar Chaos is Damnation, a color-shifted Wrath of God.

A notable card from Future Sight is the quite-sought-after Tarmogoyf. It also contains a cycle called "Pacts", which are instants with a mana cost of 0 but a cost that must be paid during the caster's next upkeep to avoid a game loss.

== Critical reception ==
Despite drawing back some old players, the set was not as well received by the larger number of newer players. In Mark Rosewater's "State of Design 2007" article, he goes on to explain reasons why the set was not as successful as they had hoped. The most important reason was that the nostalgic theme left newer players feeling "out of the loop".

== Stub Section about Time Spiral Remastered ==
According to "Gatherer search results". Time Spiral Remastered set has 413 cards.
