= Gavin Verhey =

American game developer (born 1990)

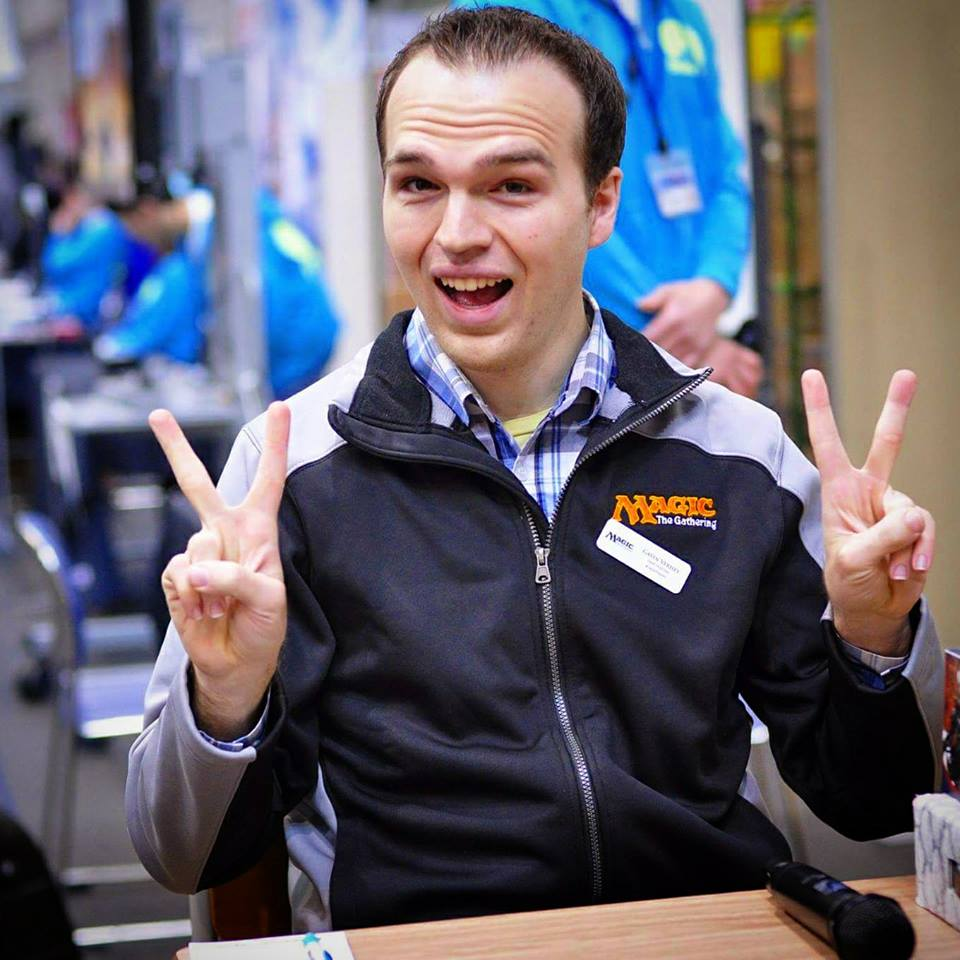
- Verhey at Grand Prix Shizuoka 2017
- Born: March 29, 1990 (age 36)
- Occupation: Game designer

Gavin Verhey (born March 29, 1990) is an American game designer for Magic: The Gathering at Wizards of the Coast.

He has been a member of numerous Magic set Design and Development teams since joining in 2011, including Aether Revolt, Conspiracy, Conspiracy: Take the Crown, Fate Reforged, Gatecrash, From the Vault: Angels, From the Vault: Annihilation, From the Vault: Twenty, Ixalan, Kaladesh, Modern Masters 2017, Oath of the Gatewatch, and Shadows Over Innistrad, in addition to being the lead designer of Archenemy: Nicol Bolas, Commander 2017, and Battlebond. He also currently writes the weekly column Beyond the Basics on the official Magic website. Mark Rosewater considers him part of the fifth generation of Magic designers.

== Career ==
Verhey was formerly a professional Magic: The Gathering player. He wrote strategy articles weekly for Starcitygames.com from February 20, 2009, through October 24, 2011 and also did commentary for SCGLive. He was a host of the Monday Night Magic podcast from episode #9 on June 7, 2006, through episode #281, on October 18, 2011.

In 2010, Verhey created an entirely new Magic format called "Overextended". After Magic R&D chose to adopt a similar format, Modern, for Pro Tour Philadelphia, the Magic R&D team noted that his work on Overextended was a factor in their decision and that they were "very happy to see the outpouring of support for [Verhey's] work and to have this data point of support for a nonrotating format." Later that year, Verhey was hired by Wizards of the Coast to work on Magic.

In addition to designing Magic sets, since March 27, 2012 Verhey has written for Dailymtg.com as a weekly columnist. He first wrote the column ReConstructed, where he critiqued and improved readers' decks on a weekly basis from March 2012 until January 2016, and then began a new weekly column, Beyond the Basics, where he teaches advanced Magic strategy.

In 2017, Gavin became part of the Product Architecture team, a small team inside Magic R&D that "touch[es] all aspects of the set or product, working with the designer, Brand, Packaging Design, and practically every other team inside Wizards to make sure every release is as fantastic as possible from every angle." He was the Product Architect for the Challenger Decks.

In 2020, Verhey was the Lead Deck Architect for the Zendikar Rising expansion. Since 2020, Verhey has hosted the Good Morning Magic! web show on YouTube.

In January 2022, Wizards of the Coast announced additional support for the Pauper format via the newly formed Pauper Format Panel; the panel is led by Verhey along with "six Magic players and personalities from the Pauper community". This panel will provide play recommendations, such as removing or unbanning cards, and will focus on the "health of the format".

== Personal life ==
Verhey grew up in Washington, where he attended the University of Washington.
