= Return to Ravnica =

Block of expansion sets in Magic: The Gathering

- Size: 274 cards (15 Mythic Rare, 53 Rare, 80 Uncommon, 101 Common, 25 Basic Land)
- Mechanics: Overload, Detain, Unleash, Populate, Scavenge
- Designers: Ken Nagle (lead), Zac Hill, Alexis Janson, Mark Rosewater, Ken Troop
- Developers: Erik Lauer (lead), Zac Hill, Dave Humpherys, Tom LaPille, Adam Lee, Billy Moreno, Shawn Main

First set in the block
← Magic 2013	Gatecrash →
← Innistrad Block	Theros Block →

Gatecrash
- A pointed arch of a gate
- Size: 249 cards (15 mythic rares, 53 rares, 80 uncommons, 101 commons)
- Mechanics: Battalion, Bloodrush, Evolve, Cipher, Extort
- Designers: Mark Rosewater (co-lead), Mark Gottlieb (co-lead), Joe Huber, Dave Humpherys, Ethan Fleischer, Shawn Main
- Developers: Dave Humpherys (lead), Zac Hill, Mark Globus, Mark Purvis, Max McCall, Gavin Verhey

Second set in the block
← Return to Ravnica	Dragon's Maze →
← Innistrad Block	Theros Block →

Dragon's Maze
- The Gatecrash symbol arched over the Return to Ravnica symbol
- Size: 156 cards (11 mythic rares, 35 rares, 40 uncommons, 70 commons)
- Designers: Alexis Janson (co-lead), Mark Rosewater (co-lead), Erik Lauer, Aaron Forsythe, Shawn Main, Dan Emmons
- Developers: Zac Hill (lead), Erik Lauer, Mark Globus, Mark Gottlieb, Masami Ibamoto, Sam Stoddard

Third set in the block
← Gatecrash	Modern Masters →
← Innistrad Block	Theros Block →

Return to Ravnica is a Magic: The Gathering block, consisting of Return to Ravnica (October 5, 2012), Gatecrash (February 1, 2013), and Dragon's Maze (May 3, 2013). It is the second block set on the plane of Ravnica, after the Ravnica block, and again focuses on the multicolor cards and ten guilds of Ravnica. Return to Ravnica focuses on five guilds: the Izzet League, Cult of Rakdos, Golgari Swarm, Azorius Senate, and Selesnya Conclave. Gatecrash focuses on the other five guilds: the Boros Legion, House Dimir, The Orzhov Syndicate, The Gruul Clans, and The Simic Combine. All ten guilds appear in Dragon's Maze.

== Storyline ==
The story told vaguely in the cards deals with the Izzet League searching for something deep within Ravnica's bowels and the other guilds responding to their mysterious actions. This is largely due to the collapse of the Guildpact, which kept the guilds in relative peace for almost 10,000 years, mainly because of the desires of the parun (original founder) of the House Dimir, Szadek, who signed the Guildpact on the condition that the Dimir remain a secret. The storyline of Gatecrash deals with the rise of another faction that does not ally with any of the Guilds, referred to in-game as the "Gateless". The Gateless were referred to in the first set in certain cards as well. While the Gateless are rising to power, the guilds are in the process of trying to thwart each other, adding layers to the story. The Dragon's Maze set marks the culmination of the Izzet League's research into the depths of Ravnica, the eponymous Dragon's Maze (also known as the Implicit Maze), a path that treads all 10 guild gates in order to find and activate an energy source of enough power to allow the winner of the maze to subjugate and control all of the other guilds. By this point, the other guilds have gotten suspicious of something, partially by the Dimir spreading rumors, about the Izzet's true purpose for their experiments, and have begun to arm themselves for an all-out war. Niv-Mizzet, leader of the Izzet League, seeing it as the only way to avoid a complete obliteration of all the guilds by each other, proposes a challenge in which each guild selects a champion in order to navigate and conquer the maze and subsequently the other guilds. Each Champion, also called a Mazerunner, will have to traverse the maze, and they will have to deal with other guilds' attempts to halt their advance. Like in the original Ravnica block, each Mazerunner is a Legendary Creature card.

=== Guilds ===
Most of the citizenry are members of one of the ten guilds, each a unique organization with its own rules and specialties and specializing in a unique two-color combination of magic.

- The Izzet League: The mad scientists and crazed engineers of Ravnica, the Izzet specialize in blue and red magic.
- The Azorius Senate: The order-obsessed lawmakers of Ravnica, the Azorius specialize in white and blue magic.
- The Selesnya Conclave: The utilitarian nature-lovers of Ravnica, the Selesnya specialize in green and white magic.
- The Golgari Swarm: The rot farmers and necromancers of Ravnica, the Golgari specialize in black and green magic.
- The Cult of Rakdos: The demon-worshipping hedonists-for-hire of Ravnica, the Rakdos specialize in red and black magic.
- The Gruul Clans: Formerly the protectors of uncivilized nature, the brutish Gruul were sidelined by the other green guilds as the city expanded. They specialize in green and red magic.
- The Simic Combine: The extreme biologists of Ravnica, the Simic specialize in blue and green magic.
- The House Dimir: The subtle criminals working both for whoever hired them and for their own purposes, the Dimir specialize in black and blue magic.
- The Orzhov Syndicate: "The Church of Deals", the Orzhov honor money above all else. They specialize in black and white magic.
- The Boros Legion: The militaristic law enforcers of Ravnica, the Boros specialize in white and red magic.

=== The Implicit Maze ===
The maze's origins are shrouded in mystery, but some details have been figured out by the Planeswalker Jace Beleren and the dragon Niv-Mizzet. It was created by the parun of the Azorius Senate, Azor. His intentions are unknown, but since it goes through various landmarks of all ten guilds, it seems to be a test of teamwork. However, the prize is too great for any guild to work with another and then share the prize, so it devolved into a huge competition with each guild using its specialties to attack all the other maze-runners on their turf. The Maze-Runners are as follows:

- Melek (Izzet): A Weird Wizard who was created by Izzet mages for the sole purpose of being the perfect Maze-Runner, his biggest obstacle might be the desire of Ral Zarek to run the maze for the Izzet. His 2/4 card allows players to play instants and sorceries from the top of their library and make a free copy of them.
- Vorel (Simic): A Human Merfolk whose strategic mind drew him from leading his small Gruul clan to the Simic Combine, he is one of the most passionate about the biomancy of his new guild. His 1/4 card allows his controller to multiply the counters on permanents they control.
- Ruric Thar (Gruul): An Ogre Warrior (or possibly two that share the same two-headed body) who remains the only creature to challenge Borborygmos for leadership of the Clans and live to tell the tale. Ruric's 6/6 card inflicts a penalty of six life to players for each noncreature spell they cast.
- Tajic (Boros): A Human Soldier who's highly regarded in the Legion because of his zealous battlefield tactics. His 2/2 Indestructible card gets +5/+5 when attacking with at least two other creatures.
- Emmara Tandris (Selesnya): An Elf Shaman who was trained as a healer, she was selected by Trostani because of her selflessness and duty of protecting the Conclave. Her 5/7 card prevents all damage done to creature tokens on her side of the field.
- Varolz (Golgari): A Troll Warrior who, instead of weakening with sustained damage, actually grows stronger. His 2/2 card gives all creatures in his controller's graveyard Scavenge and can regenerate by sacrificing another creature.
- Teysa (Orzhov): A Human Advisor who, while she doesn't actually rule the Syndicate, has a major hand in the workings of the Orzhov. Her 4/4 card with Vigilance and Protection from Creatures destroys all creatures that deal damage to her controller and gives her controller a 1/1 white and black Spirit token for each one.
- Lavinia (Azorius): A Human Soldier who is one of the best arresters in the Tenth District, she believes in stopping at nothing to uphold the law, even if that means beating the others through the maze. Her 4/4 card has Protection from Red and Detains all opponents' nonland permanents with a converted mana cost of 4 or less.
- Mirko Vosk (Dimir): A Vampire who's especially skilled at finding secrets and exploiting his enemies' weaknesses, he's the perfect choice for the Dimir. His 2/4 card with Flying gives "Milling" players a distinct advantage: Whenever he deals combat damage, the player he targeted mills cards from his deck until they've milled four lands.
- Exava (Rakdos): A Human Cleric who commands a massive horde of blood-crazed warriors and has a wide variety of sadistic spells at her disposal. Her 3/3 card with First Strike, Unleash, and Haste gives all other creatures on her side of the field with +1/+1 counters Haste.

== Set details ==
The Return to Ravnica block features a return of the hybrid mana cost as well as the famous "dual shock lands" from the original Ravnica block. The set also features many cycles of cards that are aligned with certain guilds. Each guild has a charm (last featured in the Shards of Alara block) that offers a caster the choice of three options. Each guild has a multicolored land known as a Guildgate and also a shockland; controlling a Guildgate allows a player to tap it for one mana of either color of that guild. Each guild has a legendary leader (in Return to Ravnica or Gatecrash), a legendary champion (in Dragon's Maze) and a guildmage. Return to Ravnica features the Planeswalkers of Jace, Architect of Thought (The most recent incarnation of the blue member of the Lorwyn Five, this time living in his adopted home of Ravnica) and the new black/green Vraska the Unseen (Her name is actually derived from the Czech for "ditch" or "furrow", probably as a reference to her rise to power in the Golgari). Gatecrash's Planeswalkers are Gideon, Champion of Justice (The newest version of the white-aligned warrior) and Domri Rade (A red/green who fits in perfectly with the Gruul). Dragon's Maze only has one Planeswalker: Ral Zarek, a red/blue Izzet mage who would rather run the maze himself rather than let Melek do it. The homunculus Fblthp (Who only shows up in the art and flavor text of the card Totally Lost) has also become quite popular, spawning plushies, a Twitter feed, and his own website.

=== Dragon's Maze ===
Dragon's Maze features all ten guilds from Ravnica. Beyond just printing new cards for the guilds, Dragon's Maze adds a whole new element to each one, such as adding some offensive creatures to the otherwise spell-centric Izzet League. In the prerelease sealed format, players chose their guild and received a guild pack of the appropriate guild. The guild pack also contained a second "secret" guild that shared one of the two colors of the chosen guild. Each player that attended the prerelease received the same promotional card, Maze's End, which could not be played in the sealed deck (as opposed to the prereleases for Return to Ravnica and Gatecrash). The draft format for Dragon's Maze also reverts to the normal format of drafting the three sets in a block in reverse order of their release, in this case Dragon's Maze – Gatecrash – Return to Ravnica.

Booster packs for Dragon's Maze do not contain basic lands. Instead each booster contains either a guildgate, a shock land, or the mythic rare land Maze's End from Dragon's Maze in the appropriate ratio of their rarities. The Shock lands have the appropriate expansion symbols of Return to Ravnica and Gatecrash, but the Gates are part of Dragon's Maze and have a Dragon's Maze expansion symbol making them part of the set and thus marking the first time cards other than basic lands are printed multiple times within the same block. In limited events, an exceptional rule was set up, which Shock lands in Dragon's Maze boosters are treated as if they are cards from Dragon's Maze during sealed or booster draft.

Dragon's Maze features the planeswalker Ral Zarek. Another returning feature of the set is the presence of the Guild champions, all of which are in the rare slot, as opposed to mythic rare. At one point in development, some of the Champions were going to be mythic and much more powerful while others were going to be rare, but it was eventually decided that all the Champions had to be equal in terms of rarity and power. The set marks the return of Split Cards, which have two separate effects printed on the same card but with different mana costs, only now in the form of "Fuse" cards (explained below).

== Mechanics ==
Five new guild mechanics are introduced in both Return to Ravnica and Gatecrash. Each of the ten guild mechanics introduced in the previous sets is also featured in Dragon's Maze. According to Mark Rosewater, each mechanic was designed to go along with the corresponding one from the original Ravnica block.

- Overload (Izzet):. Just like the uncontrolled experiments of the Izzet, if its controller pays the more expensive overload cost of a card instead of the normal cost, that spell has its text changed by replacing all instances of "target" with "each". This effectively extends the effects of the given spell to any and all other possible legal targets. For example, a spell with overload may read "Target creature you control gets +1/+0 and is unblockable until end of turn." Overloading this spell would cause it to affect "Each creature you control" instead.
- Unleash (Rakdos): Embodying the Rakdos ideal of putting on a good show, if a card has Unleash, its controller has the option of having it enter the battlefield with a +1/+1 counter on it. Creatures with Unleash are unable to block if they have a +1/+1 counter on them.
- Detain (Azorius): Showing the will of the Azorius to uphold the law before all else, Detain occurs as an effect of a spell or ability, most commonly appearing on triggered abilities that trigger when the creature they're printed on enters the battlefield. While a permanent is detained, it is basically "locked-down" for a turn, being unable to attack or block(if it is a creature), or have its abilities activated. This effect lasts until the player who caused it begins his or her next turn.
- Populate (Selesnya): Used to multiply their "one for all" guild, whenever a spell or ability tells a player to populate, that player puts a creature token onto the battlefield that is a copy of a creature token that player controls.
- Scavenge (Golgari): To utilize the dead (something they do best), when a creature with Scavenge is in the graveyard, its owner may pay its Scavenge cost and upon exiling that creature card from the graveyard, allows him/her to put +1/+1 counters equal to the power of the scavenged creature on target creature on the battlefield. Scavenge can only be activated as a sorcery.
- Evolve (Simic): Embodying the guild's focus on improving nature, if a creature with Evolve is on the battlefield when another creature with a higher power or toughness comes into play under its owner's control, the creature with Evolve gets a +1/+1 counter.
- Bloodrush (Gruul): Used to represent the clans' eagerness to charge into conflict, cards with Bloodrush can be discarded for their Bloodrush cost in order to bolster an attacking creature with a beneficial effect, though you do have to discard the card bloodrushed. This effect is similar to the Channel keyword, used in the Kamigawa block.
- Battalion (Boros): Representing the Boros ideal of working in concert, when a creature with Battalion attacks with at least two other creatures, the effect on the Battalion creature triggers.
- Extort (Orzhov): Reflecting the guild's emphasis on payment and debts, if a creature with Extort is on the battlefield, upon casting a spell, if you pay the Extort cost (either one White or Black mana), each of your opponents will lose 1 life and you gain that total amount of life lost by all opponents. Each instance of Extort may only be paid for once.
- Cipher (Dimir): Symbolizing the house's focus on utilizing covert agents, when you cast a spell with cipher, you may exile it upon resolution and 'encode' the spell effect onto a creature you control on the battlefield. Then, whenever that creature deals combat damage to a player, its controller may cast a copy of the encoded card without paying its mana cost. This is similar to "Isochron Scepter", however, Isochron Scepter has different conditions for casting a spell (converted mana cost of two or less).

One new mechanic was introduced in Dragon's Maze:

- Fuse: A new mechanic appearing on split cards, a returning card type. "Fuse" allows the controller of a split card to cast both halves simultaneously by combining and paying both mana costs together.

There are many cards that deal with the Gates, especially in the third set, including a cycle of Gatekeepers that have an effect if you control two or more Gates and a card that lets you win immediately if you control all ten.

== Notable cards ==
Notable cards include the "shock lands" cycle, the "charm" cycle, Abrupt Decay, Deathrite Shaman, Burning-Tree Emissary, Domri Rade, Sphinx's Revelation, Goblin Electromancer, Maze's End, Obzedat, Ghost Council, Blood Baron of Vizkopa, and Voice of Resurgence
