= Battle for Zendikar =

Block of expansion sets in Magic: The Gathering

- A fracturing hedron
- Released: October 2, 2015
- Size: 274 cards
- Mechanics: Rally, Landfall, Awaken, Devoid, Converge, Ingest
- Designers: Mark Rosewater (lead), Ian Duke, Dan Emmons, Ethan Fleischer, Dave Guskin, Ari Levitch
- Developers: Erik Lauer (lead), Tim Aten, Kelley Digges, Ian Duke, Ben Hayes, Shawn Main, Yoni Skolnik, Matt Tabak
- Development code: Blood
- Expansion code: BFZ

First set in the Battle for Zendikar block
Battle for Zendikar	Oath of the Gatewatch
← Magic Origins	Oath of the Gatewatch →
← Khans of Tarkir block	Shadows over Innistrad block →

Oath of the Gatewatch
- Kozilek blade projections
- Released: January 22, 2016
- Size: 184 Cards
- Mechanics: Cohort, Support, Surge
- Designers: Ethan Fleischer (lead), Graeme Hopkins, Ari Levitch, Ken Nagle, Adam Prosak, Mark Rosewater
- Developers: Ian Duke (lead), Dave Humpherys, Jackie Lee, Adam Prosak, Gavin Verhey
- Development code: Sweat
- Expansion code: OGW

Second set in the Battle for Zendikar block
Battle for Zendikar	Oath of the Gatewatch
← Battle for Zendikar	Shadows over Innistrad →
← Khans of Tarkir block	Shadows over Innistrad block →

Battle for Zendikar is a Magic: The Gathering expansion block consisting of the sets Battle for Zendikar and Oath of the Gatewatch. It sees the return of full-art basic lands, last seen in the Zendikar block. It is also the first block in Magic (since the Shadowmoor block) to use the new Two-Block Paradigm, wherein each block has two sets instead of the three that were previously used (the last block having three sets being the Khans of Tarkir block).

== Story ==
=== Battle for Zendikar ===
Battle for Zendikar revolves around the Eldrazi, ancient monstrosities that are bent on destroying the entire plane of Zendikar, within which they were once imprisoned, and their fight against the Allies defending their home plane. The creature cards are split along these lines, with most being either on the Eldrazi side or the Ally side. Eldrazi cards are generally very powerful or aid in playing them, while Ally cards give bonuses to each other whenever one comes into play.

As the Eldrazi are decimating the plane, six Planeswalkers each have their own role in the resistance. Jace Beleren, a logical mage, and Ugin, an ancient dragon, are working together to find a way to defeat the Eldrazi; Gideon, a human who fights for justice and honor, is rounding up the survivors; Ob Nixilis, a demon who lost his powers as a Planeswalker, is trying to regain his abilities; Kiora, a merfolk native to Zendikar, is eager to use her new discoveries on other planes to help her home plane, and Nissa Revane, an elf from Zendikar, who lost her connection to the land and regains it in a surprisingly powerful manner. In the original Zendikar block, there were three chief Eldrazi, but most now are of Ulamog's lineage.

As the block's story line proceeds, Jace disagrees with Ugin on how to handle the rampage of Ulamog and his brood: Ugin advises against destroying the titan, Ulamog, as the ineffable nature of the Eldrazi means it is unclear if killing their physical form will destroy them entirely, or merely free them to roam across the Blind Eternities, devouring planes unchecked. Jace, Gideon and Nissa settle on a plan with the survivors of the army that retook Sea Gate to channel the natural leylines on Zendikar in tandem with the Hedrons to encircle Ulamog, trapping the Eldrazi again. As the battle rages around the ruined city, the plan appears to initially succeed.

However, the demon Ob Nixilis, having survived an apparently fatal encounter with Nissa earlier, returns to face the Planeswalkers again, interrupting the hedron alignment and subverting the power involved for his own purpose - regenerating his "spark", the essential power that resides within all Planeswalkers. As the hedron circle crumbles, Ob Nixilis uses his newly refound powers to raise the second of the three Eldrazi Titans - Kozilek.

=== Oath of the Gatewatch ===
Whilst Kiora leads a one-woman sea assault on Kozilek, Gideon, Jace and Nissa find themselves outflanked by Ob Nixilis. The demon attempts to trap them on Zendikar to be destroyed by the Eldrazi, much as he himself was, but is stopped by the unexpected arrival of Chandra Nalaar, who frees them to continue the fight. Ob Nixilis decides to planeswalk away and leave his revenge for later. However, the battle on Zendikar is going poorly. Kiora, the only planeswalker left to represent the Zendikari, is defeated by Kozilek and almost loses her prized possession, the Bident of Thassa which she obtained on Theros. The Zendikari army has been devastated, and Tazri steps up to reorganize it in Gideon's absence.

The four planeswalkers emerge from Ob Nixilis' erstwhile prison to discover the Sea Gate destroyed and the Zendikari in disarray. They will not be able to trap both Eldrazi using the Hedrons, and none of them are powerful enough to fight alone. Jace suggests simply planeswalking away, but Gideon suggests they swear an oath as they overlook the Sea Gate—the Oath of the Gatewatch, in which they promise to cooperate to defend the Multiverse against extraplanar threats. And since the Eldrazi are extraplanar threats and cannot be contained, the newly formed Gatewatch have only one option: kill them outright.

Jace lays out their battle plan: the corporeal forms of the Eldrazi, monstrous though they are, are only part of their existence; the rest of them reside in the Blind Eternities, the whirling chaos between planes. This is why Ugin has always counseled against destroying the Eldrazi's corporeal forms. Jace's solution is to draw Ulamog and Kozilek entirely into Zendikar so that they can be fully slain. Whilst Gideon, Kiora, Chandra, Tazri and the Zendikari army distract the Eldrazi with battle, Jace and Nissa are to use the remaining Hedrons to anchor them in corporeal form. The plane of Zendikar itself, which has been trying to consume the titans ever since they were imprisoned there, will do the rest. Or, at least, that's the plan. Zendikar quickly begins to struggle over the mouthful it has bitten off, and Nissa and Kiora, both Zendikari natives, almost come to blows over the fate of their home. It's Chandra who has the answer: Nissa redirects the last of Zendikar's mana to her, and Chandra employs a purifying fire that annihilates both Ulamog and Kozilek.

In the aftermath, Zendikar begins to rebuild. Gideon cedes his role as Commander-General to Tazri. Jace still has his own concerns: of the three Planeswalkers who originally imprisoned the Eldrazi here on Zendikar—Ugin, Sorin Markov, and Nahiri the Lithomancer—the latter two have failed to help; and when Ugin himself arrives, he has only criticism for Jace's impetuousness at destroying two lifeforms that are older than worlds, their purposes in the Multiverse unknown. Jace decides to hunt down Sorin Markov, who was last seen on the plane of Innistrad.

== Mechanics ==
Battle for Zendikar features a number of new mechanics as well as a returning mechanic in Landfall:

- Devoid: Devoid is a characteristic-defining keyword which sets the card's color to colorless, regardless of the mana required to cast them. While functionally colorless, these cards were numbered in the set according to the colors of mana required in their casting cost. This is unique to Eldrazi-themed cards in the set.
- Ingest: Ingest is a new keyword appearing on creatures in Battle for Zendikar. It is a triggered ability that exiles the top card of the opponent's library whenever a creature with ingest deals combat damage to him or her. Similarly to devoid, this is unique to the Eldrazi in the set.
- Awaken: Awaken is a keyword found on instants and sorceries in the set, which allows the player to cast them for an alternate cost which in addition to other effects of the spell, turns a land into a creature with haste with a number of +1/+1 counters on it as defined by the card. This mechanic is unique to cards themed around the Zendikari natives.
- Rally: Rally is a keyword found solely on creatures with the card type Ally in the set. Whenever an Ally creature enters the battlefield, it triggers its own Rally ability, along with those of any other Allies currently on the battlefield.
- Converge: Converge is a keyword found on instants, sorceries, creatures and enchantments, and again is found solely on Zendikari-themed cards. Cards with this keyword gain additional effects, or have their effect become stronger, based on how many colors of mana are used to cast them.
- Landfall: Landfall is a triggered ability returning from Zendikar and Worldwake, which triggers whenever a land enters the battlefield under your control.

== Zendikar Expeditions ==
Zendikar Expeditions is a set of 45 (25 in Battle for Zendikar, 20 in Oath of the Gatewatch) premium cards printed as part of the Battle for Zendikar block, consisting of rare land cards that were previously printed in other sets. The majority of these cards were highly sought-after when they were new, and now have a foil, full-art face, with new art and a special hedron-themed frame, which led to Battle for Zendikar being one of the most highly anticipated sets in recent memory. While the majority of the cards' original printings were at Rare, the Expeditions were distributed at roughly the same level as foil Mythic Rares.

== Reception ==
Louis Kemner, for CBR, commented that players were "a little disappointed" by Battle for Zendikar due to the "slog against the Eldrazi". Kemner wrote, "Landfall returned, but otherwise, Battle for Zendikar focused on the fight, from the converge ability to cohort and surge. In hindsight, none of those abilities were memorable or particularly interesting, while the original Zendikar's landfall, kicker, Traps, expedition enchantments and Ally tribal themes are all much more memorable and thematic. Battle for Zendikar's mechanical identity is little more than 'five colors fighting together against weird colorless creatures.' This completely ignored what players loved about the original Zendikar block: the adventure. Additionally, there have been several 'war' blocks before and after Battle for Zendikar […]. Zendikar gave up its thrilling adventure theme for yet another war, and players were getting tired of so many Eldrazi".
