= Magic: The Gathering core sets, 2009–2015 =

Seven Magic: The Gathering core sets have been released since 2009: Magic 2010, Magic 2011, Magic 2012, Magic 2013, Magic 2014, Magic 2015, and Magic Origins. Unlike 10th Edition and previous core sets, roughly half of each core set was composed of entirely new cards. Beginning with Magic 2010, Wizards decided to introduce new cards into core sets so that they could be relevant for both new and seasoned players. Starting with Magic 2011, core sets have included "returning mechanics", or non-evergreen keywords with cards printed in just one core set. All of these core sets were released in the summer of the year prior to the year in the title (for example, Magic 2010 was released in 2009).

After Magic Origins, Wizards of the Coast stopped production of core sets, opting for a new model where two blocks with two sets each are made each year, rather than one block of three sets and a core set. Magic head designer Mark Rosewater wrote that the core set's dual identity of needing to interest established players while being simple enough for new players lead to "odd compromises", and cited the potential and upsides of doing two blocks per year, such as visiting new settings and revisiting old ones faster. Later in 2017, Wizards of the Coast announced that core sets would be returning under a different name, starting with Core Set 2019, released on July 13, 2018.

== Magic 2010 ==
Magic 2010
- Released: July 17, 2009
- Size: 249 cards (15 Mythic Rare, 53 Rare, 60 Uncommon, 101 Common, 20 Basic Lands)
- Designers: Aaron Forsythe (lead), Bill Rose, Mark Rosewater, Brady Dommermuth, Brian Tinsman, Devin Low
- Developers: Erik Lauer (lead), Mike Turian, Tom LaPille, Greg Marques
- Expansion code: M10
← Alara Reborn	Masters Edition III →

Magic 2010 was released on July 17, 2009. It is the eleventh core set for Magic: The Gathering. It is the first core set since Limited Edition Beta (which included two cards accidentally left out of the original Limited Edition Alpha) to feature new cards; every core set between Beta and Magic 2010 had contained only reprints from previous sets. About half the cards were new, and the rest were reprints.

Magic 2010 (also known as M10) additionally marked a major shift in the way Wizards of the Coast produced and marketed the "core" set of their marquee trading card game, Magic: The Gathering. M10 was the first core set since Revised (the third edition) to not be labeled with an ordinal number. Another important marketing change starting with M10, was Wizards of the Coast's decision to release a new core set every year, instead of every two years, as they had been doing since 1995. Previous policy regarding which cards to reprint in the core sets led to the Core set product drifting away from its intended function. 112 new cards were printed in M10, the remainder being reprints.

M10 was also the first core set to use the "mythic rare" rarity, as well as the first core set to include planeswalkers, a relatively new card type which had been first introduced in 2007. All five of the initial set of planeswalkers from Lorwyn were reprinted in M10 as mythic rares.

=== Rule changes ===
Wizards of the Coast also overhauled the core rules of the game with the introduction of Magic 2010. The changes included the renaming of several zones and actions of the game, the elimination of the 'mana burn' rule, and more relevant for gameplay, an alteration to the way combat damage was assigned. This was the first major alteration of the game rules since the introduction of 6th Edition rules in 1999, and was instituted to make the game more streamlined and intuitive. For example, previous damage-assignment rules would allow a creature to, in the words of Magic Rules Manager Mark Gottlieb, "swing its fist to punch, vanish from the battlefield, and [still] have that punch land." The rule changes, as with most rules changes, raised some controversy.

== Magic 2011 ==
Magic 2011
- M11
- Released: July 16, 2010
- Size: 249 cards(101 Commons plus 20 lands, 60 Uncommons, 53 Rares, 15 Mythic Rares)
- Keywords: Scry
- Designers: Aaron Forsythe (lead), Doug Beyer, Mark Globus, Tom LaPille, Gregory Marques
- Developers: Erik Lauer (lead), Dave Guskin, Tom LaPille, Kenneth Nagle
- Expansion code: M11
← Rise of the Eldrazi	Scars of Mirrodin →

Magic 2011 was released on July 16, 2010. It was the twelfth core set for Magic: The Gathering. The set contained 110 new cards and 139 reprints.

Magic 2011 contains the keyword scry. This marks the first time that a mechanic from an expert level set had been printed in a core set, without making that mechanic evergreen, or permanently available for use in all future sets. This set also introduced the concept of "planeswalker signature cards": cards of lesser rarities that were tied directly to the central planeswalker characters of the set (ex. "Ajani's Pridemate" and "Ajani's Mantra" were included as a reference to the planeswalker "Ajani Goldmane"). These cards were made to make the identity of the planeswalkers more accessible to players, as the planeswalker cards themselves were only available in mythic rarities.

A notable cycle first printed in M11 was the "Titan cycle" of Sun Titan, Frost Titan, Grave Titan, Inferno Titan, Primeval Titan.

== Magic 2012 ==
Magic 2012
- Released: July 15, 2011
- Size: 249 cards
- Mechanics: Bloodthirst
- Designers: Mark Globus (lead), Doug Beyer, Aaron Forsythe, Ken Nagle
- Developers: Tom LaPille (lead), Kelly Digges, Peter Schaefer, Mike Turian, Steve Warner, Dave Humpherys
- Expansion code: M12
← New Phyrexia	Innistrad →

Magic 2012 was released on July 15, 2011. It is the thirteenth core set for Magic: The Gathering. This set has 152 reprints and 97 new cards in it.

Magic 2012 was the first set to use "dies" to mean a creature being put into a graveyard from the battlefield. It is the first core set to use the keyword "hexproof", a keyword ability replacing the text "cannot be the target of spells or abilities your opponents control". Cards with this ability had been printed in previous sets, but the ability was not given a keyword. The returning mechanic in Magic 2012 was "bloodthirst". When creatures with bloodthirst are played, they gain a boost to their power and toughness if an opponent was already dealt damage that turn. For example, a 2/3 creature with Bloodthirst 3 could enter the battlefield as a 5/6. Bloodthirst was previously seen in Guildpact and Future Sight.

== Magic 2013 ==
Magic 2013
- Released: July 13, 2012
- Size: 249 cards
- Mechanics: Exalted
- Designers: Doug Beyer (lead), Aaron Forsythe, Graeme Hopkins, Ryan Miller, Mark Purvis
- Developers: Zac Hill (lead), Ethan Fleischer, Mark L. Gottlieb, Tom LaPille, Max McCall, Ryan Miller
← Avacyn Restored	Return to Ravnica →

Magic 2013 was released on July 13, 2012. The tagline for the set is "Face a Greater Challenge." The set has 141 reprints and 108 new cards.

Magic 2013 is the first core set to have a multicolored card, Nicol Bolas, Planeswalker (Bolas is also referenced on a number of other cards). It is the second Magic core set (Tenth Edition was the first) to feature legendary cards; it featured one legendary creature of each color, plus the artifact Akroma's Memorial. Magic 2013 contains the Exalted mechanic, which first appeared in the Shards of Alara block. It is featured as the "returning mechanic" in Magic 2013, as both reprinted Alara cards and new cards with Exalted could be found in Magic 2013. The Exalted ability gives a creature you control +1/+1 when it is the only creature attacking that combat, and multiple instances of Exalted are cumulative (e.g. 3 sources of Exalted will give a lone attacking creature +3/+3).

== Magic 2014 ==
Magic 2014
- Released: July 19, 2013
- Size: 249 cards
- Mechanics: Slivers
- Designers: Mark Globus (lead), Tom LaPille, Adam Lee, Shawn Main, Ken Troop
- Developers: Dave Guskin (lead), Kelly Digges, Aaron Forsythe, James Hata, Zac Hill, Max McCall, and with contributions from Matt Tabak
← Modern Masters	Theros →

Magic 2014 was released on July 19, 2013. The tagline for the set is "Ignite your Spark." As Bolas was the mascot of M13, Chandra was the mascot of M14. The returning mechanic of Magic 2014 is Slivers, a series of creatures of which each grants an ability to each Sliver.

Magic 2014 marked a change to the Legend rule. It made the "Indestructible" effect a keyword, and changed the phrasing for unblockable creatures to "can't be blocked." Slivers in Magic 2014 also worked subtly differently from Slivers in earlier Magic; they now only affected Slivers owned by the same controller, rather than all Slivers in the game. Slivers also received an art redesign that de-emphasized their original beak-headed, one-clawed, one-tailed insect-like appearance, and instead became monstrous humanoids whose appearance varied heavily by card, but had "normal" features such as faces and eyes. This redesign proved controversial; one reviewer noted "slivers are one of the most iconic designs in all of Magic: The Gathering. To essentially muddle them down into just another humanoid monster thing is really disappointing." Wizards of the Coast acknowledged the negative feedback, noting that some players disliked the new art style, and included a card in Magic 2015 that used the original Sliver appearance in Sliver Hive.

== Magic 2015 ==
Magic 2015
- Released: July 18, 2014
- Size: 269 cards
- Mechanics: Convoke
- Designers: Aaron Forsythe, Max McCall, Shawn Main, Jenna Helland, Mike Gills
← Conspiracy	Khans of Tarkir →

Magic 2015 was released on July 18, 2014. Magic 2015 made the second major change to the card frame in Magic's history (the first being in Eighth Edition). Changes include a slight font change (Starting with Magic 2015, an in-house font known as Beleren will be used rather than the Matrix Bold font), the addition of a holofoil stamp in the bottom center of all rare and mythic rare cards, a slightly narrower black border, and a redesign of the collector's info at the bottom of each card. The new border made it easier for machines to read the cards, helping to prevent mispackaging. Advertising for the set featured the planeswalker Garruk Wildspeaker, with a tagline of "Hunt Bigger Game."

Magic 2015 includes the mechanic "Convoke", which originally appeared in Ravnica: City of Guilds. This mechanic allows a player to use their creatures to help cast spells with Convoke. It also includes 15 cards designed by notable non-employee Magic fans, such as Richard Garriott, George Fan, Markus Persson, and Edmund McMillen, some of which also appear in Duels of the Planeswalkers 2015.

== Magic Origins ==
Magic Origins
- Released: July 17, 2015
- Size: 272 cards
- Mechanics: Scry, Prowess, Renown, Spell Mastery, Menace
- Designers: Shawn Main (lead), Mark Gottlieb, Ari Levitch, Nik Davidson, Ian Duke
- Developers: Sam Stoddard (lead), Dave Humpherys, Ian Duke, Dan Emmons, Ethan Fleischer, Ari Levitch, with contributions from Matt Tabak
← Dragons of Tarkir (standard-legal) / Modern Masters (chronological)	Battle for Zendikar →

Magic Origins was released on July 17, 2015. Magic Origins told the origin stories for 5 planeswalkers who are featured in sets after Origins. It featured a cycle of double-faced cards (originally used in Innistrad) that have a legendary creature on one side representing the character before their transformation, and a planeswalker on the reverse face that represents them after gaining their new power.

The set introduced the mechanics of renown, spell mastery, and menace. It also features cards with the prowess mechanic, which was introduced in Khans of Tarkir block, and the scry mechanic, which was introduced in Mirrodin block.

In February 2015, Wizards of the Coast said that it would be an introductory product "like a core set", and it was published in the time period that a core set would have taken up during the pattern established by Magic 2010. After Origins, Magic switched to a new schedule where each year contained 2 blocks, and each block contained 2 sets.
