= Khans of Tarkir =

Block of expansion sets in Magic: The Gathering

- A shield with two swords crossed in front of it
- Released: September 26, 2014
- Size: 269 cards (15 mythic rare, 53 rare, 80 uncommon, 101 common, 20 basic land)
- Mechanics: Morph, Prowess, Delve, Outlast, Ferocious, Raid
- Designers: Mark Rosewater (lead), Mark L. Gottlieb, Zac Hill, Adam Lee, Shawn Main, Billy Moreno, and Ken Nagle
- Developers: Erik Lauer (lead), Doug Beyer, David Humpherys, Tom LaPille, Shawn Main, and Adam Prosak, with contributions from Matt Tabak
- Development code: Huey
- Expansion code: KTK

First set in the Khans of Tarkir block
Khans of Tarkir	Fate Reforged	Dragons of Tarkir
← Magic 2015	Fate Reforged →
← Theros Block	Battle for Zendikar block →

Fate Reforged
- Released: January 23, 2015
- Size: 185 cards (10 mythic rare, 35 rare, 60 uncommon, 70 common, 10 basic land)
- Mechanics: Manifest, Bolster, Dash, Prowess, Delve, Ferocious
- Designers: Ken Nagle (lead), Jennifer Clarke Wilkes, Ethan Fleischer, David Humpherys, Mark Rosewater, and Gavin Verhey
- Developers: David Humpherys (lead), Ian Duke, Mark L. Gottlieb, Ben Hayes, Ryan Spain, with contributions from Matt Tabak
- Development code: Dewey
- Expansion code: FRF

Second set in the Khans of Tarkir block
Khans of Tarkir	Fate Reforged	Dragons of Tarkir
← Khans of Tarkir	Dragons of Tarkir →
← Theros Block	"Blood" Block →

Dragons of Tarkir
- Head of a dragon
- Released: March 27, 2015
- Size: 264 cards (15 mythic rare, 53 rare, 80 uncommon, 101 common, 15 basic land)
- Mechanics: Megamorph, Bolster, Dash, Exploit, Formidable, Rebound
- Designers: Mark L. Gottlieb (lead), Dan Emmons, Graeme Hopkins, Colin Kawakami, Mark Rosewater, and Sam Stoddard
- Developers: Tom LaPille and David Humpherys (leads), Tim Aten, Colin Kawakami, Erik Lauer, Ken Nagle, Sam Stoddard, and Gerry Thompson; with contributions from Matt Tabak
- Development code: Louie
- Expansion code: DTK

Third set in the Khans of Tarkir block
Khans of Tarkir	Fate Reforged	Dragons of Tarkir
← Fate Reforged	Modern Masters 2015 Edition →
← Theros Block	Battle for Zendikar Block →

Khans of Tarkir is a Magic: The Gathering block consisting of Khans of Tarkir (September 26, 2014), Fate Reforged (January 23, 2015), and Dragons of Tarkir (March 27, 2015). The block's setting is based on a mix of cultures of Central and East Asia.

== Storyline ==
=== Khans of Tarkir ===
The plane of Tarkir was once dominated by dragons, but humans succeeded at wiping them out in a massive war over a thousand years ago. Today Tarkir is a battle-torn realm where five clans feud for supremacy. As presented in Khans of Tarkir, the five clans focus on "wedges", or sets of three colors that are rooted in two colors and one "enemy" color across from it. Each wedge is the colors of a clan of warriors that venerate a certain quality of the dragon, and an anatomical feature that represents it. The clans also make use of the "Morph" mechanic, returning from the Onslaught block, which allows creatures to be cast face-down as 2/2 creatures and turned right-side up for an additional cost, and occasionally an additional benefit. This magic is described as being an invention of the extinct dragons, now adapted to human needs. The clans, and their khans, are as follows:

- The Abzan Houses (White, Black, Green) see endurance as the most important quality of the dragon, and use scales to show that. Their mechanic is "Outlast," which allows them to permanently strengthen their creatures through tapping. The clan is led by Anafenza, called "The Foremost," known for leading from the front.
- The Jeskai Way (Blue, Red, White) prefer the cunning nature of the dragon, and represent themselves with an eye. In Khans of Tarkir, the clan is led by Narset, the Enlightened Master who speaks of other worlds than Tarkir alone. Their mechanic is "Prowess," which gives creatures temporary bonuses every time the player casts a non-creature spell.
- The Sultai Brood (Black, Green, Blue) adopt the ruthlessness of the dragon, and use a fang as their symbol. Their mechanic is "Delve," which allows the player to lessen the mana costs of spells by permanently removing cards from their graveyard. They are led by Sidisi, Brood Tyrant, a powerful naga necromancer who considers herself queen of the clan.
- The Mardu Horde (Red, White, Black) views speed as the greatest aspect of the dragon, representing it with wings. Their mechanic is "Raid," which provides bonuses if the player attacked during their turn. In Khans of Tarkir, the clan is led by Zurgo Helmsmasher, a savage orc who has a vendetta against Sarkhan Vol.
- The Temur Frontier (Green, Blue, Red) believe in the dragon's savagery, and use the claw as their symbol. Their mechanic is "Ferocious," which provides benefits if the player controls at least one creature with a power of 4 or greater. In Khans of Tarkir, the clan is led by Surrak Dragonclaw, a mighty man renowned for punching a bear in the face.

=== Fate Reforged ===
Tarkir is the birthplace of the dragon-worshipping planeswalker Sarkhan Vol, first introduced in Shards of Alara. At the beginning of the Khans set, Sarkhan returns to Tarkir and learns that the extinction of Tarkir's dragons was linked to a specific event. Over a thousand years ago, there was an epic battle between two dragon planeswalkers: Nicol Bolas, one of the greatest manipulators in the multiverse, and Ugin the Spirit Dragon, who helped trap the Eldrazi on Zendikar. Now that the Eldrazi have arisen again, both Sarkhan and Sorin Markov have arrived on Tarkir, the last known location of Ugin, in search of his help. Discovering that Ugin is dead, Sarkhan resolves to travel back in time and save him. His travels in the Tarkir of 1,280 years ago are chronicled in the set Fate Reforged. He finds a world where the five human clans do not fight each other, instead fending off constant attacks from Tarkir's many dragons; the clans still model themselves on a particular quality of the dragon, epitomized by a Legendary Dragon creature whom each clan reveres and strives to emulate. The set focuses more on the color at the center of each wedge and its ally, with the enemy color given very little presence. The dragons who serve as the inspiration for each clan have their own watermarks, which are modified versions of the clan sigil. Additionally, the Morph mechanic is absent; instead, a mechanic which is described as being Morph's precursor, "Manifest," allows players to put any card face-down as a 2/2 creature, and flip them again only if their obverse was a creature to begin with.

- The Abzan Houses (White, Black, Green) are led by Daghatar the Adamant, an aloof and analytical leader. They revere Dromoka, the Eternal. In the past, their mechanic is "Bolster," which lets players strengthen the weakest of their creatures.
- The Jeskai Way (Blue, Red, White) are led by Shu Yun, the Silent Tempest, who seeks to preserve knowledge. They revere Ojutai, Soul of Winter. They retain the Prowess mechanic.
- The Sultai Brood (Black, Green, Blue) are led by Tasigur, the Golden Fang, an indolent and spoiled prince. They revere Silumgar, the Drifting Death. They retain the Delve mechanic.
- The Mardu Horde (Red, White, Black) are led by Alesha, Who Smiles At Death, a transgender warrior who managed to negotiate a position as equals for her clan. They revere Kolaghan, the Storm's Fury. In the past, their mechanic is "Dash," which allows players to cast creatures at reduced mana cost, but with the added corollary that the creature must return to hand at the end of the turn.
- The Temur Frontier (Green, Blue, Red) are led by Yasova Dragonclaw (all Temur khans take the title "Dragonclaw"), Sarkhan Vol's first friend in the past, who dreams of a world where the humans of Tarkir are no longer prey to dragons. They revere Atarka, World Render. They retain the Ferocious mechanic.

=== Dragons of Tarkir ===
Sarkhan Vol is successful at preventing Ugin's death, though Ugin is forced to retreat into a hibernative state to recuperate. Satisfied, Sarkhan travels back into the "present day." But the Tarkir he finds, as chronicled in Dragons of Tarkir, is drastically changed. The eponymous dragons, no longer extinct, have proliferated, and are now on the verge of wiping out all other life; in particular, the five god-dragons worshiped by the clans are now the leaders of those clans, with the human (or humanoid) characters who led them in the original timeline serving in other roles. In this new future, each of the clans focuses on allied pairs, with the enemy colors of the original wedges abandoned entirely; likewise, each clan retains the modified watermark of their dragonlords, first introduced in the previous set. Morph returns as "Megamorph"; the two mechanics are identical except that creatures with Megamorph gain a +1/+1 counter when flipped. Dragons also creates the peculiar structure of Tarkir Block drafts: Fate Reforged is designed to be drafted with either Dragons or Khans, but the two large sets, representing alternate timelines, are not intended to be drafted together. To that end, Dragons retains the two altered clan mechanics from FRF and replaces the three that remained.

- The Dromoka Brood (Green, White) is what the Abzan Houses have become. Dragonlord Dromoka leads and they retain the Bolster mechanic from Fate Reforged. Anafenza, no longer their leader, was martyred for apostatic religious beliefs, but lives on as a ghost associated with a spirit tree.
- The Ojutai Brood (Blue, White) is what the Jeskai Way have become. Dragonlord Ojutai leads them, and their mechanic, new to the Tarkir block but returning from Rise of the Eldrazi, is "Rebound," which lets spells re-occur at the beginning of the player's next turn. Narset, their former leader, has ignited her planeswalker spark, and is one of the two planeswalkers in the set (the other being an alternate version of Sarkhan Vol).
- The Silumgar Brood (Blue, Black) is what the Sultai Brood have become. Dragonlord Silumgar leads them, and their mechanic is "Exploit." When a creature with Exploit enters the battlefield, the player may sacrifice a pre-existing creature to gain extra benefits from the Exploiting creature. Their former leader, Sidisi, exists as an undead thrall to Silumgar.
- The Kolaghan Brood (Red, Black) is what the Mardu Horde have become. Dragonlord Kolaghan leads them, and they retain the Dash mechanic from Fate Reforged. Their former leader, Zurgo, has been reduced to a mere ceremonial bellringer, and is often bullied by his clan.
- The Atarka Brood (Green, Red) is what the Temur Frontier have become. Dragonlord Atarka leads them, and their mechanic is "Formidable," which provides bonuses if the player has creatures with total power 8 or higher. Surrak, their former leader, serves as the brood's Hunt Caller, in charge of feeding Atarka and renowned for punching a dragon.

Sorin Markov, arriving at the altered version of Tarkir, awakens Ugin from his hibernation. Ugin agrees to help fend off the Eldrazi, though he insists that first he and Sorin seek out Nahiri, the Lithomancer, a planeswalker who helped him seal the Eldrazi away the first time. Sarkhan, meanwhile, learns that he is the only person who remembers the version of Tarkir where he himself was born, and consultation with both Ugin and Narset reveals that, in this continuity, no Sarkhan Vol ever was born. Though both he and Narset are capable of planeswalking anywhere else in the multiverse, both decide to remain on Tarkir.

== Mechanics ==
Khans of Tarkir features a number of new mechanics as well as two returning mechanics (Morph and Delve):

- Prowess: An ability that gives the creature +1/+1 until end of turn when non-creature spells are cast by their controller. This is the Jeskai mechanic. It later became an evergreen mechanic.
- Raid: An ability that activates if a creature is summoned after creatures attack in a player's second main phase. This is the Mardu mechanic.
- Outlast: Allows players to place counters on creatures as a sorcery. This is the Abzan mechanic.
- Ferocious: Allows players to do different effects when they control a creature with power 4 or greater. This is the Temur mechanic.
- Delve: Allows players to exile cards from the graveyard to reduce casting cost, similar to how the Convoke ability uses tapped creatures. This is the Sultai mechanic. The mechanic originally appeared in Future Sight.
- Morph: Allows players to disguise the identities of their creatures by casting them face-down on the battlefield as a 2/2 colorless creature, which can be flipped up at any time by paying its morph cost. All clans can have this mechanic.

Fate Reforged features three new mechanics, with Prowess, Ferocious, and Delve returning from Khans of Tarkir.

- Bolster: An ability where players choose the creature with the least toughness that they control, and put +1/+1 counters on it for the Bolster number. This is the new Abzan mechanic.
- Dash: An ability where you may cast a spell for its Dash cost. If you do, it gains haste, and is returned to its owner's hand at the beginning of the next end step. This is the new Mardu mechanic.
- Manifest: Take the top card of your library and place it face down as a 2/2 colorless creature. If it's a creature card, you may pay its mana cost to turn it face up. All clans can have this mechanic.

Dragons of Tarkir features four new mechanics, with Bolster and Dash returning from Fate Reforged.

- Rebound: An ability to cast an additional copy of a spell during your next upkeep. This is the new Jeskai mechanic.
- Megamorph: An ability to have creatures who morph unmorph with an extra +1/+1 counter. All clans have this mechanic.
- Formidable: An ability that allows you to do something if the total of power among creatures you control is 8 or greater. This is the new Temur ability.
- Exploit: An ability that grants you an additional bonus if you sacrifice a creature upon a card with Exploit entering the battlefield.

== Differences from other blocks ==
According to Mark Rosewater, "There is something that people have been asking us to do for quite a while that we’re finally bringing back after a long absence in Magic, and there’s something that people have been asking us to do that we have never done that for the first time we’re doing in Khans of Tarkir", meaning the return of the keyword "morph" and creating a set themed around wedges, respectively. In addition, allied "fetchlands" were reprinted, after originally being seen in Onslaught.

In addition, Wizards of the Coast will be debuting a new two-set block system following the conclusion of Khans, making this the last one to have the traditional three-set system.

== Reception ==
In 2015 Khans of Tarkir won the Origins award as best Collectible Card Game of the Year.

== Notable Cards ==
Notable cards from Khans of Tarkir include Anafenza, the Foremost, Jeskai Ascendancy, Treasure Cruise, Dig Through Time, Monastery Swiftspear, and the allied coloured Fetch Lands such as Flooded Strand.

Notable cards from Fate Reforged include Ugin, the Spirit Dragon and Monastery Mentor.

Notable cards from Dragons of Tarkir include Sidisi, Undead Vizier, Atarka's Command, and Collected Company.

== See also ==
- Shards of Alara, an earlier block that focused on allied three-color combinations, the counterpart of Khans of Tarkir.
