= Tom LaPille =

- Born: August 27, 1985 (age 41)
- Occupation: Magic Developer

Tom LaPille (born August 27, 1985) is a former Magic: The Gathering developer at Wizards of the Coast. He led the development on Magic 2012, Dark Ascension, and Masters Edition III, Modern Masters 2015, and Eternal Masters. He also wrote the Dailymtg.com Development column Latest Developments for nearly four years. Mark Rosewater considers him part of the fifth generation of Magic designers.

== Biography ==
Lapille grew up in Ohio, where he attended Ohio State University.

== Career ==
=== Magic: The Gathering ===
Tom LaPille played Magic: The Gathering professionally throughout his time in college, making top 8 at Grand Prix Charlotte in 2005 and playing in four Pro Tours.

In 2007, Tom created the website http://playmagicwith.tomlapille.com with the stated goal of obtaining a job with Wizards of the Coast, the company which makes Magic: The Gathering within one year. The website and its extensive focus on the "Cube" format garnered Wizards' attention, eventually leading to his hiring within a year. Tom believes that showing Wizards how he could construct a set through his Cube design was crucial for obtaining the job, stating, "Carefully crafting a cube means taking cards as given and using them to build a coherent and fun play experience so it's about as close as you can get to actual Magic development without being able to adjust the actual cards."

While employed at Wizards of the Coast, Tom worked on Innistrad, Worldwake, Mirrodin Besieged, and Magic 2010.

Tom also wrote the Dailymtg.com weekly Column on Magic Development, Latest Developments, from January 9, 2009 through December 2, 2012, leaving to pursue more work on Dungeons & Dragons. He still writes Latest Developments on occasion.
