= Verhey =

Verhey is a surname. Notable people with the surname include:

- Emmy Verhey (born 1949), Dutch violinist
- Gavin Verhey (born 1990), American game developer
