= Magic: The Gathering compilation sets =

The collectible card game Magic: The Gathering has released compilation sets, reprint sets, and box sets over its history. These are distinct from core sets and expansion sets, the most heavily marketed sources of new cards. With the exception of Chronicles, reprint sets generally do not affect tournament legality in supported formats; for example, cards reprinted in the Modern Masters reprint set, while legal for tournament play, did not necessarily cause the card to be included in the "Standard" environment. (If a card happened to be in Standard due to a separate reprinting, though, all "versions" of the card automatically become legal, including ones from a reprint set.)

These sets tend to be of two types: sets with a fixed deck buyers receive, and sets sold in randomized booster packs, similar to "normal" expansion sets, but only consisting of reprint cards. Chronicles, Premium Foil Booster, and sets of the Masters brand are printed in randomized boosters; others have a fixed card set.

== Chronicles ==
Chronicles was the first compilation set of Magic: The Gathering, released in July 1995. Unlike many later compilation sets, Chronicles was treated like a normal expansion set, including renewing tournament legality for cards reprinted in it. For tournament play, Chronicles was designated as an extension of the Fourth Edition base set. Chronicles reprinted cards from Arabian Nights, Antiquities, Legends, and The Dark. Wizards of the Coast released a similar set called Renaissance into the German, French and Italian markets.

== Masters ==
Modern Masters
- Released: June 7, 2013
- Size: 229 cards (101 commons, 60 uncommons, 53 rares, 15 mythic rares)
- Development code: Picasso
- Expansion code: MMA
← Dragon's Maze	Magic 2014 →

Modern Masters 2015 Edition
- Released: May 22, 2015
- Size: 249 cards (101 commons, 80 uncommons, 53 rares, 15 mythic rares)
- Expansion code: MM2
← Dragons of Tarkir	Magic Origins →

Masters is a series of Magic: The Gathering compilation sets. The "original" Masters Editions were Magic: The Gathering Online (MTGO) exclusive sets designed to put old cards created before the release of MTGO into circulation. Masters became an official printed series in 2013 with the release of Modern Masters.

The paper Masters series consists of:

- Modern Masters, released in 2013
- Modern Masters 2015 Edition
- Eternal Masters, released in 2016
- Modern Masters 2017 Edition
- Iconic Masters, released in 2017
- Masters 25, released in 2018
- Ultimate Masters, released in 2018
- Double Masters, released in 2020

Booster boxes of the Masters series generally contain only 24 booster packs, compared to a regular expansion containing 36 packs, with the intent that they be used for an 8-player Limited draft. Basic Lands, which are present in most expansion set booster packs, are absent in the Masters sets. Instead, a premium card (foil), which traditionally existed in a common card slot on random basis, is included in every pack.

Modern Masters is a set that consists of reprints of cards which are legal in the Modern format. Modern includes all cards from Eighth Edition onwards, barring a small number of banned cards. The first Modern Masters ("MMA") was released on June 7, 2013. It has 229 cards (101 commons, 60 uncommons, 53 rares, and 15 mythic rares) ranging from Eighth Edition through Alara Reborn. The set was released in the English language only. The original Modern Masters distribution was highly limited and Wizards of the Coast stated they would not like to release as much as they did with Chronicles. Wizards of the Coast eventually loosened this, and printed considerably more of the 2015 and 2017 editions of Modern Masters. Notable reprints in the original Modern Masters included Dark Confidant, Tarmogoyf, and Vendilion Clique.

The second set, Modern Masters 2015 Edition ("MM2"), was released May 22, 2015. It has 249 cards (101 commons, 80 uncommons, 53 rares, and 15 mythic rares). In addition to the blocks in the original Modern Masters, the 2015 edition features cards from Zendikar block, Scars of Mirrodin block, Magic 2010, Magic 2011, and Magic 2012. The set was released in Japanese and Simplified Chinese in addition to English. Twenty to thirty cards feature new artwork, and a number of new tokens are included. The English booster pack in Modern Masters 2015 Edition used recyclable paper cardboard as packaging material instead of foil packs, the first set doing so in Magic history. It also raised some complaints of easier theft of the cards, however. Notable reprints in Modern Masters 2015 Edition included Bitterblossom, Emrakul, the Aeons Torn, and Karn Liberated.

Eternal Masters is a Magic compilation set released in June 2016. Similar to the Modern Masters sets, it reprints cards, but from all of Magic's history rather than restricting itself to the Modern format, thus aiming itself at casual formats such as Cube as well as the Vintage and Legacy formats.

Modern Masters 2017 Edition ("MM3") was released on March 17, 2017. It was also released in English, Simplified Chinese, and Japanese. The 2017 edition added Innistrad block, Return to Ravnica block, Magic 2013, and Magic 2014 to the sets eligible for a Modern Masters reprint. Notable reprints in Modern Masters 2017 Edition included Tarmogoyf, Damnation, Liliana of the Veil, Snapcaster Mage, Voice of Resurgence, and the enemy color "fetchlands" such as Scalding Tarn.

Iconic Masters is a Magic compilation set; it was released at Hasbro's HasCon's 25th anniversary celebration of Magic in September 2017, and released to the wider public in November 2017. It is a compilation set with reprinted cards originating throughout the history of Magic, similar to Eternal Masters. The set is generally perceived to have had poor sales due to the two month delayed nature of its wide release, which happened only a few weeks before the release of Unstable. Wizards of the Coast would later apologize for setting wrong expectations for the set as well as the strange scheduling after receiving negative feedback about the set.

Masters 25 (A25) was released on March 16, 2018. It was themed as a celebration of 25 years of the history of Magic, with cards from every printed set.

Ultimate Masters (UMA) was released on December 7, 2018. In the set's official announcement, it was noted that it would have an unusually high price point, but would contain unusually high-value reprints. It is the first Magic set to include a regular-sized "box topper" promotional card with each booster box. Wizards of the Coast announced that it would be the last Masters set for some time; however, Double Masters would be released less than two years later.

Double Masters (2XM) was released on August 7, 2020. Due to the "double" theme of the set, each draft booster contains two rare or mythic cards and two foil cards of any rarity, and each booster box contains two "box topper" promotional cards. It is the first Masters set to be released without an official list price.

== Anthologies ==
Anthologies
- Released: November 1998
- Expansion code: ATH
← Urza's Saga	Urza's Legacy →

Anthologies was a box set and the second compilation set. It was printed in November 1998 to celebrate the 5th anniversary of Magic. It featured cards from Alpha through Urza's Saga. The print run was unknown.

Unlike Chronicles, but like other box sets such as Battle Royale, the reprinted cards did not count as current product, and thus were only legal in formats which allowed the original cards being reprinted to be used, and were not automatically legal in Standard at the time the product was available.

Anthologies had two decks: "Dark Alliance", a black/red "aggressive deck" with goblins; and "Defenders of the Cause", a green/white control deck. It was printed with and without expansion symbols. The cards had white borders and standard backs.

The Anthologies cards with identical copies in 5th Edition (e.g. Armageddon, Nevinyrral's Disk, etc.) bear a striking resemblance to those from 5th Edition and can be difficult to differentiate. They can be told apart by looking at the copyright line: 5th Edition cards have "© 1997", whereas the Anthologies reprints have "© 1993-1998", which became the new standard for the copyright line with the release of Exodus.

The reviewer from the online second volume of Pyramid stated that "For latecomers to the game, this is a great way to get a taste of some cards from supplements long ago out of print and snapped up by the collectors."

== Battle Royale ==
Battle Royale
- Released: November 1999
- Size: 160 (136 unique) cards
- Keywords: None new
- Mechanics: Compilation
- Expansion code: BRY
← Mercadian Masques	Nemesis →

Battle Royale was a Magic: The Gathering boxed set, the third compilation set, released in November 1999 as a collection of cards emphasizing the multiplayer aspect of the game. Most of the cards included are ones that can affect multiple opponents. This promotion included cards from all different sets that existed previous to it. The cards still retained their original expansion symbols although they were printed with white borders, which was the standard for reprinted Magic: The Gathering cards of "core sets" until the 2007 release of Tenth Edition. These are the only sets that are printed with white borders (which started with Unlimited.) Another interesting aspect is that colored expansions symbols were added to the cards that didn’t have them previously (namely cards from Tempest, Portal: Second Age, Stronghold and Ice Age.)

The set included 160 cards built into four different two-color theme decks which are 40 cards each: Spirit Gale (blue / white), Chargoyf (green / red), The Deluge (green / white), and Cinder Heart (black / red).

== Beatdown ==
Beatdown
- mace
- Released: October 2000
- Size: 122 cards, 4 of them with alternate art
- Expansion code: BTD
← Invasion	Planeshift →

Beatdown is a box set for Magic: The Gathering, and the fourth compilation set. It was not legal in Standard at the time of its release. Beatdown was released as a pair of preconstructed decks combined with accessories, unlike the normal distribution of Magic cards in randomized packs. Alternate art was done for four cards: Sengir Vampire, Erhnam Djinn, Ball Lightning, and Clockwork Beast. The set is white-bordered, and the expansion symbol is a mace. There are no White cards in the set.

The set includes 122 special edition Magic cards divided into two theme decks, Aerodoom and Ground Pounder. The focus of the two decks in the Beatdown box set is to overwhelm your opponent with decks that included some of the more powerful creatures in the game, to that date, such as the aforementioned Erhnam Djinn, Sengir Vampire, Ball Lightning and Clockwork Beast. The Beatdown set was released in October 2000.

Clockwork Avian was misprinted without flying in Beatdown.

== From the Vault ==
From the Vault is a series of limited-edition Magic: The Gathering boxed sets. Each set consists mostly of cards released in previous Magic: The Gathering expansions, but in foil and sometimes with new artwork. Some From the Vault decks contain a pre-release of a card due to be released in the next Magic: The Gathering expansion. Typically, the boxed set also contains a 20-sided spin-down life counter die in addition to the cards. Because From the Vault releases are not normal expansion sets, the tournament-legality of the cards depends on the most recent normal expansion they were printed in.

In February 2018, it was announced that the From the Vault series would be cancelled and spiritually succeeded by the Signature Spellbook series. The following is a list of all the From the Vault sets:

- From the Vault: Dragons was released August 29, 2008. It contained 15 cards, all of which were Dragons or Dragon-related, and one of which was a pre-release of a card in the Shards of Alara set. 7 of the cards had new artwork (counting the pre-release).
- From the Vault: Exiled was released August 28, 2009. It contained 15 cards, all of which are or were banned or restricted in at least one format. 8 of the cards had new artwork.
- From the Vault: Relics was released August 27, 2010. It contained 15 cards, all of which were artifacts, and one of which was a pre-release of a card in the Scars of Mirrodin set. 11 of the cards had new artwork (counting the pre-release).
- From the Vault: Legends was released August 26, 2011. It contained 15 cards, all of which were legendary creatures, and one of which was a pre-release of a card in the Innistrad set. 8 of the cards had new artwork (counting the pre-release).
- From the Vault: Realms: was released on August 31, 2012. It contained 15 cards, all of which were lands. 7 of the cards had new artwork.
- From the Vault: Twenty was released on August 23, 2013. It contained 20 cards, each of which represented a year in Magic's history, in commemoration of Magic's 20th anniversary. 9 of the cards had new artwork.
- From the Vault: Annihilation was released on August 22, 2014. It contains 15 cards, with a "sweep the battlefield" theme. 6 of the cards have new artwork.
- From the Vault: Angels was released on August 21, 2015. It contains 15 cards, all of which were angel themed (14 creatures, 1 sorcery), with five of them having new artwork.
- From the Vault: Lore was released on August 19, 2016. It contains 15 cards, all of which showcased important moments in Magic's story.
- From the Vault: Transform was released on November 24, 2017. It contains 15 cards, all of which are double faced.

== Premium Deck Series ==
Premium Deck Series was a set of preconstructed 60-card Magic: The Gathering decks. All cards were foil and were reprints of cards first printed in other Magic sets. All of the cards are black bordered and tournament legal in their original formats.

There have been three Premium Deck Series printed:

- Premium Deck Series: Slivers was released November 20, 2009. All creatures in this deck were of the Sliver subtype (including the mythic-rare Sliver Overlord).
- Premium Deck Series: Fire & Lightning was released November 19, 2010. The set was mono-red and revolved around Elemental creatures and various red spells that dealt direct damage to creatures or opponents.
- Premium Deck Series: Graveborn was released November 18, 2011. The set revolved around cards that deal with the graveyard.

In July 2012 at San Diego Comic-Con, Wizards of the Coast announced that the Premium Deck Series would be discontinued after Graveborn.

== Duel Decks ==
Duel Decks are a series of boxed sets for Magic: The Gathering, each consisting of a pair of 60-card decks built around a rivalry between two forces, often planeswalkers or creature type "tribes". Typically, each deck contains a mythic rare, several rares, and a number of cards with alternate art. Most cards are reprints of cards from previous sets; however, some duel decks contain pre-release cards from unreleased future sets.

Release date	Code	Name	t	b	c	u	r	m	notes
2007-11-16	EVG	Elves vs. Goblins	3				8		Green elves vs. red goblins.
2008-11-07	DD2	Jace vs. Chandra	3				6	2	Blue Jace Beleren vs. red Chandra Nalaar.
2009-04-10	DDC	Divine vs. Demonic	3				8	2	White angels vs. black demons.
2009-10-20	DDD	Garruk vs. Liliana	3				6	2	Green Garruk Wildspeaker vs. black Liliana Vess.
2010-03-19	DDE	Phyrexia vs. The Coalition					10	2	Black Phyrexia vs. five-color coalition.
2010-09-03	DDF	Elspeth vs. Tezzeret					10	2	White Elspeth, Knight-Errant vs. blue-artifact Tezzeret the Seeker, 2 Scars of Mirrodin previews.
2011-04-01	DDG	Knights vs. Dragons					10	2	White-green knights vs red dragons.
2011-09-02	DDH	Ajani vs. Nicol Bolas					10	2	White-green-red Ajani Vengeant vs. blue-black-red Nicol Bolas, Planeswalker.
2012-03-30	DDI	Venser vs. Koth					10	2	Blue-white Venser, the Sojourner vs. red Koth of the Hammer.
2012-09-07	DDJ	Izzet vs. Golgari		37	38	33	10	2	Red-blue Ravnica's Izzet League vs. black-green Ravnica's Golgari Swarm, 6 Return to Ravnica pre-releases.
2013-03-15	DDK	Sorin vs. Tibalt		41	32	35	10	2	Black-white Sorin, Lord of Innistrad vs. red-black Tibalt, the Fiend-Blooded.
2013-09-06	DDL	Heroes vs. Monsters		41	35	32	10	2	White-red humans and auras vs. green-red large trampling creatures, 6 Theros pre-releases.
2014-03-14	DDM	Jace vs. Vraska	3	41	42	25	10	2	Blue Jace, Architect of Thought vs. black-green Vraska the Unseen.
2014-09-05	DDN	Speed vs. Cunning	2	39	42	27	10	2	Red-white-black Zurgo Helmsmasher vs. red-white-blue Arcanis the Omnipotent, 6 Khans of Tarkir pre-releases.
2014-12-05	DD3	Anthology	35				28	6	A reprint of the first four releases.
2015-02-27	DDO	Elspeth vs. Kiora	2	44	50	14	10	2	White Elspeth, Sun's Champion vs. green-blue Kiora, the Crashing Wave.
2015-08-28	DDP	Zendikar vs. Eldrazi	10	39			10	2	Green-white Zendikar vs. black-red Eldrazi, 6 Battle for Zendikar pre-releases.
2016-02-26	DDQ	Blessed vs. Cursed							White-blue Blessed vs.black-blue Cursed, 6 Shadows over Innistrad pre-releases.
2016-09-02	DDR	Nissa vs. Ob Nixilis							Green Nissa, Voice of Zendikar vs. Black Ob Nixilis, Reignited
2017-03-31	DDS	Mind vs. Might							Blue-red mages vs. green-red warriors
2017-11-10	DDT	Merfolk vs. Goblins							Blue merfolks vs. red goblins
2018-04-06	DDU	Elves vs. Inventors							Green elves vs. red-blue inventors

== Other ==
- Deckmasters: Garfield vs. Finkel, usually known as simply Deckmasters, was a set released in 2001 featuring copies of the decks used in a promotional match between Richard Garfield, the creator of the card game, and Jon Finkel, a Magic World Champion. Two decks were included in the set, a red/green deck used by Richard Garfield, and a red/black deck that was played by Finkel. It is the fifth compilation set. The match from which the decks are taken was held in January 2002. About a year before, Wizards of the Coast challenged Garfield and Finkel to build a deck out of Ice Age and Alliances cards to compete against each other with. They were given very strict criteria to build these decks, such as that each deck could only use four rare cards and no more than two copies of any one card. Some cards were banned for the purpose of this event such as Kjeldoran Outpost. Finkel won match one because Garfield misplayed the current timing rules at least twice during the course of the game. Garfield joked, "Shouldn't we be playing by the rules as I made them?" In the second match, Garfield was defeated by lack of mana. "This is the first time I am sitting up here and am honestly unhappy that my opponent is manascrewed," Finkel confessed.
- Premium Foil Booster was released by Wizards of the Coast in 2010. It was sold as booster packs which contained a randomized collection of 15 cards from Alara block, except all guaranteed to be foiled. All 539 cards printed in Shards of Alara, Conflux, and Alara Reborn were potentially included.
