= Theros Block =

Magic: The Gathering expansion block

Theros
- Released: September 27, 2013
- Size: 249 cards (15 Mythic Rare, 53 Rare, 60 Uncommon, 101 Common, 20 Basic Land)
- Designers: Mark Rosewater (lead), Ethan Fleischer, Ken Nagle, Zac Hill, and Jenna Helland
- Developers: Erik Lauer (lead), Zac Hill, David Humpherys, Doug Beyer, Shawn Main, and Tom LaPille
- Development code: Friends
- Expansion code: THS

First set in the Theros block
Theros	Born of the Gods	Journey Into Nyx
← Magic 2014	Born of the Gods →
← Return to Ravnica Block	Khans Block →

Born of the Gods
- Released: February 7, 2014
- Size: 165 cards (10 mythic rare, 35 rare, 60 uncommon, 60 common)
- Designers: Ken Nagle (lead), Ethan Fleischer, Billy Moreno, Mark Rosewater, Ryan Spain
- Developers: Tom LaPille (lead), Chris Dupris, Mark Gottlieb, David Humpherys, Billy Moreno, Matt Tabak
- Development code: Romans
- Expansion code: BNG

Second set in the Theros block
Theros	Born of the Gods	Journey Into Nyx
← Theros	Journey Into Nyx →
← Return to Ravnica Block	Khans Block →

Journey Into Nyx
- Released: May 2, 2014
- Size: 165 cards (10 mythic rare, 35 rare, 60 uncommon, 60 common)
- Designers: Ethan Fleischer (lead), Dan Emmons, Eric Lauer, Matt Tabak, and Mark Rosewater
- Developers: Dave Humpherys (lead), Ian Duke, Tom Jenkot, Eric Lauer, and Ken Nagle
- Development code: Countrymen
- Expansion code: JOU

Third set in the Theros block
Theros	Born of the Gods	Journey Into Nyx
← Born of the Gods	Conspiracy →
← Return to Ravnica Block	Khans Block →

Theros is a set of three expansions to the Magic: The Gathering game, consisting of the sets Theros (September 27, 2013), Born of the Gods (February 7, 2014) and Journey into Nyx (May 2, 2014). The setting was later used for a Dungeons & Dragons sourcebook, Mythic Odysseys of Theros (2020). The lore and aesthetics of the game setting was based on Greek mythology.

== Synopsis ==
=== Setting ===
Nyx is depicted as the land of night and home of the gods as believed by the inhabitants of Theros. As a result, dreams are believed to be messages from the gods. When the likenesses of the gods appear in the night sky, it's as though the gods are inhabiting both the mortal and spiritual world at the same time. Enchantments are gifts from the gods, and the gods themselves are Living Enchantments. Each color has its own god: Heliod, God of the Sun (white), Thassa, Goddess of the Sea (blue), Erebos, God of the Dead (black), Purphoros, God of the Forge (red), and Nylea, Goddess of the Hunt (green). Each god also has their own signature weapon that shows up as a legendary artifact enchantment. The pantheon is rounded out by ten lesser gods, one for each combination of two colors: Athreos, God of Passage (a white/black psychopomp), Ephara, Goddess of the Polis (white/blue), Iroas, God of Victory (white/red) and his twin Mogis, God of Slaughter (black/red), Karametra, Goddess of Harvests (white/green), Keranos, God of Storms (blue/red), Kruphix, God of Horizons (blue/green), Pharika, Goddess of Affliction (black/green), Phenax, God of Deception (blue/black), and Xenagos, the newly ascended God of Revels (red/green).

There are three major cities, each known as the poleis (singular "polis"). They are Meletis, city of learning, magic, and progress sitting on the coast surrounded by rivers and grassland; Akros, city of die-hard warriors surrounded by mountains that restrict contact with the rest of the plane; and Setessa, a city close to nature that puts a lot of emphasis on families.

Theros is a "top-down" design, meaning that its Design, Development and Creative teams consciously modeled the set on Greek mythology and its tropes; this is opposed to a bottom-up design, where the designers start with a gameplay experience and then layer a story on top of it. As such, many cards allude to famous myths: Akroan Horse to the Trojan Horse, Chained to the Rocks to the fate of Prometheus, Rescue from the Underworld to the tale of Orpheus and Eurydice, Labyrinth Champion to Theseus, and more. To quote Head Designer Mark Rosewater: "Here's a theme you're going to hear again and again. 'We were doing a Greek mythology set so we had to do X.'"

=== Plot ===
The block's main protagonist is Elspeth Tirel, a White-wielding human planeswalker first introduced as a member of her adopted homeworld Bant in Shards of Alara, whose travels have brought her to Theros. It is actually not her first visit; some time in the past she had sojourned briefly there, witnessing a clash between Heliod and Purphoros and absconding with a sword that was dropped during the tumult. This sword, Godsend, was the property of Heliod, and when she returned to Theros he attempted to reclaim it by force. Of course, as a planeswalker, her magical powers were sufficient to resist him. Insecure in his powers, he transformed the sword into a spear and tasked Elspeth with traveling to his temple in Meletis. On her journey, she encountered Polukranos, World Eater, a giant hydra who had been released during the initial conflict between Heliod and Purphoros and which had terrorized the countryside ever since. By putting an end to this menace, she earned the approbation of Heliod and was declared Elspeth, Sun's Champion.

The block's primary antagonist is Xenagos, The Reveler. Once a satyr hedonist in the Skola Valley, his planeswalking turned him to nihilism, infusing him with the realization that, in the grand scheme of things, he mattered little and less. After returning to Theros, he decided to ascend to the Theran pantheon. To do this, he spread lies and rumors about Godsend, so that Elspeth was beset by many of the Theran gods during her journey to Meletis. He then gathered an army of savage creatures and attacked the city of Akros, forcing Elspeth to lead a hasty defense. Despite desperate odds, the Sun's Champion prevailed, and the city of Akros was consumed in celebration. Unbeknownst to all, though, the bacchanalia was the final ingredient Xenagos needed to deify himself. Ascended, he became Xenagos, God of Revels. Heliod, his wrath awakened by the undermining of the sacred Pantheon, blames Elspeth for Xenagos’s ascension and seeks to kill her. Elspeth is forced to flee into the wilderness, where she finds fellow planeswalker Ajani Goldmane and enlists his help. Ajani, who feels he owes a debt to Elspeth for her help on his home plane of Alara during the great Conflux, agrees to journey with Elspeth into the starry underworld of Nyx, where legend has it that somewhere hidden deep is the secret to killing a god.

Elspeth and Ajani find the temple of Kruphix, God of Horizons, thanks to the timely assistance of the mysterious merfolk planeswalker Kiora, the Crashing Wave, who is often mistaken for Thassa, God of the Sea. Kruphix grants them passage into Nyx, but Elspeth must first undergo an ordeal of one of the gods of her choosing. She selects Erebos, and the God of the Dead tempts her with a vision of a peaceful home – something she has sought after all her life – with the stipulation that she must lay down her sword and give up the fight against Xenagos. Elspeth refuses Erebos’s offer and presses on into Nyx. Elspeth and Ajani join the ongoing battle between the dark Returned that dwell in the underworld and the celestial beings that Xenagos has trapped there. Elspeth battles fiercely with Xenagos and finally succeeds in striking him down with Godsend, the god-forged weapon of Heliod, finishing the God of Revels off for good.

Despite Elspeth’s heroic efforts to undo the devastation that Xenagos wreaked on the plane, Heliod does not forgive her for enabling the satyr to ascend in the first place. He stops Elspeth and Ajani as they flee from Nyx and strikes Elspeth down with her own weapon. Heliod orders Ajani to bear Elspeth back to the mortal realm to die, where she may be taken away by Erebos to the Underworld. The storyline of Theros concludes as Ajani leaves Elspeth and is hurried away by his leonin kin back into the wilderness, and Erebos claims the Sun's Champion for his own at last.

While the main plot of the block unfolds, Ashiok, a hitherto unseen Planeswalker distinguished by their ability to control dreams and the replacement of their head from the nose up by a pair of smoking, curled horns, engages in a campaign of terror amongst the poleis of Theros. With the aid of a glamour from Phenax, the god of deception, Ashiok goes unseen across the city-states of the plane infiltrating the dreams of its inhabitants. Eventually, they succeed in their goal: raising a new god, Cacophony, God of Cities. Cacophony appears to briefly attack the inhabitants of an unknown city, before Ephara, God of the Polis, notices it and destroys it, promising to find the mortal who created it. Regardless, Ashiok considers the experiment successful.

== Set details ==
=== Theros ===
The first set of the block, Theros, was released on September 27, 2013. This large set consists of 249 cards, three of which are Planeswalkers: The white Elspeth, Sun's Champion; the blue/black Ashiok, Nightmare Weaver; and the red/green Xenagos, the Reveler. The set contains five of the block's ten "scry lands," a cycle of dual lands that come into play tapped and allow its controller to Scry 1 when it enters the battlefield. This set also contained a notable reprint in Thoughtseize, previously seen in Lorwyn.

The block introduced several new mechanics and keywords, as well one returning keyword. The following mechanics appear in all sets of the Theros block:

- Enchantment Creature and Enchantment Artifact: Cards that are affected by anything that affects enchantments and anything that affects their other type. In addition to having the Enchantment type printed, they are also distinguished by a new starry background representing Nyx.
- Heroic: A keyword ability that appears only on creatures. Whenever a creature with Heroic becomes the target of a spell cast by its controller, the ability triggers, causing a one-time effect such as the addition of a specific number of +1/+1 counters or an action that interacts with the opponent's creatures.
- Bestow: Bestow is an alternate cost that appears only on Enchantment Creatures. A Bestow creature can be cast for its normal mana cost, or, if cast for its Bestow cost (always more expensive than the converted mana cost), it becomes an Enchantment - Aura spell with Enchant Creature. When attached to a creature, the Bestow card gives the enchanted creature a boost in power and toughness that is equal to the original power and toughness of the Bestow creature, as well as whatever additional abilities and keywords the original had (Flying, Deathtouch, etc.). Whenever the enchanted creature leaves the battlefield, the Bestow card becomes unattached from it and becomes a creature itself.
- Devotion: An ability word that checks the number of colored mana symbols among all permanents you control (not including lands) that you have in play. For example, one of the most popular devotion cards of the set, Gray Merchant of Asphodel, has an enters-the-battlefield ability that causes your opponents to lose life, and you to gain life, equal to your devotion to black. Additionally, Theros's pantheon are all played as Enchantments, only becoming creatures if your devotion to their colors has passed a certain threshold.
- Scry: A popular keyword that appeared as recently as the Magic 2011 core set, Scry allows players to look at a specified number of cards on top of their library, and choose to put those cards on the top or bottom of their library in the order they choose.

The set also has a unique mechanic that did not appear in Born of the Gods but appears in Journey into Nyx:

- Monstrous: an activated ability of creatures that can only be used once per game. When a creature's Monstrous ability is activated, it gains a specified number of +1/+1 counters. Additionally, becoming Monstrous may cause one-time effects on the game state, such as destroying lands or other creatures.

=== Born of the Gods ===
The second set of the block, Born of the Gods, was released on February 7, 2014. Born of the Gods is a small set consisting of 165 cards; of those, one is a planeswalker, the blue/green Kiora, the Crashing Wave. The set also introduces the ten "demigods" of Theros's pantheon, which are dual-colored and care about their controller's devotion to two colors. Born of the Gods features five of them with allied-color combinations; Journey Into Nyx will feature the remaining five.

In addition to the block-wide mechanics, Born of the Gods features two unique mechanics:

- Inspired: a triggered ability that occurs whenever an Inspired creature becomes untapped. When an Inspired ability triggers, it provides additional bonuses such as drawing a card; occasionally, it may require additional costs to be paid.
- Tribute: an enters-the-battlefield ability of creatures, replacing Monstrous and intending to evoke a similar flavor. However, it occurs only when the creature comes into play. At this time, an opponent may choose to give the Tribute creature a certain number of +1/+1 counters. If no opponent chooses to do this, the Tribute creature has a separate effect on the game state, such as spawning token creatures or causing the player to gain life.

In addition to more enchantment creatures, Born of the Gods also introduces cards that can create enchantment creature tokens; these tokens are also printed with the starry Nyx background.

=== Journey into Nyx ===
The third set of the block, Journey into Nyx, was released on May 2, 2014. It is a small set consisting of 165 cards. The set completed the cycle of ten dual-colored "demigod" cards that debuted in Born of the Gods, as well as the cycle of ten "scry lands" that premiered in the first set of Theros. The set also includes the first green/white Planeswalker, "Ajani, Mentor of Heroes." It was the last standard-legal set to be printed with the pre-M15 card frame.

In addition to the block-wide mechanics, Journey Into Nyx features two new mechanics.

- Constellation: This ability triggers whenever an enchantment enters the battlefield under your control, providing whatever bonus is specified on the card. To make room for it, Bestow and Devotion have both been scaled back, appearing on only five cards each; per Mark Rosewater, the dilution of those mechanics also represents the storyline's conflict between gods and mortals, and the latter's disillusionment with the former.
- Strive: this ability only appears on Instant and Sorcery spells that have targeting effects. Strive cards can have "any number" of targets, but the caster must pay an additional specified cost for each target beyond the first.
- The Monstrous ability returns, last seen in the first set of Theros, replacing Born of the Gods' Tribute.

== Use in Dungeons & Dragons ==
Theros was adapted as a campaign setting for the 5th edition of Dungeons & Dragons with the publication of the sourcebook Mythic Odysseys of Theros in 2020. It was the second Magic setting adapted to D&D, after the release of Guildmasters' Guide to Ravnica in 2018.
