= Shadows over Innistrad =

Block of expansion sets in Magic: The Gathering

- Avacyn's collar upside down
- Released: April 2, 2016
- Size: 297 cards
- Mechanics: Madness, Delirium, Investigate, Transform, Skulk
- Designers: Mark Gottlieb (lead), Mark Rosewater, Ken Nagle, Gavin Verhey, Sam Stoddard, Andrew Veen, Adam Lee
- Developers: Dave Humpherys (lead), Tim Aten, Ethan Fleischer, Erik Lauer, Ari Levitch, Sam Stoddard, with contributions from Matt Tabak
- Development code: Tears
- Expansion code: SOI

First set in the Shadows over Innistrad block
Shadows over Innistrad	Eldritch Moon
← Oath of the Gatewatch	Eldritch Moon →
← Battle for Zendikar block	Kaladesh block →

Eldritch Moon
- Silhouette of Emrakul
- Released: July 22, 2016
- Size: 205 Cards
- Keywords: Emerge, Escalate, Meld, Madness, Delirium, Skulk
- Development code: Fears
- Expansion code: EMN

Second set in the Shadows over Innistrad block
Shadows over Innistrad	Eldritch Moon
← Shadows over Innistrad	Kaladesh →
← Battle for Zendikar block	Kaladesh block →

Shadows over Innistrad is a Magic: The Gathering expansion block consisting of the sets Shadows over Innistrad and Eldritch Moon.

== Mechanics ==
Shadows over Innistrad has five main mechanics:

- Madness: a returning mechanic from Torment that allows a player to cast a card for its madness cost instead of being discarded. This is shown on the card Fiery Temper.
- Delirium: counts the number of different card types in a player's graveyard. If that player has four or more card types among cards in their graveyard (e.g. creature, instant, sorcery, land), delirium will grant specific effects or bonuses, like the card Soul Swallower.
- Investigate: a keyword that creates a Clue artifact token that you may pay 2 generic mana and sacrifice to draw a card, as seen on cards like Tireless Tracker.
- Transform: a returning mechanic from original Innistrad, allowing the card to "transform" to its back side if certain conditions are met, such as the card Westvale Abbey.
- Skulk: an evasion ability that appears on creature cards meaning that they can't be blocked by creatures with greater power, such as Rancid Rats.

Eldritch Moon features four returning mechanics from Shadows over Innistrad (all but Investigate) while introducing three new mechanics:

- Meld: causes two separate creature cards to transform and combine into a single creature when certain conditions are met, creating an oversized card. Two such creatures that can Meld together are Bruna, the Fading Light and Gisela, the Broken Blade.
- Escalate: An ability appearing on modal instant and sorcery spells. Paying the escalate cost allows the player to use additional modes of that spell, such as on Collective Effort.
- Emerge: An ability appearing on powerful Eldrazi creature cards such as Elder Deep-Fiend, allowing players to pay an alternate mana cost by sacrificing a creature and paying the difference between the Emerge cost and the sacrificed creature's converted mana cost.

== Storyline ==
The denizens of Innistrad are beset on all sides. Their faith in the archangel Avacyn brought them strength when fighting against demons, werewolves, vampires, and all manners of horrors. But, now the mighty protector of the plane has been twisted into something monstrous by an outside influence. A very familiar force has stepped into the gothic world, and its corrupting tendrils now touch everything.

== Trivia ==
- The "Shadows over Innistrad" block contains minor references to H. P. Lovecraft's The Shadow over Innsmouth. "Shadows over Innistrad" tells the story of the planeswalker Jace Beleren investigating the source of madness affecting the residents of Innistrad and their angelic protectors. The source is revealed to be Emrakul, one of a race of ancient beings called Eldrazi, who draw heavy influence from Lovecraft. In addition to inducing madness, Emrakul's influence warps the physiology of living beings in her vicinity, giving them a distinctive "look" of latticed flesh, additional appendages, and other strange mutations, similar to the story of The Shadow over Innsmouth and its follow-up anthology "Shadows over Innsmouth".
