= Innistrad =

Block of expansion sets in Magic: The Gathering

- Two backwards-facing herons
- Released: September 30, 2011
- Size: 264 cards (16 Mythic Rare, 59 Rare, 67 Uncommon, 107 Common, 15 Basic Land)
- Mechanics: Curse, Fight, Flashback, Morbid, Transform
- Designers: Mark Rosewater (lead), Richard Garfield, Jenna Helland, Graeme Hopkins, Tom LaPille
- Developers: Erik Lauer (lead), Mark L. Gottlieb, David Humpherys, Tom LaPille, Adam Lee, Kenneth Nagle
- Development code: Shake
- Expansion code: ISD

First set in the Innistrad block
Innistrad	Dark Ascension	Avacyn Restored
← Magic 2012	Dark Ascension →
← Scars of Mirrodin Block	Return to Ravnica Block →

Dark Ascension
- The Innistrad symbol turned inside out
- Released: February 3, 2012
- Size: 158 cards (12 Mythic Rare, 38 Rare, 44 Uncommon, 64 Common, 0 Basic Land)
- Mechanics: Undying, Fateful Hour, Morbid, Flashback, Transform
- Designers: Mark Rosewater (lead), Jenna Helland, Zac Hill, Graeme Hopkins, Matt Tabak
- Developers: Tom LaPille (lead), Mark L. Gottlieb, Zac Hill, David Humpherys, Ken Troop
- Development code: Rattle
- Expansion code: DKA

Second set in the Innistrad block
Innistrad	Dark Ascension	Avacyn Restored
← Innistrad	Avacyn Restored →
← Scars of Mirrodin Block	Return to Ravnica Block →

Avacyn Restored
- Avacyn's Collar
- Released: May 4, 2012
- Size: 244 cards (15 Mythic Rare, 53 Rare, 60 Uncommon, 101 Common, 15 Basic Land)
- Mechanics: Undying, Soulbond, Miracle
- Designers: Brian Tinsman (lead), Mark L. Gottlieb, Dave Guskin, Kenneth Nagle, Bill Rose, Mark Rosewater
- Developers: David Humpherys (lead), Mark Globus, Dave Guskin, Erik Lauer, Billy Moreno, Matt Sernett
- Development code: Roll
- Expansion code: AVR

Third set in the Innistrad block
Innistrad	Dark Ascension	Avacyn Restored
← Dark Ascension	Magic 2013 →
← Scars of Mirrodin Block	Return to Ravnica Block →

The Innistrad block is a block of the collectible card game Magic: The Gathering, consisting of the expansion sets Innistrad (September 30, 2011), Dark Ascension (February 3, 2012) and Avacyn Restored (May 4, 2012). Innistrad is a "top-down" designed block based on Gothic horror. The set's mechanics and effects take mainly graveyard themes, with a minor focus on tribal themes. The tagline for the set is "Horror Lurks Within". It has 264 cards.

Magic returned to the plane of Innistrad in 2016 with the Shadows Over Innistrad block, consisting of Shadows Over Innistrad and Eldritch Moon. This article deals with the original Innistrad block.

== Design and development ==
=== Innistrad ===
According to Magic lead designer Mark Rosewater, "The number-one role of this set's design was capturing the feel of the horror genre." Monsters were one of the first tropes explored which led to the tribal component of the set.

=== Dark Ascension ===
Dark Ascension was first revealed at the 2011 Comic-Con in San Diego, California. Just like Worldwake, Dark Ascension is a small set in between two large sets. Dark Ascension boosters always contain a double-faced card of any rarity to replace one of the commons in the pack. Much of the development had a top down approach.

Dark Ascension develops the themes of Innistrad. The plane is still plagued by Werewolves, Zombies, Vampires, Spirits and other creatures of the night. The set puts a stronger emphasis on those creature types, giving each type of monster more support. Meanwhile, the humans are on the verge of extinction and have to take desperate measures to stem the tide. Dark Ascension has several broken cycles (a cycle where one color is omitted) to show how humans are struggling.

== Storyline ==
The events of the Innistrad block center on the events after the sundering of the Helvault, a giant chunk of silver metal that was used by the archangel Avacyn to imprison Innistrad's worst horrors, the demons. It is then revealed why the archangel Avacyn vanished from the plane in the first place, leaving the humans of the plane defenseless against the gothic horrors of Innistrad.

In the early days of Avacyn's presence in Innistrad, long before the block takes place, the archangel sought to rid the plane of its demonic influences. Accompanied by her fellow angels, she challenged each demon she encountered to single combat, defeating and dispatching them one-by-one. However, since demons are beings composed of pure mana, their defeat only meant that their physical forms were shattered, their dark essence living on. Eventually the black mana would coalesce in another dark corner of the plane, and another demon would appear.

Avacyn soon noted that no matter how many times a demon was defeated, there would always be another one to take its place. All that its destruction would buy was temporary peace to the afflicted towns and villages. Thus, she took an oath, saying "What cannot be destroyed, must be bound". This oath is reflected in the symbol of the archangel herself, the Collar of Avacyn, shaped to bind any evil that would not be destroyed. With this new goal in mind, Avacyn used her divine magics to trap demons, one-by-one in the Helvault. She was so successful at doing this that after a time, only the plane's elder demons remained free of the Helvault's magical prison.

It was then that the great demon Griselbrand decided to challenge Avacyn to single combat, boldly landing on the top of the Helvault itself. For many days the battle raged on between archangel and archdemon, watched only by the church's highest officials (such as Mikaeus, the lunarch) and Avacyn's most powerful angelic compatriots (Gisela, leader of the angelic Flight of Goldnight, was the only one explicitly mentioned to have been a spectator).

Seeing as she could not defeat Griselbrand, Avacyn used all her remaining power to cast a final binding spell to drive the archdemon into the Helvault and seal him away forever. However, at that moment, the demon revealed his endgame, to trap the archangel herself in her own prison. Using his spear, Griselbrand thrust the weapon through her, dealing her a mortal blow just as the binding spell was completed. The spell backfired, drawing in both angel and demon to the Helvault, with the ongoing spectators watching in horror as their beloved archangel was impaled, then imprisoned within the magical chunk of moonsilver.

Because of fears that reporting Avacyn's disappearance would incite mass hysteria and panic among the human denizens of the plane, Mikaeus and the other church officials decided to cover up any reports concerning the reason behind archangel's disappearance. Nevertheless, the archmages and clergy of the Church soon began to feel the aftereffects of the archangel's vanishing. Spells, wards and enchantments began to fail all over Innistrad. Prayers to the archangel went unanswered. Monsters and creatures of the night were no longer held at bay by Avacyn's holy might. Sensing weakness, Innistrad's werewolf howlpacks, vampire hordes and unstoppable waves of zombies began preying actively on the humans.

At the onset of these events in Innistrad, the Planeswalker Liliana Vess had come to the plane of Innistrad to reclaim her soul, which she had traded to four demons in exchange for beauty and power. She believes that by killing her dark debtors, her own bargain would be negated, and she wouldn't have to continue being subservient to these demons. During her earlier days of serving her demonic masters she eventually found and claimed a dark artifact known as the Chain Veil, which greatly amplified the potential of her dark magics. Liliana used the power of the Veil to kill one of her four demonic masters, Kothophed, and she has tracked her next target, Griselbrand, to Innistrad.

During her search for the demon, Liliana was beset by the Planeswalker Garruk Wildspeaker, on whom she had used the Chain Veil to bestow a curse in a previous encounter. However, she managed to fend him off due to the dampening properties of the Veil's curse upon Garruk's nature magic. In the end, Garruk was overwhelmed by a small army of undead raised by Liliana and left for dead.

Upon reaching the great city of Thraben, Liliana uncovers a plot by two rival sibling necromancers to besiege the holy city, the blue-oriented stitcher Geralf, and his black-oriented ghoulcaller sister Gisa. Despite the city receiving warning reports from cathars and inquisitors, not much was done to reinforce the city's walls and failing wards. Due to this lack of adequate preparation, the holy city was caught unawares by the massive army both siblings had amassed. In the end, only the quick thinking of the cathar Thalia spared the city from utter destruction. Thalia's plan was simple, to use the thatched straw roofs of Thraben's houses to create a ring of fire, burning down the entire army of undead. The plan was successful as most of the city was spared from the undead horde, albeit at the loss of many cathars and buildings because of the great fire.

Despite this successful defence, during the siege, Geralf infiltrated the heart of the city and slew Mikaeus, the lunarch himself. Not wanting the news to demoralise the already downcast human citizens of the plane, the other church officials buried the lunarch in secret. Liliana used this opportunity to raise Mikaeus from the dead and interrogate the corpse of Griselbrand's whereabouts, instead learning of the epic battle between Avacyn and her demonic master and their current entrapment in the Helvault.

Not possessing magic capable of sundering the great silver mass, Liliana approached the problem from a different angle. She reanimated a small army of ghouls and zombies and proceeded to attack the sanctuary where the Helvault resided. Now charged with protecting the Helvault at all costs, the newly appointed Guardian of Thraben, Thalia faced off Liliana with a squad of elite cathars backing her up. Catching them completely off guard, Liliana paralyzed the squad of cathars with a wave of dark magic and gave Thalia this ultimatum: sunder the Helvault, or watch her comrades fall to the undead army. It only took the strangled cry of a single cathar as he fell prey to the ghouls that Thalia pointed toward the Helvault and cursed Liliana.

With a great explosion, the silver prison that was the Helvault shattered, releasing demons and archangel alike. No one noticed the ribbons of black mana streaking away from the shattered remains. All eyes were fixed upon the golden helix streaking out into the sky. Avacyn had returned to the plane. When the Helvault shattered, Avacyn emerged at her full strength. Her presence reinfused the Avacynian protective wards with holy magic once again. Her angelic host was restored to its full powers, which gave the humans the chance to gain the upper hand in their fight against evil. The three flights of angels reformed in greater numbers than before. Once again, they became Avacyn's soldiers on the front lines of battle. Only this time, instead of barely containing the monsters of the world, the angels and their human allies began pushing them back, away from the bastions of human civilization. For the first time, they were winning.

Now that Griselbrand was also freed from the Helvault, Liliana continues her search for the demon, and her release from the fell contract she entered into.

Meanwhile, the plane's horrors continued to be driven back by the renewed power of the Church. In the process of purging the town of Gatstaf from the threat of werewolf howlpacks, the villagers appealed to Avacyn to remove the curse of lycanthropy upon their loved ones, whom they could not bear to see put to death because of a curse they could not control. Although she could not undo the werewolf curse, she revealed that she would instead transform those afflicted by the curse (but loyal to her and the Church), fusing the warring aspects of human and wolf into a single creature; the "wolfir". In a powerful wave of spells that would become known as the Cursemute, Avacyn's magic reverberated throughout the plane, transforming not just many werewolves but undoing many of the world's foul curses. The wolfir emerged as a new race of great wolf-creatures dedicated to the principles of the Church of Avacyn.

The Cursemute had an unintended impact on a visitor to the plane: Garruk Wildspeaker. At the moment the Cursemute swept across the land, Garruk was knee-deep in swamp muck surrounded by the severed limbs of Liliana's ghouls. He had barely managed to defeat them, and burdened by the Veil's curse, was slowly descending into madness. Close to death and tormented by pain and fury, Garruk's mind slipped away from him. He wandered in blind circles, shouting at the ravens and imagined monsters. It might have been the end of the great hunter, but for the events unfolding in Gatstaf Spring.

When Avacyn's thaumaturgy reached him, Garruk regained his senses. He stared down at his arms, watching the black veins receding from his skin. He was overcome with joy at the sudden absence of pain and sickness. But the relief was short-lived. Within seconds the veins reappeared, his blood seemed to thicken to tar, and his back bent under the weight of the Veil's curse once again. The Cursemute was enough to bring him back from madness and death, but it was not enough to cure him.

After slogging his way out of the swamp, he came upon Angel's Way, a well-traveled road between Kessig and Thraben. He knew Liliana was heading to Thraben, and he could doggedly continue his pursuit. Or he could strike out another way, toward the origin of the magic he had felt so strongly. There was a power on this plane that could cure curses. Maybe there was another way to rid him of his evil burden—a way that didn't involve the death-witch.

== Tribes ==
In Innistrad, there are five tribes, major creature types that also play a role mechanically. Each tribe is linked to an allied color combination.

- Humans – Humans occur in all colors but occur predominantly in white and green. White humans are frequently depicted as religious officials and warriors under the Church of Avacyn, while green humans are typically monster hunters. This is the first set in which humans are treated as a tribe.
- Spirits – Spirits mainly fall under white and blue mana, but also appear sporadically in the other colors. White spirits typically represent benevolent guardian spirits while blue spirits represent mischievous geists.
- Zombies – Zombies occur in black and blue. Blue zombies (or skaabs) are Frankenstein's Monster-like beings stitched together from disparate body parts and reanimated by necro-alchemists, while black zombies are ones that have risen from their graves through necromancy and attack in hordes.
- Vampires – Vampires occur in black and red. Black vampires showcase the sophisticated individuals that form the vampiric aristocratic families while red vampires usually depict vampires who indulge in mundane pleasures or have gone wild with bloodthirst, becoming utter bloodfeeding savages.
- Werewolves – Werewolves occur in red and green. Every werewolf is a double-faced card with the transform mechanic. One side of each of the werewolf cards represents the afflicted human, while the other side represents the actual werewolf that the cursed human transforms into when certain conditions are met. Green werewolves are usually hermits and outcasts, while red werewolves are mostly bandits and renegades.

== Mechanics ==
Innistrad introduces four new mechanics (Curse, Fight, Morbid, Transform) and reintroduces one old mechanic (Flashback). Curses are a new enchantment subtype that enchants a player, causing negative effects (hence the name) of varying degrees. Fight is a new keyword that refers to two creatures dealing damage to each other equal to their power simultaneously (it had appeared on previous cards, but this is the first time it was keyworded). Morbid conditions occur if a creature has died earlier in the turn that the spell is cast or the ability is used. The transform mechanic allows certain creatures to turn into different creatures once certain conditions specified on the card are met. Each card that can transform is a double-faced card. The returning mechanic (from the Odyssey and Time Spiral blocks) was flashback. Spells with flashback can be played again from the graveyard, essentially getting a second use out of the spell. However, using a Flashback ability removes the card from the game.

All the major mechanics of Innistrad, including Double-faced cards, return for Dark Ascension. Many of the double-faced cards in Dark Ascension are humans on one side and werewolves on the other. Dark Ascension also has a number of cards involving the number 13. Two new mechanics debuted in Dark Ascension: Fateful Hour and Undying. Cards with fateful hour abilities have an enhanced effect when their controller has 5 or fewer life points remaining. Undying is a new keyword mechanic that is featured on creature cards. When a creature with Undying dies, if it had no +1/+1 counters on it, it returns to the battlefield with a +1/+1 counter on it, effectively allowing a creature to survive destruction at least once.

Two new mechanics debuted in Avacyn Restored: miracle and soulbond Miracle is a new keyword found on instants and sorceries. Spells with Miracle have a cheaper, alternate casting cost that can be paid if the spell was the first card drawn during the turn, then immediately cast after being drawn. Soulbond is a new keyword mechanic that is featured on creature cards. When a creature with Soulbond enters the battlefield, it can be paired up with another creature that player controls, granting bonus abilities to both creatures until one or both creatures leave play. Conversely, if another creature enters play, it can be paired with an unpaired creature with Soulbond. Of the mechanics of Innistrad and Dark Ascension, only undying returns for Avacyn.

== Reception ==
In a review of Innistrad in Black Gate, Scott Taylor said "In all, I say bravo to Wizards of the Coast for recapturing the magic of what could have been. Innistrad makes a perfect addition to Magic the Gathering, both in playability and style. I highly recommend taking a look at it if given the chance."

In 2012, Innistrad won the Origins Award for Collectible Card Expansion Game of the Year.

== Notable cards ==
Notable cards from Innistrad include Snapcaster Mage and Liliana of the Veil.

A notable card from Dark Ascension is Lingering Souls.

Notable cards from Avacyn Restored include Griselbrand and Avacyn, Angel of Hope.
