= Scars of Mirrodin =

Block of expansion sets in Magic: The Gathering

- A hexplate beginning to corrode
- Released: October 1, 2010
- Size: 249 cards (101 Common, 60 Uncommon, 53 Rare, 15 Mythic Rare, and 20 Basic Land)
- Keywords: Metalcraft, Imprint, Infect, Proliferate
- Mechanics: Metalcraft, infect, proliferate
- Designers: Mark Rosewater (lead), Mark Gottlieb, Alexis Janson, Erik Lauer, Matt Place, Mark Globus, Nate Heiss
- Developers: Mike Turian (lead), Aaron Forsythe, Erik Lauer, Mark Purvis, Matt Place
- Development code: Lights
- Expansion code: SOM

First set in the Scars of Mirrodin block
Scars of Mirrodin	Mirrodin Besieged	New Phyrexia
← Magic 2011	Mirrodin Besieged →
← Zendikar Block	Innistrad Block →

Mirrodin Besieged
- Mirran/Phyrexian symbols combined
- Released: February 4, 2011
- Size: 155 cards (10 Mythic Rare, 35 Rare, 40 Uncommon, 60 Common, 10 Basic Land)
- Keywords: Battle Cry, Infect, Proliferate
- Mechanics: Living Weapon
- Designers: Mark Gottlieb (lead), Gregory Marques, Ken Nagle, Mark Rosewater, Mike Turian
- Developers: Erik Lauer (lead), Ryan Dhuse, Tom LaPille, Zac Hill, Mike Turian
- Development code: Camera
- Expansion code: MBS

Second set in the Scars of Mirrodin block
Scars of Mirrodin	Mirrodin Besieged	New Phyrexia
← Scars of Mirrodin	New Phyrexia →
← Zendikar Block	Innistrad Block →

New Phyrexia
- Phyrexian Symbol
- Released: May 13, 2011
- Size: 175 cards (10 Mythic Rare, 35 Rare, 60 Uncommon, 60 Common, 10 Basic Land)
- Keywords: Infect, Metalcraft, Proliferate, Imprint
- Mechanics: Phyrexian Mana, Living Weapon
- Designers: Ken Nagle (lead), Dave Guskin, Joe Huber, Matt Place, Mark Rosewater
- Developers: Aaron Forsythe (lead), Dave Guskin, Zac Hill, Tom LaPille, Erik Lauer
- Development code: Action
- Expansion code: NPH

Third set in the Scars of Mirrodin block
Scars of Mirrodin	Mirrodin Besieged	New Phyrexia
← Mirrodin Besieged	Magic 2012 →
← Zendikar Block	Innistrad Block →

Scars of Mirrodin is a Magic: The Gathering block, consisting of the expansion sets Scars of Mirrodin (October 1, 2010), Mirrodin Besieged (February 4, 2011) and New Phyrexia. This block marked the return to the plane of Mirrodin. This plane was last visited in the Mirrodin block that concluded in 2004. The interim tagline for the set was "The Corrosion Begins October 1, 2010." The plans for this set were first made public by mananation.com when it was discovered that "Scars of Mirrodin", as well as "Mirrodin Pure" and "New Phyrexia" had been registered as trademarks with the US Patent and Trademark Office by Wizards of the Coast. As with the original Mirrodin block, artifacts make up the overarching theme of Scars of Mirrodin; Nearly half of all cards in the set are artifacts. In his May 24 column, Mark Rosewater confirmed that the "Infect" game mechanic in Scars of Mirrodin would bring poison counters back to Magic. All cards (other than basic lands) in the Scars of Mirrodin block carried a watermark, either Mirran or Phyrexian.

== Storyline ==
The origins of New Phyrexia date back to the early design stages of the original Mirrodin set. The idea of Phyrexian oil influencing Mirrodin's evolution was included in the storyline for future use.

New Phyrexia was originally planned to be the first set of the "Lights" block, with the storyline being set after the Phyrexians had already conquered Mirrodin. Eventually, designer Mark Rosewater made the decision to build the block around the war between the Mirrans and the Phyrexians, leading up to New Phyrexia after Scars of Mirrodin and Mirrodin Besieged.

In the original announcement from December 9, 2010 it was left open whether this set would be named New Phyrexia or Mirrodin Pure. On March 29, 2011 Wizards of the Coast announced that New Phyrexia was going to be the name of the set. The tagline for Mirrodin Pure would have been "The Sharpest Steel is Tempered in Fire".

== Mechanics ==
Scars of Mirrodin introduced the Phyrexian mechanics Infect and Proliferate, and the Mirran mechanics Metalcraft and Imprint. A creature with infect deals damage to creatures in the form of -1/-1 counters (much like Wither) and to players in the form of poison counters. A player with 10 or more poison counters loses the game. Proliferate allows players to give additional counters to any number of permanents and/or players they so choose who already have them. Imprint was a returning keyword from the original Mirrodin block, and allowed an artifact to gain additional effects if another card is exiled and imprinted on that artifact. Metalcraft rewards a player for having three or more artifacts in play. As with the original Mirrodin block, artifacts that were Equipment and/or were indestructible were printed.

Besides expanding on mechanics from Scars, Mirrodin Besieged introduced the Mirran mechanic Battle Cry, and the Phyrexian mechanic Living Weapon. Whenever a creature with battle cry attacks, all other attacking creatures that player or team controls get +1/+0 until the end of the turn. Living weapon is found only on Equipment. When a piece of Equipment with "Living weapon" enters the battlefield, it creates a 0/0 Black Germ creature token and the Equipment is immediately attached to that token. It expanded on the poison counters mechanic by making certain things happen if players were poisoned.

The four mechanics from Scars and living weapon returned for New Phyrexia. New Phyrexia introduced also Phyrexian Mana Symbols. Mana costs containing Phyrexian mana symbols can be paid with either the given color or two life per Phyrexian Mana symbol. In New Phyrexia, all permanent cards with Phyrexian Mana in their costs are colored artifacts.

== Notable cards ==
Notable cards from Scars of Mirrodin include Mox Opal, Memnite and Sword of Body and Mind.

Notable cards from Mirrodin Besieged include Blightsteel Colossus, Sword of Feast and Famine and Green Sun's Zenith.

Notable cards from New Phyrexia include Elesh Norn, Grand Cenobite, Birthing Pod, Dismember, Mental Misstep, Gitaxian Probe, Karn Liberated and Sword of War and Peace, which completed the Swords cycle begun in the Mirrodin block.
