= Portal (Magic: The Gathering) =

Series of Magic: The Gathering starter level sets

- portal
- Released: May 1, 1997
- Size: between 221–228 cards, depending on language
- Expansion code: POR

First set in the Portal block
Portal	Portal Second Age	Portal Three Kingdoms
← 5th Edition	Weatherlight →

Portal Second Age
- pentagon
- Released: June 23, 1998
- Size: 165 cards
- Keywords: none
- Mechanics: none
- Development code: None
- Expansion code: PO2

Second set in the Portal block
Portal	Portal Second Age	Portal Three Kingdoms
← Exodus	Unglued →

Portal Three Kingdoms
- Chinese character for the number 3
- Released: July 6, 1999
- Size: 180 cards
- Keywords: Horsemanship
- Mechanics: "Zodiac" cycle
- Designers: Henry Stern (lead)
- Development code: None
- Expansion code: PTK

Third set in the Portal block
Portal	Portal Second Age	Portal Three Kingdoms
← Urza's Destiny	Starter →

Portal is the name given to the three Magic: The Gathering starter level sets. The original Portal was released on May 1, 1997, followed by Portal Second Age on June 24, 1998 and Portal Three Kingdoms on July 6, 1999. The Portal set was inspired by Chinese mythology; Three Kingdoms in particular by the 14th century Chinese historical novel Romance of the Three Kingdoms by Luo Guanzhong.

== Set history ==
Portal was Wizards of the Coast's first major attempt at a set that new players could come into the game and understand. Back before the major rules changes brought forth by 6th Edition, Magic rules were more complicated; today, they are simplified with the addition of the stack. The three Portal sets attempted to mitigate the complexity.

The original 215-card Portal set was released in June 1997 and sold in starter sets consisting of two 35-card decks, one booster pack, a play guide, and a play mat, and also in 15-card booster packs.

As of October 2005, all cards Portal, Portal Second Age, and Portal Three Kingdoms are legal in Vintage and Legacy tournaments.

== Mechanics ==
No new mechanics were introduced with Portal, but there were several "simplifications" made to the game through things left out of the set. Instants did not exist within the set (instead, every "one-shot" spell was a sorcery; however, some sorceries could be played at particular times uncommon to sorceries but normal for instants; most of these cards have since received errata making them Instants). All rules text was in boldface. All flavor text and reminder (italicized) text was not boldface. To separate rules text and flavor text, the cards utilized a line with a slight bulge on both top and bottom; this makes the line look like a very elongated diamond. Rather than using the words "block", "graveyard" and "library", Portal used the words "intercept", "discard pile" and "deck". Portal cards had no creature types.

Second Age also did not have Instants, though a number of Sorceries in the set have since received errata from Wizards of the Coast retroactively changing their card type to Instants. It also carried over the different style for rules text. Portal Second Age cards dispensed with the "Summon" wording for creature spells, and were the first to word them as "Creature -- type" that was adopted with 6th Edition. In Second Age, "block" remained as it was, replacing "intercept" from Portal. Similarly, "graveyard" re-replaced "discard pile", and "library" re-replaced "deck".

Portal Three Kingdoms is the only starter level set to introduce a new keyword ability into the game: "Horsemanship", an evasion ability that works like flying in that creatures with horsemanship can be blocked only by creatures with horsemanship. Creatures with horsemanship can block creatures without horsemanship as well, but not be blocked by creatures with flying, likewise Horsemanship creatures cannot block flying creatures. As such, these creatures are effectively 'unblockable' by almost all other creatures. There was controversy when the set became tournament legal, as some players thought that cards with the horsemanship ability should be errata to have flying instead. Wizards of the Coast initially considered making this change but decided against it, stating that the creatures with horsemanship are rare and not aggressive enough to make an impact on vintage formats. Horsemanship has become an obscure ability due to the limited production and geographical release of the set, and Wizards have stated that it will be unlikely that horsemanship will return on new cards in the future. With the release of Time Spiral, Wizards returned a vast number of older pre-8th Edition keyword abilities and mechanics; horsemanship was not among the mechanics that returned. The Magic the Gathering Online set Masters Edition III included a number of cards from the Portal Three Kingdoms set including ones with horsemanship.

== Notable cards ==
Notable cards in the Portal sets include Imperial Seal, Ravages of War, Rolling Earthquake

== Reception ==
In a review in the July 1997 issue of InQuest, Jeff Hannes stated that the "cards are clean, simple, and concise", making the set "an outstanding tool for beginners" who may otherwise have trouble with the terse card text of other Magic: The Gathering sets. He also stated that the set "does an outstanding job...to bring new players into the game at a less-daunting level".
