= Zendikar =

Block of expansion sets in Magic: The Gathering

The Zendikar block is a Magic: The Gathering block consisting of the sets Zendikar (October 2, 2009), Worldwake (February 5, 2010), Rise of the Eldrazi (April 23, 2010). The eponymous setting is a vast, untamed wilderness, whose few bastions of civilization exist primarily for outfitting treasure-seeking expeditions to distant locales. Colossal ancient octahedral stones called "hedrons" float in the sky (hedrons are the expansion symbols for all three blocks). A phenomenon known as "the Roil" causes frequent geological upheaval as it sweeps across the land. Unlike the previous two blocks, there is no multicolored theme (in fact, every colored card in the set is monocolored). Instead, the themes Zendikar and Worldwake revolve around lands, and a theme of an adventure or quest. Rise of the Eldrazi, while part of the Zendikar block creatively and for the sake of constructed tournament rules, is unique mechanically and is designed to be drafted on its own. Drafts in the Zendikar block are either ZEN-ZEN-WWK or ROE-ROE-ROE.

== Zendikar ==
Zendikar
- hedron
- Released: October 2, 2009
- Size: 249 cards (15 Mythic, 53 Rare, 60 Uncommon, 101 Common, 20 Basic Land)
- Keywords: Kicker, Intimidate
- Mechanics: Ally, Landfall, Trap instants, Quest enchantments
- Designers: Mark Rosewater (lead), Doug Beyer, Graeme Hopkins, Kenneth Nagle, Matt Place
- Developers: Henry Stern (lead), Aaron Forsythe, Mark Globus, Erik Lauer, Devin Low, Matt Place, Mike Turian, Steve Warner
- Development code: Live
- Expansion code: ZEN

First set in the Zendikar block
Zendikar	Worldwake	Rise of the Eldrazi
← Masters Edition III	Worldwake →
← Alara Block	Scars of Mirrodin Block →

=== Set details ===
The first cards revealed from the set were a selection of basic lands, each printed with both a traditional frame and a full-art frame reminiscent of lands from Unglued and Unhinged. Cards with the "Landfall" mechanic have effects that are triggered when a land enters the battlefield under the card's owner's control. Adding to the land theme, there are a number of non-basic lands, including lands with a variety of enters-the-battlefield effects that were formerly restricted to creatures.

Zendikar also contains three Planeswalkers: Nissa Revane, who first appeared in the Xbox 360 game Duels of the Planeswalkers; Sorin Markov, an all-new vampire character; and a second version of Chandra Nalaar, Chandra Ablaze, as previously foreshadowed in the novel The Purifying Fire.

To promote the "priceless treasures" tagline of Zendikar, original, authentic vintage cards were inserted into a limited number of booster packs, replacing the basic land. These cards were for collector and incentive purposes only, and were largely not legal for sanctioned Zendikar block play.

Zendikar was the first "large" expansion since Legends where the only random packs were booster packs — 75-card tournament packs, introduced in Urza's Saga, were no longer sold.

=== Mechanics ===
Mechanics in the Zendikar block include allies, intimidate, landfall, quests and traps. Allies, a new creature type, have an effect (getting larger, gaining life, making creature tokens, etc.) that triggers when itself or another Ally enters the battlefield. Intimidate is a new keyword mechanic that makes a creature unable to be blocked except by artifact creatures and creatures that share a color with the creature. In later sets, intimidate replaced "Fear," a similar ability that was restricted largely to black cards. Landfall is a new ability word that causes a permanent to gain an extra ability or become more powerful when a land enters the battlefield under its controller's control. Quests are enchantments that each have two abilities. The first ability causes "quest counters" to be added when a specific event or game state takes place; once a certain number of quest counters is reached, the card's second ability can be used. Trap is a new type of instant that can be cast for a reduced cost if a certain event have taken place this turn. Quests, Traps, and Allies were codenamed "Maps, Traps, and Chaps" in development respectively, and were designed to mechanically reinforce the "Adventure World" setting of Zendikar.

== Worldwake ==
Worldwake
- hedron beginning to open
- Released: February 5, 2010
- Size: 145 cards(10 Mythic Rares, 35 Rares, 40 Uncommons, 60 Commons)
- Keywords: Multikicker
- Mechanics: Ally, Landfall
- Designers: Ken Nagle (lead), Kelly Digges, Mark Globus, Matt Place, Mark Rosewater
- Developers: Mike Turian (Lead), Mark Globus (design rep), Tom LaPille, Erik Lauer, Scott Johns, Mons Johnson
- Development code: Long
- Expansion code: WWK

Second set in the Zendikar block
Zendikar	Worldwake	Rise of the Eldrazi
← Zendikar	Rise of the Eldrazi →
← Alara Block	Scars of Mirrodin Block →

=== Story ===
As the harsh habitats of Zendikar become more dangerous, planeswalker characters gather to Zendikar to explore the ancient ruins for vast treasures and search for answers. The land itself comes to life and ravages its surroundings, consuming forests and destroying mountains. The inhabitants seek answers from their ancestors to discover the cause of this worldwide awakening.

=== Mechanics ===
Worldwake expands on the Landfall, Ally, Trap, and Quest mechanics of Zendikar, as well as introducing some new ones. The landfall mechanic appears in Worldwake on instants as well as on permanent cards: landfall spells may produce a stronger effect or activate a repeatable effect whenever a land card enters the battlefield that turn under its caster's control. This set marked the debut of multikicker, a variant of kicker from Invasion, which allows a player to pay an optional, extra cost when casting a spell to create an additional effect. Unlike kicker, which can only be paid once, multikicker can be paid as many times as the player is able, adding to the additional effect. Worldwake had a cycle of dual-color lands that can turn into creatures, and a cycle of Auras which turn lands into creatures. A quest cycle began in Zendikar and was finished in Worldwake.

== Rise of the Eldrazi ==
Rise of the Eldrazi
- hedron opened
- Released: April 23, 2010
- Size: 248 cards (228 cards plus 20 lands) (15 mythic rares, 53 rares, 60 uncommons, 100 commons)
- Keywords: Annihilator, Totem Armor, Rebound
- Mechanics: Colourless Creatures, Annihilator, Totem Armor, Rebound, Level Up
- Designers: Brian Tinsman (lead), Aaron Forsythe, Graeme Hopkins, Gregory Marques, Bill McQuillian, Devin Low
- Developers: Matt Place (lead), Mark Globus, Erik Lauer, Gregory Marques, Mark Rosewater
- Development code: Prosper
- Expansion code: ROE

Third set in the Zendikar block
Zendikar	Worldwake	Rise of the Eldrazi
← Worldwake	Magic 2011 →
← Alara Block	Scars of Mirrodin Block →

=== Set details ===
Rise of the Eldrazi is themed around "battlecruiser magic": slow games in which players gradually accumulate resources until they can win with enormous creatures. The most prominent of these "battlecruisers" are the Eldrazi, all of whom are colorless because they (in game-universe terms) have transcended the colors of mana. The smallest Eldrazi creature is Hand of Emrakul, a common 7/7 for 9 mana; the largest is Emrakul, the Aeons Torn, a mythic rare 15/15 for 15 mana. To help get these enormous creatures into play quickly, the set features many alternate sources of mana (particularly the "Eldrazi spawn," which can be sacrificed for colorless mana) and a dearth of cheap creature removal. The set features new cards called levelers which gain new abilities when you level them up by paying mana. The flavor of the Eldrazi monsters draws from Lovecraftian horror.

=== Story ===
The set's storyline revolves around the awakening of the Eldrazi: ancient, powerful beings who travel the multiverse and gain sustenance by consuming entire planes for mana. Their home realm is the "Blind Eternities," a space between planes where they transcended the colors of mana as known to the planeswalkers of the Multiverse. Many ages ago they were trapped in Zendikar, but the events of the Worldwake set accidentally released them. Now altruistic planeswalkers must team up with the denizens of Zendikar to stop them. According to Mark Rosewater, the concept of the Eldrazi is inspired by both the Cthulhu mythos and the Marvel Comics character Galactus. After following Chandra to Zendikar, Gideon Jura found the plane besieged by the awakened Eldrazi. Abandoning his mission to find Chandra, Gideon fights the powerful Eldrazi to protect the inhabitants of Zendikar.

=== Mechanics ===
Rise of the Eldrazi introduced a number of new mechanics, including annihilator, level up, rebound and totem armor. Annihilator is found on large Eldrazi creatures, and whenever a creature with the annihilator feature attacks, defending player sacrifices a set number of permanents. Creatures with the new level up keyword can become larger or acquire new abilities for a small investment of mana. The number of level counters on a creature tells you its current level, and its current level tells you its power, toughness, and extra abilities. Leveling a creature up can only be played as a sorcery. Spells with Rebound are exiled after being cast, and can be cast again during your next upkeep for free. After the rebound has triggered, the spell enters the graveyard as normal. Totem Armor is found on white, green and blue Aura Enchantments. If the enchanted creature were to be destroyed (by lethal damage or effects saying Destroy), the enchantment would go to the graveyard instead of the creature.

== Notable cards ==
Notable cards from Zendikar include Spell Pierce, Goblin Guide, Bloodghast and Valakut, the Molten Pinnacle, and the enemy-colored "fetchland" cycle, which can be sacrificed to search for a land with any two enemy-colored basic land types. Notable cards in Worldwake include Abyssal Persecutor, Jace, the Mind Sculptor (the first planeswalker with four abilities), Stoneforge Mystic and the allied manland cycle, most notably Celestial Colonnade and Raging Ravine. Notable cards in Rise of the Eldrazi include Inquisition of Kozilek and Emrakul, the Aeons Torn.

In Rise of the Eldrazi, there are 4 prints of each basic land, which when put together, form a collage.

On June 10, 2011 Stoneforge Mystic was reprinted as part of an event deck (War of Attrition). On June 20, ten days later, the card was banned in standard, as part of the banned and restricted list update. The timing of the release of the event deck meant for tournament play, and the banning of a card in the deck, necessitated a deck-specific exception to the banned and restricted list for the first time. Specifically, if Stoneforge Mystic was used in the exact 75 cards supplied as part of the event deck.
