= Alara block =

Block of expansion sets in Magic: The Gathering

The Alara block is a Magic: The Gathering expert-level expansion block, consisting of the expansion sets Shards of Alara (October 3, 2008), Conflux (February 6, 2009) and Alara Reborn (April 30, 2009). The Alara block focuses on multicolored cards, in particular cards with three or more colors.

== Shards of Alara ==
Shards of Alara
- five-shard crystal
- Released: October 3, 2008
- Size: 249 cards (15 Mythic Rare, 53 Rare, 60 Uncommon, 101 Common, 20 Basic Lands)
- Keywords: Exalted, Unearth, Devour, Cycling
- Designers: Bill Rose (lead), Aaron Forsythe, Devin Low, Mark Rosewater, Mark Gottlieb, Brian Tinsman, Mike Turian, Matt Place, Erik Lauer, Alexis Janson, Ken Nagle, Mark Globus, Graeme Hompkins, Noah Weil, Mike Mikaelian
- Developers: Devin Low (lead)
- Development code: Rock
- Expansion code: ALA

First set in the Alara block
Shards of Alara	Conflux	Alara Reborn
← Masters Edition II	Conflux →
← Shadowmoor Block	Zendikar Block →

=== Set details ===
Bill Rose was the lead designer for Shards of Alara, and Devin Low was its lead developer. Shards is a multicolor set which revolves around three-color combinations. Its tagline is, "Five worlds share one fate." The set consists of 249 cards, of which 20 are basic lands, 101 are common, 60 uncommon, 53 rare, and 15 mythic rare. It was the first set to contain cards of the mythic rarity.

The design of Shards of Alara focuses on five different "shards" which originally formed a single world. Mechanically, each shard consists of one of the five magic colors and its two allied colors. Each shard has its own keyword mechanic or strong overarching theme, and its own creature types. The five shards were designed separately by three person design teams.

Shard Name	Primary Color	Secondary Colors	Primary Mechanic	Dominant creature types	Planeswalker	Design team
Bant	White	Green; Blue	Exalted	Angels, Rhox, Aven, and Humans	Elspeth, Knight-Errant	Brian Tinsman, Kenneth Nagle, Mark Rosewater
Esper	Blue	White; Black	All creatures are colored artifact creatures	Humans, Sphinxes, Homunculi, and Vedalken	Tezzeret the Seeker	Mark Rosewater, Mark Globus, Mark Gottlieb
Grixis	Black	Blue; Red	Unearth	Demons, Zombies, Humans, and Skeletons	Nicol Bolas (introduced in Conflux)	Devin Low, Erik Lauer, Brian Tinsman
Jund	Red	Black; Green	Devour	Dragons, Goblins, Humans, and Viashino	Sarkhan Vol	Bill Rose, Mark Globus, Mike Turian
Naya	Green	Red; White	Rewards playing creatures with a power of 5 or greater	Humans, Beasts, Elves, and Leonin	Ajani Vengeant	Kenneth Nagle, Mark Rosewater, Mike Turian

Shards of Alara introduced several changes in Wizards' design and publishing approach. Shards and later sets have a smaller number of cards, to reduce the size of the card pool for Block and Standard constructed tournament formats. A new level of rarity, "Mythic Rare", was added; mythic rares replace a booster pack's rare card in 1 out of 8 packs. Also, as part of a move to make products more friendly to beginners, booster packs include a basic land in place of one of the commons, and pre-constructed decks will be rebranded as "Intro Packs" including a 41-card preconstructed deck and one booster pack. There were design changes to the fat pack, which for Shards of Alara includes five distinct box arts and the replacement of the usual set novel with an excerpt from A Planeswalker's Guide to Alara. Shards was the last set for which tournament packs were released. These changes held for Conflux and Alara Reborn.

Shards of Alara also brought new planeswalker cards to the game. The first multicolored planeswalker to be revealed publicly was the red and green Sarkhan Vol. It was followed shortly by the white and red Ajani Vengeant, which is a new form of Ajani Goldmane from the Lorwyn set, and was the promotional card at Shards prerelease events and Launch Parties in September/October 2008.

=== Story ===
The plane of Alara, once rich with mana, was torn apart by an unknown planeswalker. The world survived, but it was split into five distinct shards. Each of the shards lacks two of the five colors of mana, which influenced their development and created different environments.

=== Mechanics ===
Shards of Alara introduced the mechanics of devour, exalted and unearth.

== Conflux ==
Conflux
- five-shard shield
- Released: February 6, 2009
- Size: 145 cards (10 Mythic Rare, 35 Rare, 40 Uncommon, 60 Common)
- Keywords: Domain
- Mechanics: 5 color cards / abilities
- Designers: Bill Rose (lead), Mark Globus, Mark Gottlieb, Kenneth Nagle
- Developers: Mike Turian (lead), Graeme Hopkins, Erik Lauer, Devin Low
- Development code: Paper
- Expansion code: CON

Second set in the Alara block
Shards of Alara	Conflux	Alara Reborn
← Shards of Alara	Alara Reborn →
← Shadowmoor Block	Zendikar Block →

=== Story ===
The storyline focuses on the chaos which results from the Shards being forced together in a ring, constantly raking against one another. Esper finds itself clashing with Grixis and Bant, Bant is wedged between Esper and Naya, Naya finds its way between Bant and Jund, Jund conflicts with Grixis and Naya, and Grixis is pressed between Esper and Jund.

=== Mechanics ===
Conflux continues the Shards of Alara set's multicolor theme, expanding on it by introducing five-colored cards to the Alara block. Conflux is the set with the highest number of five-colored cards of all Magic sets. Aside from the multicolored theme, the set makes use of the mechanics introduced in Shards of Alara, Exalted, Unearth, and Devour. Conflux also introduced Domain, an ability word which refers to an effect involving the number of basic land types among lands the player controls (this had been used in Invasion, but not as a keyword). Conflux expands on the existing mechanics of cycling and protection in the form of basic landcycling and protection from everything.

== Alara Reborn ==
Alara Reborn
- bound shards
- Released: April 30, 2009
- Size: 145 cards (10 Mythic Rare, 35 Rare, 40 Uncommon, 60 Common)
- Keywords: Cascade, Cycling, Landcycling
- Mechanics: Cascade, Cycling, Landcycling, Exalted, Unearth, Devour, Hybrid
- Designers: Aaron Forsythe (lead), Mark Gottlieb, Alexis Janson, Brian Tinsman
- Developers: Matt Place (lead), Dave Guskin, Alexis Janson, Erik Lauer, Mike Turian
- Development code: Scissors
- Expansion code: ARB

Third set in the Alara block
Shards of Alara	Conflux	Alara Reborn
← Conflux	Magic 2010 →
← Shadowmoor Block	Zendikar Block →

=== Set details ===
Alara Reborn is the first set in the history of Magic: The Gathering to consist entirely of multicolored, or "gold", cards (cards which require mana of more than one color to play). It expands on the mechanics, themes and flavor established in Shards of Alara and Conflux, but creates new combinations of creatures under the influence of more than one shard, such as coloured artifact creatures from Esper that have the Bant ability Exalted.

=== Mechanics ===
Alara Reborn continues on the Shards of Alara set's Exalted, Unearth and Devour mechanics, as well as the Shadowmoor and Ravnica blocks' Hybrid Mechanic. Cards using the Hybrid Mechanic in this set lack the usual hybrid card border colors as they include a third color outside of the hybrid colors. It has also brought about the new mechanic called Cascade, which reflects the chaotic, magical nature of the Maelstrom(a huge mana-storm that has gathered about the centre of the now-reborn Alara) in altering the nature of otherwise normal spells. When you play a spell with cascade, exile cards from the top of your library until you remove a nonland card that costs less. You may cast it without paying its mana cost. Put the removed cards on the bottom in a random order. This mechanic effectively means that when you cast a spell with the "Cascade" keyword, you get to cast at least one other "free" spell directly from your library.

== Reception ==
Shards of Alara won the 2009 Origins Award as "Best Collectible Card Game or Expansion".

== Notable cards ==
Notable cards from Shards of Alara include Elspeth, Knight-Errant and Tezzeret the Seeker.

Notable cards from Conflux include Noble Hierarch, Path to Exile and Progenitus.

Notable cards from Alara Reborn include Bloodbraid Elf and Maelstrom Pulse.
