= Magic: The Gathering Conspiracy =

Magic: The Gathering set and play format

Conspiracy
- Released: June 6, 2014
- Size: 210 Cards
- Mechanics: Will of the Council, Dethrone, Parley, Morbid, Multikicker, Hidden Agenda
- Designers: Shawn Main (lead), Dan Helland, David Humpherys, Kenneth Nagle, Matt Tabak
- Developers: David Humpherys (lead), Dan Emmons, K. Joseph Huber, Sam Stoddard, and Gavin Verhey, Matt Tabak
- Development code: Hydra
- Expansion code: CNS
← Journey Into Nyx	Magic 2015 →

Conspiracy is a Magic: The Gathering set and format released on June 6, 2014, cryptically announced through a strange card at the Born of the Gods prerelease events at a game store in the Philippines. It was designed as the first ever multiplayer draft format and is released as boosters, each with 10 commons, 3 uncommons, 1 rare or mythic rare, 1 "draft matters" card of any rarity, and 1 token or marketing card. The tagline for the set is "Pick. Plot. Play.". Many cards from past expansions show up in Conspiracy, but there are also 65 new cards. Excluding the 13 "Conspiracy"-type cards, which can be only used in Conspiracy or Cube drafts, all of the new cards are legal in the Vintage, Legacy, and Commander formats.

Unlike all sets that released after 2002 (other than parody set Unhinged), Conspiracy was not released in Magic Online. A subset of the new cards that are neither "Conspiracy"-type nor have draft-related ability were featured as a part of the Magic Online exclusive set Vintage Masters, including cards with the Conspiracy-themed mechanics Will of the Council, Parley, and Dethrone. Nineteen cards that are not of the "Conspiracy"-type nor having draft-related ability are still not available in any form on Magic Online.

== Sequel ==
On February 26, 2016, Wizards of the Coast announced a sequel to Conspiracy titled Conspiracy: Take the Crown. This set was previously announced as Conspiracy: The Reign of Brago and Conspiracy: The Empty Throne to create buildup. It was released in August 2016.

== Gameplay ==
Unlike normal drafts, during which players pass around booster packs and pull out one card that they want through each rotation, Conspiracy has drafts of six to eight players who split up into two groups for a free-for-all. Card mechanics deal primarily with the adjusted draft format, such as Cogwork Librarian's effect, which allows a player to exchange it for a different drafted card. A new card type, Conspiracy, was introduced; these special cards are set aside at the start of the game and provide bonus effects at no mana cost, sometimes after remaining hidden. A new Planeswalker, Dack Fayden, was introduced, marking the character's debut on a card after first appearing in a 2011 comic book.
