= Masters Edition =

Series of Magic: The Gathering Online expansions

- Released: 10 September 2007
- Size: 195 cards (60 rare, 60 uncommon, 60 common, 15 basic land)
- Expansion code: MED, ME2, ME3, ME4
← 10th Edition	Lorwyn →

Masters Edition is a series of Magic: The Gathering expansions that have been released exclusively for Magic: The Gathering Online. Each set consists of reprints from early Magic sets that had yet to be released to Magic Online. To date, four incarnations of Master's Edition, as well as a spinoff have been released:

- The original Masters Edition (in short "MED" or "ME1") was released on September 10, 2007. It features 195 cards printed before Mirage, 60 of each rarity and the 15 basic lands of Beta.
- Masters Edition II (in short "ME2") was released on September 22, 2008. It features 245 cards, 80 of each rarity and the 5 snow-covered basic lands of Ice Age.
- Masters Edition III (in short "ME3") was released on September 7, 2009. It consists of 230 cards, 70 rare, 70 uncommons, 75 commons, and 15 basic lands.
- Masters Edition IV (in short "ME4") was released on January 10, 2011. It consists of 269 cards: 105 rares, 72 uncommons, 80 commons, and 12 special lands.
- Vintage Masters (in short "VMA") was released on June 16, 2014. It consists of 325 cards: 9 specials (Power Nine), 30 mythic rares, 105 rares, 80 uncommons, 101 commons.

Masters sets released in both "paper" and real-life began to be released in 2013 with the release of Modern Masters; these new Masters sets also consisted entirely of reprints, but with more of a focus on cards scarce in real-life as well as new drafting environments.

== Premise ==
Invasion was the first expansion released on Magic Online. Since then, the older expansions from Mirage forward have been retroactively released with accompanying draft and sealed queues. The sets before Mirage, however, were not built for limited play and did not present a fun or balanced draft environment. Because of the nature of the online environment, most cards enter the system through drafting. The Masters Edition series is Wizards of the Coast's solution to bring the game's earliest cards online in draftable sets.

Beginning with Masters Edition III, cards from the Portal set were included in the Master's Editions.

All cards in each Masters Edition set are available in regular and premium foil versions. As all of the cards were originally released before the foiling process was introduced to Magic and most have not been reprinted since, these cards are now available as premium foils for the first time and exclusively for Magic Online. Masters Editions II, III, IV have had tribal themes; the original Master's Edition did not.

Similar concept were later used in the design of Modern Masters in paper format, as well as the Vintage Masters in Magic Online.

== Masters Edition I ==
Masters Edition was originally meant to be drafted with 10th Edition but its popularity led Wizards to create Masters Edition-only drafts. The set heavily focused on nostalgia and included some of the most popular casual cards from the early sets. Notably, it missed powerful early cards like the Alpha, Beta, Unlimited, and Revised dual lands.

== Masters Edition II ==
While Masters Edition was rather unspecifically designed to bring some older cards to Magic Online, Masters Edition II was designed to bring more specific cards to the environment. The second installment of the series was to bring the youngest, previously unreleased cards to Magic Online. It thus consists mainly of cards from Fallen Empires, Ice Age, Homelands, and Alliances.

Unlike the first Masters Edition, this set was meant to be drafted on its own. However, as head designer Erik Lauer admits in an article, "Masters Edition II wasn't a fan favorite." The limited environment was supposed to be slow and strategic, but often mistakes in drafting and playing were not apparent to players, thus leading to frustration as they could not make sense of the environment. Lauer also admitted that he made "a fair amount of mistakes" in the designing of the set.

The Snow supertype was a major mechanic in Masters Edition II. It functions like a tag. It has no effect on gameplay on its own, but there are many cards in Masters Edition II that care whether a card is a snow card. Masters Edition II has a minor tribal theme. Fungus, Orc, and Soldiers appear in limited quantities. The number of cards synergistic with these creatures' tribes is also very limited, although there are a few cards like Fungal Bloom and Orcish Captain that encourage playing tribal cards.

== Masters Edition III ==
Masters Edition III consists mainly of cards from The Dark, Legends, and Portal Three Kingdoms. While The Dark and Legends reflect the era Masters Edition III cards should be mostly from, the Portal Three Kingdoms cards are arguably the most distinctive part of ME3 even though that set was released five years after Legends and The Dark. This is because one of the most widely used creature abilities in Magic, "Flying", is almost completely replaced by its Portal Three Kingdoms counterpart, "Horsemanship". The other mechanics employed in Masters Edition III are multicolored cards and Legendary Creatures. Masters Edition III has a minor tribal theme of Faeries, Kobolds, and Minotaurs. Masters Edition III also reprints six World Enchantments.

== Masters Edition IV ==
The fourth installment of the series consists mainly of cards from Beta, Arabian Nights, Antiquities, and the Portal sets. While Beta, Arabian Nights, and Antiquities reflect the era Masters Edition IV cards should mostly be from, the Portal and Starter cards in the set were necessary to create an enjoyable limited environment. Otherwise the number of creatures with an acceptable power level would have been too small. The mechanics employed in Masters Edition IV focus on artifacts. Finally Birds, Zombies, Goblins, and Elephants are the tribes used in Masters Edition IV. The most prominent exception to this are the original dual lands, which had been previously printed across two sets, but here are reprinted in their entirety.

== Vintage Masters ==
Vintage Masters was announced on October 21, 2013, and was released on June 16, 2014, with Prereleases starting on June 13, 2014. The set includes the Power Nine, along with new cards from Conspiracy (a recent set not released in Magic Online) and is designed to be usable for Booster Draft and Sealed Deck.

== Notable cards ==
Notable cards from the original Masters set include the blue staple Force of Will and black staple Hymn to Tourach

Notable cards from Masters Edition II include the allied dual lands (Badlands, Savannah, Taiga, Tundra and Underground Sea) as well as the cards Imperial Seal, Mana Crypt, and Necropotence.

Notable cards from Masters Edition III include the Vintage staple Bazaar of Baghdad, the counterspell Mana Drain and the enemy colored dual lands (Bayou, Plateau, Scrubland, Tropical Island, and Volcanic Island).

Masters Edition IV has a large number of powerful and/or iconic cards. Balance, Channel, Demonic Tutor, Fastbond, Library of Alexandria, Mana Vault, Regrowth, Sol Ring, Strip Mine, Time Vault, and Wheel of Fortune are all currently restricted in Vintage. Mishra's Workshop is banned from Legacy and a cornerstone of Vintage play. Finally Maze of Ith, Sinkhole, Swords to Plowshares, and the original dual lands are all powerful and iconic cards from the game's past. It also released either an Urza's Mine, Urza's Power Plant, or Urza's Tower in place of a basic land.
