= Mark Rosewater =

American game designer (born 1967)

Mark Rosewater (born May 25, 1967) is an American game designer. Since 2003, he has been the head designer for the trading card game Magic: The Gathering.

== Early life and education ==
Rosewater grew up in Pepper Pike, Ohio. After graduating from Orange High School he attended Boston University, where he earned a Bachelor of Science in Communication.

== Career ==
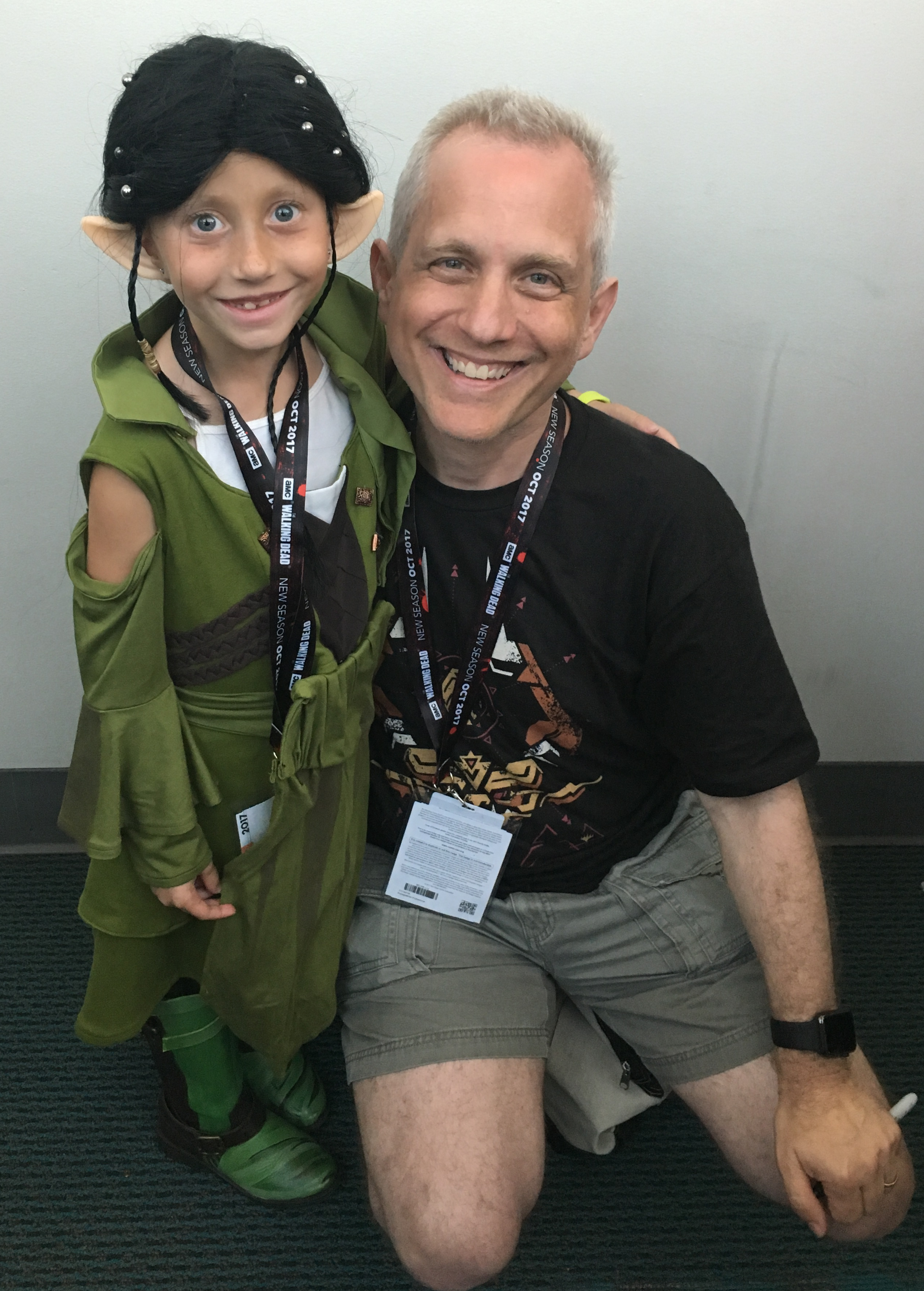
Rosewater (right) with Magic player Dana Fischer in 2017

After graduating from college, Rosewater worked in television as a "runner" before being hired as a writer for the series Roseanne. He received a writing credit for the episodes "Vegas, Vegas" and "Take My Bike, Please", which both aired in 1991.

While working as a freelance writer, Rosewater took a job at a game store, where he found out about Magic: The Gathering from a customer. Since 1995, he has worked for Wizards of the Coast, the company that publishes Magic. In his early years at Wizards, he wrote behind-the-scenes articles about Magic design for the magazines The Duelist, Topdeck and The Sideboard. He created Magic-themed puzzles, some of which were published in the 1996 book Magic: The Puzzling. Rosewater also writes about psychographic profiles of Magic players.

Since 1996, Rosewater has worked as a Magic card designer. Prior to December 2003, he was the senior head designer for Magic. He then became the lead designer, later known as the head designer. He was also the lead designer for 38 expansion sets. As the head designer, he writes an annual "State of Design" column in which he reviews Magic design from the previous year. He also publishes a podcast about Magic called Drive to Work.

== Personal life ==
Mark Rosewater is married to Lora Rosewater, and they have three children.
