= Strixhaven: School of Mages =

Magic: The Gathering expansion set

- Released: April 23, 2021
- Designers: Mark Rosewater (lead)
- Development code: Fencing
- Expansion code: STX
← Kaldheim	Dungeons & Dragons: Adventures in the Forgotten Realms →

Strixhaven: School of Mages is a Magic: The Gathering expansion set. It is not part of a block. The set was released in April 2021.

== Setting ==
Poster map of Strixhaven University which highlights the five colleges and the Biblioplex.

The plane of Arcavios and its magical university Strixhaven were "created from scratch by the world-building team" for the 2021 Strixhaven: School of Mages post-block Magic set expansion. Dot Esports highlighted that Wizards of the Coast "made substantial efforts to make the colleges of Strixhaven feel distinct from their Ravnican counterparts. This was accomplished by leaning into the tension between each color pair, leading to conflicts between and within colleges. [...] Within each college are two separate philosophies that students can align with. [...] The team created a magic system that applies specific forms of spellcasting and philosophies to each college".

=== Colleges of Strixhaven ===
Strixhaven's colleges were founded by five Elder Dragons. Each college is defined by two color philosophies and "each college has two deans that are aligned with one color".

- Lorehold: a college focused on history with "passionate scholars", "diligent researchers and daring adventurers".
- Witherbloom: a college for "goth bio majors" where students "draw power from the essence of living beings, whether that means enhancing nature or exploiting it".
- Prismari: a college for the theatre and art kids where students use magic to express themselves.
- Quandrix: a college focused on math where students "study patterns, fractals, and symmetries to command power over the fundamental forces of nature".
- Silverquill: a college for "literature nerds" where students "wield the magic of words, from inspiring battle poetry to biting arcane insults".

=== Biblioplex ===
At the center of the university is the library known as the Biblioplex. This library contains both the Hall of Oracles and the Mystical Archive. This archive "is said to contain a copy of every spell ever created in the Multiverse"; this provides a lore explanation for the Mystical Archive cards where "all the uncommons are reprints of Standard-legal instants and sorceries, while the rares and mythics will continue to exist outside of Standard play. However, regardless of which rarity of spell you open in your draft booster, you’ll be able to draft and play it in Limited".

=== Planeswalkers ===
A number of Planeswalkers appear in the Strixhaven storyline such as Professor Onyx (better known as Liliana Vess), Kasmina (introduced in the War of the Spark), Lukka (introduced in Ikoria: Lair of Behemoths) and the twins Rowan and Will Kenrith (last seen in Eldraine).

== Mechanics ==
There are draft archetypes themed around each of Strixhaven's colleges. Polygon reported that Magic is "running with this year’s emphasis on the Commander format — a multiplayer style of Magic that uses 100-card decks — each of Strixhaven’s colleges will have its own unique retail Commander decks".

This set added the Magecraft keyword ability (which provides a bonus to an instant or a sorcery) and the "Learn And Lesson" mechanic (which allows a player to cast spells from outside of the game or in the sideboard that they own). CBR reported that "the keywords and mechanics of the Strixhaven: School of Mages set revolve around the idea of magical students learning and growing over the course of a semester, but there is also the ward ability, which is more defensive in nature. [...] The idea is that these clever students are not yet masters, so they can't totally defend themselves, but they are smart enough to disorient their enemies and force them to decide how to spend their mana more carefully. [...] Players can attend class, and many spells in this set allow the player to learn lessons in the middle of a game".

== Related products ==
=== Strixhaven: A Curriculum of Chaos ===
In June 2021, it was announced that the third Magic: The Gathering campaign setting adapted for Dungeons & Dragons would be Strixhaven: A Curriculum of Chaos (2021); this sourcebook will introduce the Strixhaven setting to Dungeons & Dragons in December 2021. Greg Tito, Dungeons & Dragons Senior Communications Manager, said to IGN that "the D&D guidebooks around Ravnica, and Theros have done amazingly well, and we thought that the Strixhaven storyline would appeal not only to fans of Magic and fans of D&D, but [also a] younger audience. There is a ton of information on how to create a campaign that would appeal to people of all ages... who love that kind of young adult coming-of-age storytelling – and so we thought Strixhaven would be perfect for dramatizing that in a D&D game". CBR reported that "in the world of Magic: The Gathering, Strixhaven is the largest and most powerful magic academy in the multiverse [...]. Due to its relatively recent addition to the Magic: The Gathering universe, it's likely this Dungeons & Dragons adventure will significantly expand on the lore associated with the magic school".

== Reception ==
Polygon reported that "on the surface, Magic: The Gathering’s new set, Strixhaven: School of Mages, looks like a simple pastiche of Harry Potter’s Hogwarts. That’s definitely part of its charm. But the intricacies of this new set — and the promise of its accompanying lore — could make it the biggest release of the year. [...] Fledgling mages who apply to Strixhaven must narrow their field of study during their first year of schooling. To represent that, developers have remixed the game’s classic multi-color deck combinations" which are represented in the various colleges. Ash Parrish, for Kotaku, highlighted that "Strixhaven is a school for mages founded by five powerful dragons, each with their own disciplines and personalities. [...] Strixhaven sounds very much like a real university with math, science, history, and literature departments, each with their unique magical flair. [...] With Strixhaven, I’m really excited to get to know more about the world. It seems like so much fun—a stark contrast to Magic’s usual stories of war or surviving in monster-infested environments. Strixhaven seems like it’s just kids learning and having a good time, and that’s a nice change of pace". Dot Esports also commented that "mage schools are a common fantasy trope and often appear in popular fiction, from Harry Potter to the College of Winterhold in Skyrim. [...] Strixhaven subverted these expectations by creating a world that was all Magic, with little to no references to other popular media".

Ash Parrish, for Kotaku, also highlighted that many fans have "spoken out against Magic’s characterization" of the student character Killian Lu due to "the use of tired Asian stereotypes like the hyperfocus on honor and the model minority myth. It’s upsetting to see this story crop up during a nationwide spike in anti-Asian hate crimes and so soon after the killings in Atlanta. It’s especially upsetting considering Magic already has other Asian characters whose stories center their identities as Asian people but don’t revolve around stereotypes".

CBR highlighted that "the magecraft ability is arguably Strixhaven's most exciting and flexible keyword of all, and it typically appears on creatures of all colors. With all of these cards, casting or copying an instant or sorcery will trigger magecraft, which encourages the player to have plenty of instants and sorceries in their deck. [...] Players should note that while Wizards of the Coast is no longer making blocks of Magic sets, it is still possible to make unofficial "blocks." The Zendikar Rising, Kaldheim and Strixhaven: School of Mages sets form a very loose three-set block, with the common theme being +1/+1 counters and modal double-faced cards". Screen Rant highlighted that "in every Strixhaven booster pack, there is a Mystical Archive card that repurposes a powerful spell from a past set. In the physical trading card game, this is simply a nice bonus for certain formats. In MTG Arena, the Archive is introducing a pile of new power into its evergreen format, Historic. [...] New players cracking into Magic: The Gathering packs will find a lot to like about these spotlight spells, and veteran players will find some old and famously powerful cards to utilize again. [...] With reprints like the Mystical Archive and other new sets like the Historical Anthology series, though, MTG Arena's Historic format gets closer and closer to a version of Magic: The Gathering that all players can recognize".

== Stolen artwork ==
In March, 2021, it was discovered that the artwork for the card Crux of Fate drawn by freelance artist Jason Felix had been plagiarized. The art in the card of the dragon Nicol Bolas had been lifted from fan artwork by Kitt Lapeña published in 2016 on DeviantArt. Also, the depiction of Ugin, the Spirit Dragon in the card appears to have also been copied from fan artwork by Raymond Swanland. Wizards of the Coast said in a statement "It has come to our attention that the card Crux of Fate from the Strixhaven: School of Mages Mystical Archive may overtly feature Magic: The Gathering fan art and the contracted artist did not receive permission for this incorporation, [...] These actions do not reflect the values of Wizards, and, as a result, we will be suspending future work with Jason Felix until we have been able to bring this matter to successful conclusion." Felix would later apologize on his Twitter claiming that reason for his actions was due to being "overworked".
