= Dungeons & Dragons: Adventures in the Forgotten Realms =

Magic: The Gathering expansion set

- Released: July 23, 2021
- Development code: Zebra
- Expansion code: AFR
← Strixhaven: School of Mages	Innistrad: Midnight Hunt →

Dungeons & Dragons: Adventures in the Forgotten Realms is an expansion set for Magic: The Gathering (Magic) released in July 2021. The world of the Forgotten Realms was created by game designer Ed Greenwood around 1967 as a paracosm for his childhood stories and premiered as a campaign setting for the Dungeons & Dragons (D&D) fantasy role-playing game in the Forgotten Realms Campaign Setting (1987). This expansion set is the third collaboration (but the first to result in a Magic set) between Magic and D&D; both teams are part of Wizards of the Coast.

== Setting ==
The Forgotten Realms is a fantasy world setting, described as a world of strange lands, dangerous creatures, and mighty deities, where magic and supernatural phenomena are quite real. It is also one of the most popular D&D settings. The setting often focuses on the sub-continent of Faerûn on the planet Abeir-Toril. Economically and technologically, Faerûn is comparable to Western Europe during the late Middle Ages. However, the presence of magic also exists in the world. Faerûn is home to a number of human and non-human creatures of varying degrees of civilization or barbarism. Most of the population of Faerûn consists of farmers, who are organized somewhat loosely in a semi-feudal system. There are also a number of notable cities, and trade between nations is common, as in the Renaissance era. Likewise, there are regions where more barbaric tribes and customs persist.

Many D&D characters appear in this set such as: Bahamut, Mordenkainen, Lolth, Zariel, Volo and the Companions of the Hall (Drizzt Do'Urden, Wulfgar, Catti-brie and Bruenor Battlehammer). The set also includes creatures from the Monster Manual (such as beholders, mind flayers, and displacer beasts), along with notable D&D items (such as the vorpal sword and a +2 mace). Xavier Johnson, for Dot eSports, reported that the set's design team wanted to evoke both the Forgotten Realms setting "and the feeling of actually playing D&D".

=== Development ===
This expansion set is the third collaboration between the Wizards of the Coast's Magic and D&D teams. Christian Hoffer, for ComicBook.com, reported that there was constant collaboration between the D&D team and the Magic team during development of the set, as there had been for the campaign setting books Guildmasters' Guide to Ravnica (2018) and Mythic Odysseys of Theros (2020). Hoffer wrote that the D&D team "provided extensive feedback on both the visuals and lore of the Forgotten Realms". Game designer James Wyatt highlighted that this top-down set was "an opportunity to look at the deep worldbuilding of the Forgotten Realms and find what was most essential to get across in a Magic set, as a way to introduce not just the world of the Forgotten Realms but the fun of playing D&D to Magic players as well. [...] There’s the added job here of trying to communicate some of the feeling of actually playing D&D, which is a little different than the feeling of exploring the world of the Forgotten Realms. I’d say the balance, by and large, tips toward the world, with just enough nods in the direction of the D&D experience".

=== Canon ===
Several D&D characters appear in this set as planeswalker cards; these are typically characters who have traveled the planes within the multiverse of D&D. These characters, however, do not "have a Planeswalker Spark" as defined in Magic's lore since Adventures in the Forgotten Realms is not considered to be a part of the "story continuity" of Magic's multiverse per Mark Rosewater. Blake Rasmussen, senior public relations manager at Wizards of the Coast, told Polygon that "for now this is not canon in the Magic universe. [Likewise] Magic is not canon in the Dungeons & Dragons universe — but we reserve the right to change our mind in the future".

== Mechanics ==
Dungeons & Dragons: Adventures in the Forgotten Realms introduced multiple new mechanics to the game:

- Dice rolling utilizes D&D's "traditional d20" to add randomness and tension to the set; this is the first instance of dice rolling in "black-bordered Magic".
- "Venture into the Dungeon" is a keyword action used in conjunction with the new "Dungeon" card type. This mechanic requires the player to explore a "new level of the dungeon (and effect to trigger) every time they play a spell or activate an ability with the venture keyword action". VentureBeat called this mechanic "a neat way to capture the flavor of D&D within Magic".
- "Pack tactics" is a mechanic that only appears on red and green cards which "causes an effect when creatures attack with a combined power of 6 or greater". Dot eSports highlighted that this mechanic is "similar to the Boast mechanic introduced in Kaldheim" and "synergizes with Aggro strategies".

== Reception ==
Chris Neill, for Kotaku Australia, wrote that "What Forgotten Realms does well is that it combines the best of Dungeons & Dragons with the best of Magic in a way that appeals to fans of both games. [...] I really like the set’s attention to detail and how it celebrates the entire history of the tabletop RPG. [...] The new dungeon cards help introduce the storytelling mechanics of D&D, while the combination of creatures, enchantments and artifacts acts like a kind of character creation. Each game now plays like a mini-adventure, so get ready to roll for initiative".

Dale Bashir, for IGN Southeast Asia, highlighted that "For D&D fans, the new Adventures in the Forgotten Realms card set is a great opportunity to experience D&D in a whole new way, as well as a great gateway into the intricate gameplay of MTG. [...] This is also the first time that traditional D&D mechanics will be integrated into MTG cards, which definitely adds a whole new dimension to the traditional way of playing. Leaving things to chance via a dice roll really adds an extra element of luck and skill to MTG's usual strategic game style. For MTG fans, these D&D-themed cards are not only some of the most valuable cards in the future for collectors, but they also feature some unique skills that regular MTG cards won't have. This is a unique way of changing the dynamic of a deck for the better".

Alexander Sowa, for CBR, reviewed the four commander decks associated with this set: Aura of Courage, Draconic Rage, Dungeons of Death, and Planar Portal. Sowa wrote that "Aura of Courage is a powerful but fragile deck. It's at its best when stacking buffs onto an individual creature but can leave itself open to retaliation if those creatures are removed. [...] Draconic Rage is a pretty straightforward deck. It uses green's high mana production to ramp out large threats and then turns them sideways, swinging in for massive damage. [...] Dungeons of Death is a control deck with a graveyard focus, requiring careful management of resources to stay ahead. [...] Planar Portal is a slow, value-oriented political deck with lots of card and mana generation to support its weaker color identity".
