= Zendikar Rising =

Magic: The Gathering expansion set

- Released: September 25, 2020
- Size: 280 cards
- Development code: Diving
- Expansion code: ZNR
← Ikoria: Lair of Behemoths	Kaldheim →

Zendikar Rising is the 85th Magic: The Gathering expansion and is not part of a block. It is set on the plane of Zendikar. It was released on September 25, 2020. The sets development codename is "Diving", and its expansion code is ZNR.

== Setting ==
The Battle for Zendikar (2015) set featured the battle between the denizens of Zendikar and the cosmic horror entities known as the Eldrazi. While the Eldrazi were defeated, it left the plane of Zendikar scarred. The Zendikar Rising set marks the return to a wilderness adventure storyline; the plane is "a place of danger and excitement. It contains hidden shrines and trapped eldritch creatures deep beneath the surface. It also has a thing called the Roil, a magical force that shapes and reshapes the world at will. When the Roil gets going, anything could happen. This river could become a mountain. This cliff could become a seaside paradise. That pile of rocks could become the murderous creature from the previous paragraph. It’s unpredictable".

=== Planeswalkers ===
While "most of Magic: the Gathering's main characters have been missing in action" since the War of the Spark (2019), a few Planeswalkers mark their return in Zendikar Rising. This includes Nissa Revane and Nahiri, both natives of Zendikar, and Jace, who is from Vryn and who once was the Living Guildpact of Ravnica.

== Mechanics ==
Zendikar Rising introduces the new Party mechanic which is themed around the idea of classic adventuring parties. This mechanic "can appear on creatures, instants, sorceries and more. A full party consists of a Cleric, a Rogue, a Warrior and a Wizard, which provides a little bit of everything a balanced adventuring squad needs".

The returning mechanics from previous Zendikar sets are Kicker and Landfall. When the Kicker cost is paid, "a spell can become stronger". Landfall generates a bonus for the player when they put "lands onto the battlefield from anywhere. [...] And for the first time, landfall appears on a planeswalker: Nissa of Shadowed Boughs".

The Zendikar Rising set also "introduced modal double-faced cards". Louis Kemner, for CBR, explained that modal means "either side can be used from the hand, but once a side is chosen, the player is committed to that side. So far, every single modal double-faced card has a spell on one side and a simple land on the other [...]. The idea is that, while in the hand or deck, these cards can be either a much-needed land or a spell at the right time".

== Reception ==
Louis Kemner, for CBR, highlighted the new party mechanic where "cards with the party mechanic either scale up in effect or become cheaper as the party's numbers grow. [...] Double-faced cards also make their return, but they do not have the transform mechanic from the Innistrad sets or Magic Origins. Instead, these cards are modal". Kemner also wrote that "by now, Wizards of the Coast has figured out which mechanics were popular and effective during their time and which weren't. This means it can elegantly bring back fan-favorites in just the right sets for nostalgia and flavorful gameplay alike". In a separate article comparing it to the Battle for Zendikar (2015) set, Kemner highlighted that the Zendikar Rising set had memorable mechanics such as the returning Landfall mechanic, "along with the innovative Party concept, creating in-game groups of Wizards, Clerics, Rogues and Warriors in all five colors for various benefits; it was almost like a built-in Dungeons & Dragons game. Adding modal double-faced cards with lands on the back sides was yet another remarkable innovation, not to mention the return of kicker and cheap, colored Equipment cards". Kemner commented that "the Zendikar Rising set is truly a return to the wild world of adventure and peril, and that's how it was marketed from the very start. Magic fans were thrilled, and sure enough, this standalone set's mechanical identity and lore perfectly fit what made the original Zendikar block so special. [...] All this compares favorably to the Battle for Zendikar block, which was only about fighting the Eldrazi".

Alexander Sowa, also for CBR, highlighted the return of corresponding fiction with the Zendikar Rising set. Sowa wrote that many Magic novels "were widely panned, with Greg Weissman's War of the Spark: Ravnica being infamous among fans for its misrepresentation of existing characters. It seems Wizards of the Coast listened to the protestations of their fans, as Zendikar Rising's story is once again being published, this time as short stories on the Magic website. [...] In the Heart of the Skyclave sets up a clear conflict between Nahiri and Nissa, each a representative of a different philosophy when it comes to Zendikar's Roil. Nahiri believes it's essential to preserve the lives of Zendikari above all else, regardless of any damage that might be inflicted on the natural world around them. Nissa stands in contrast as a representative of a new-world idea that would see the citizens of the plane act in harmony with the world around them. Neither side is a one-dimensional villain".

Charlie Hall, for Polygon, highlighted that a new type booster pack was released for this set. Hall commented that Set Boosters "boast a tremendous collection of full-card art and the chance to get up to four Rare cards — including one or more Mythic Rares — inside each pack. [...] The most important thing to know about Set Boosters is that they’re not intended for use in drafting. [...] Set Booster packs are aimed squarely at collectors, and command a premium price tag to match. [...] The first third of the pack is designed as an introduction. [...] Next comes six Common and Uncommon cards that are connected via a similar theme. [...] After those six cards comes what [senior designer Gavin] Verhey refers to as 'the fireworks.' First is a 'head turner' card, curated by the team at Wizards to show off especially good art from the given set of cards. [...] After the head turner is a 'wildcard,' which has a chance of being a Rare. After that is a guaranteed Rare or Mythic Rare and a guaranteed foil card. [...] In 30 packs we came across a grand total of 42 Rares and three Mythic Rares, including a foil planeswalker and a borderless, alternate art planeswalker. There were 35 foils (including four foil lands) in all. Finally, we encountered two gold foil signed pieces of art".
