= Kaldheim =

Magic: The Gathering expansion set

- Released: February 5, 2021
- Designers: Ethan Fleischer (lead)
- Development code: Equestrian
- Expansion code: KHM
← Zendikar Rising	Strixhaven: School of Mages →

Kaldheim is the 86th Magic: The Gathering expansion and is not part of a block. It is set on the plane of the same name. It was released on February 5, 2021. It also became available in MTG Arena on January 28, 2021.

== Setting ==
The new plane of Kaldheim, and the set based around it, is "Viking and Norse mythology-inspired" and has a top-down design where the theme "dictates the set's cards and powers". The plane "is home to elves, dwarves, valkyrie angels, changelings, giants, and Viking-like human berserkers. The set's story sees the planeswalker Kaya visiting the plane as the gods of Kaldheim's realms travel between them to battle for control and influence. But the endless war may come to an end if someone figures out a way to bind their power into a single, powerful weapon".

=== Planeswalkers ===
Comic Book Resources (CBR) highlighted that "Kaya is a ghost assassin planeswalker, and it was she who slew the Ghost Council of the Orzhov Syndicate guild on Ravnica. Now, she is on Kaldheim, and based on the pre-release art, she is taking 'when in Rome' to heart. Already, she is clad in stylish Norse armor that looks light but tough (perfect for an assassin), and she has traded her trademark violet ghost knives for a pair of one-handed battle-axes". Along with Kaya, the tiefling planeswalker Tibalt returns. He is manipulative and has fought with both Chandra Nalaar and Sorin in the past. He is appearing on Kaldheim disguised as Valki, God of lies, with a new dastardly scheme designed to cause chaos.

This set also introduces two new planeswalkers Niko Aris and Tyvar Kell. Niko, who is from the plane of Theros, is the first nonbinary planeswalker. Game designer Chris Mooney said, "when we were developing Niko's origin, we wanted to tell a story that could express the shared experience of non-binary people without focusing on their gender identity. This was partially to ensure Niko was a character that all kinds of people could find relatable, but it was also to ensure that Niko's character was not entirely enveloped by this single aspect of their identity. Our approach was to try and create an origin with a familiar emotional core that we hoped would resonate with non-binary folks". "Tyvar Kell is elf-King Harald’s younger brother and is a very Kaldheim elf—a little hot headed and boastful"; this planeswalker seeks "to unite the feuding Elves of his home plane" in a set with "tribal synergies throughout".

== Mechanics ==
Kaldheim introduced two new mechanics: Boast and Foretell; neither of these mechanics are restricted to a single tribe. CBR highlighted that the Foretell mechanic "seeps into every color of mana, and on Kaldheim, the immediate future is just as much of a battlefield as the present. In the game, both players may have Foretell cards stocked in the exile zone, ready to pounce when the time is right. This deepens the Kaldheim set a great deal; otherwise, it would be almost entirely focused on creature combat and board states, and some players might not like that".

This set also introduces the new Rune card type and marks the return of the God card type.

== Reception ==
Cody Gravelle, for Screen Rant, highlighted the iteration of god cards released in the Kaldheim set. Gravelle wrote, "Theros is perhaps the most memorable set to feature gods because it was centered around them and was the first MTG set to introduce the creature type god to the game, but subsequent sets like Amonkhet and even War of the Spark have also featured designs of deities with god typing. [...] Throughout all of their iterations, though, the gods in Magic: The Gathering have all tried to capture the same kind of feeling: a powerful being, with abilities that outstrip other creatures (without, hopefully, being too strong in actual gameplay) that also feels integral to the world it is located within. [...] That's what makes the Kaldheim gods so exciting: They feel like the first design of god creatures that fully 'get' the world they're located in, showing off their abilities in intriguing ways that embrace the inspirations they're based on. While the Kaldheim MTG god design certainly won't be for everyone, it's a bold direction that's simultaneously made them feel immensely important while maintaining a degree of flexibility other iterations didn't really have".

Louis Kemner, for CBR, commented that this new set is both exciting and complex, however, it "may be too overwhelming for new players to enjoy". He wrote that "it features some strong tribal effects and exciting new gameplay mechanics. New players are encouraged to give it a try, but they should be warned: it'll take some serious effort. [...] It has been pointed out that, on average, the rare and mythic rare cards of Kaldheim have a lot of text on them, and their effects are highly detailed and complex. This leads to intense gameplay that requires the player to track many different factors, and all these moving parts may strain a newer player's abilities. [...] Kaldheim also features the Foretell keyword, which allows the player to "suspend" the card and cast it later, which may remind experienced players of the Morph ability from the Khans of Tarkir set or pre-Modern sets of all kinds. This requires tracking even more information, and that adds to the set's complexity. This set also has many archetypes, some of which are tribe-based and some of which are not. On top of that, this set has the Snow sub-theme". Kemner highlighted that the Kaldheim-themed starter Commander decks are novice friendly, powerful and fun.

Charlie Hall, for Polygon, highlighted that "one of Magic: The Gathering’s most popular formats, Standard play, is also among the most challenging to collect. [...] That churn is what makes the cards fun to collect, but for Magic newcomers or lapsed players, it can also present a huge impediment. That’s why Wizards of the Coast publishes Challenger Decks [...]. Over the last few years, pre-constructed Magic: The Gathering decks have traditionally centered around a given planeswalker, a powerful character from the fiction of that universe. [...] The newest set of cards, Kaldheim launched on Feb. 5 without Planeswalker Decks, offering up pre-constructed Commander decks instead. Challenger Decks are quite a different beast [...]. The strategies that they are built around have been play-tested for months by the community, and they’ve more or less trickled up to become retail products. [...] For less than $30, the publisher says you’ll be able to put up a decent fight at your local game store".
