= Volothamp Geddarm =

Forgotten Realms fictional character

- Forgotten Realms character
- Volo in 5th edition
- Created by: Jeff Grubb

In-universe information
- Race: Human
- Gender: Male
- Class: Wizard
- Alignment: Chaotic good

Volothamp "Volo" Geddarm, created by Jeff Grubb, is a fictional character of the Forgotten Realms campaign setting for the Dungeons & Dragons fantasy role-playing game.

== Origins and publishing history ==
Volo's first appearance was in Forgotten Realms Adventures (1990). Volo was created by Jeff Grubb, a game designer at TSR who collaborated with the Forgotten Realms creator Ed Greenwood.

It is through Volo's perspective that Greenwood authored his detailed Forgotten Realms lore-books of the Volo's Guide series: Volo's Guide to Waterdeep (1993), Volo's Guide to the North (1993), Volo's Guide to the Sword Coast (1994), Volo's Guide to Cormyr (1995), Volo's Guide to the Dalelands (1996), Volo's Guide to All Things Magical (1996), Volo's Guide to Baldur's Gate II (2000) and Volo's Guide to Monsters (2016). Shannon Appelcline, author of Designers & Dragons, commented that "Greenwood enjoyed writing these books in part because he got to use an unreliable narrator" with Greenwood stating "that this allowed him to create details without worrying about contradicting the readers' own campaigns". Appelcline also noted that "the idea of Volo always getting in trouble for what he writes is a long-running joke that carries through all the Guides".

== Fictional description ==
Volo is a too-curious-for-his-own-good travelling scholar and minor wizard. Always on the lookout for an exposé, he was frequently at odds with Elminster, who preferred some things to be kept in the dark. It was the assembling of his "first" guide—Volo's Guide to All Things Magical—that put him on the "path" to making his other guides. As for Elminster, it is he who edits every guide that Volo has published, as evident in the many footnotes in each, including Volo's Guide to All Things Magical, which almost got Volo killed making it.

"Volo" is not to be confused with "Marcus Volo", real name Marcus Wands, of the Wands family of Waterdeep. A trouble-making bard, Wands gained Volothamp's moniker after he stole an artifact from a powerful wizard, and laid the blame on the far more infamous scapegoat of the real Volo. Pursued by the mad mage and his forces, and protected by adventurers hired by his father, Marco came into his own at the finale, when the artifact was revealed as containing a god from another world, who had come to Toril along with Marco's family. The Sunstaffs, as they were known then, had through the generations been destined to keep the god imprisoned, and Marco awakened to his destiny with the help of the adventurers, Volothamp himself, and the gods Tyr, Sune, and Corellon Larethian.

He has also had several adventures of his own, as told in Once Around the Realms and The Mage in the Iron Mask.

== Reception ==
Chroniclers of D&D Michael Witwer and Kyle Newman considered "the great Volo Geddarm" as "one of D&D's most famous" and "most beloved" characters. Trenton Webb, writing for the British magazine Arcane, thought of Volo as "a sort of magically empowered Magenta DeVine".

Paul Pettengale, also writing for Arcane, described him as "a famous AD&D adventurer who, in an effort to help adventurers in Faerûn, has written a number of guides to regions within the Realms. He's one of those characters that everyone's heard about, and one that just about every Dungeon Master must have been tempted to introduce to their campaign at some point or another." Claudio Chianese from Giochi Per Il Mio Computer magazine described the character as "the most multifaceted and entertaining figure of the Forgotten Realms. Explorer of lost lands, writer [...], womanizer and unrepentant trouble seeker". The reviewer saw his function for the role-playing game in contrasting his less-than-reliable view "with that of the serious wizard Elminster" and to "add a touch of comedy".

Cameron Kunzelman of Paste described Volo as a "drunk" Ken Jennings who "really cared about being able to name all the animals of the zoo, and was the sole grantor of Michelin stars across the world". Kunzelman highlighted the mechanical use of Volo as an unreliable narrator – "as a character, Volo is brilliant because he is a device through which the designers of the Forgotten Realms can give Dungeon Masters a set of bounds.[...] That 'thinks he knows' is crucial, because having Volo write the guide means that he can be wrong. From a design perspective, Volo is a way of giving DMs a toolbox that they don't have to be completely adherent to. Whatever Volo thinks or writes can be slightly off the mark. Maybe he only saw a tavern during the daytime. Maybe he cut some corners. Nesting world design within the subjective opinions of an expansive, world-trotting character with a penchant for embellishment solves a lot of problems and generally makes the job of being a DM a little more fun".

== Appearances in other media ==
Volo makes minor appearances in the computer games Baldur's Gate and Baldur's Gate II: Throne of Bhaal, where he appears in taverns near the beginning of each game. In Baldur's Gate II: Throne of Bhaal he informs the player that he is writing a novel chronicling the events of the games and will give the player previews of how he intends to describe your companions in the game. The printed manual for Baldur's Gate and Baldur's Gate II itself also contains annotations supposedly written by Volo (and also by Elminster). Volo also appears in Baldur's Gate 3.

He is also a major character in Neverwinter Nights 2: Storm of Zehir where he acts as narrator and features prominently in the plot itself. He is responsible for inviting the player's party aboard the ship that you begin the game on. The opening and closing sequences are presented in such a way as to imply that the game is one of his books.

Volo was featured as a Magic: The Gathering card among other "Iconic D&D creatures, villains, heroes, and more [which] grace the Adventures in the Forgotten Realms set".

At San Diego Comic-Con 2026, Dark Horse Comics announced a new ongoing series, titled Dungeons & Dragons, scheduled to debut in November 2026. Set in the Forgotten Realms, the series will feature a depowered Mordenkainen attempting to stop a draconic apocalypse while teaming up with other characters, such as Volo and Tasha. It will be written by Jackson Lanzing and Collin Kelly with pencils by Ibraim Roberson, ink by Arabson Oliveira, and colors by Dan Brown.

== See also ==
- List of Forgotten Realms modules and sourcebooks
