= Volo's Guide to the Dalelands =

Role-playing game supplement

- Cover art by Ciruelo Cabral
- Author: Ed Greenwood
- Genre: Role-playing games
- Publisher: TSR
- Publication date: January 1996
- Media type: Softcover pocket book
- Pages: 244
- ISBN: 978-0786904068

Volo's Guide to the Dalelands is an accessory published by TSR in 1996 for the 2nd edition of the fantasy role-playing game Advanced Dungeons & Dragons. It was the fifth in a series of books providing more information about specific regions of the Forgotten Realms.

== Contents ==
Volo's Guide to the Dalelands is a handbook for players who are adventuring in the Dalelands, supposedly written by Volo. In the introduction, Volo explains the scales he uses in his guide: pints and quarts for inns and taverns, coins for prices, and daggers for the danger represented by the various establishments and sites described.

The book then provides details about inns and taverns, sights to see, places of disrepute to avoid, local legends and customs, and ruins the reader might want to explore.

Three appendices present notable personalities of the Dalelands, some magical items specific to the region, and a complete index of the book.

== Publication history ==
TSR released the first products for the Forgotten Realms campaign setting in 1987, and many supplements and adventures followed. In 1992, TSR released the first in a series of "Volo's Guides" pocket books that brought greater detail to specific regions. The fifth in the series, Volo's Guide to the Dalelands, was a 244-page softcover pocket book written by Ed Greenwood, with cover art by Ciruelo Cabral and interior art by Theresa Brandon, Tony Crnkovich, Ned Dameron, and Valerie Valusek. It was published by TSR in 1996.

== Reception ==
In Issue 11 of the British magazine Arcane, Trenton Webb criticized the poetry that begins the book and called the cover art "dreadful", but admitted that "these are functional trappings rather than an honest indication of content". While Webb initially felt that "the Dalelands seem too settled to be worth bothering with", he realized that "this is an illusion - there's intrigue afoot, monsters in the mountains and war around the corner". Webb commented that Volo's journey is "not always an interesting trip, but it's effective at highlighting the sinister via Volo's rating system" and thought that the locations and characters could be dropped into most AD&D campaigns. Webb concluded by giving this book a rating of 6 out of 10, saying, "In revealing its low-level secrets the guide alludes to darker riddles, the effect of which is to pique the interest of the reader in the Dalelands."

In Issue 30 of Australian Realms, Paul Mitting commented, "Although a bit silly in places (I think Ed Greenwood is fixated on wine, women and food... but then aren't most of us?), the depth of detail and plenitude of good solid adventure hooks make it a worthwhile buy for any AD&D referees playing in the Forgotten Realms campaign setting." Mitting concluded, "this book, like the other Volo Guides, wins over the boxed sets in my opinion because all the information is supplied in a cheery, chatty tone without the game statistics and rules that bog down those bigger supplements."
