= Volo's Guide to the Sword Coast =

1994 role-playing game supplement by Ed Greenwood

- Cover art by John and Laura Lakey
- Author: Ed Greenwood
- Genre: Role-playing games
- Publisher: TSR
- Publication date: October 1, 1994
- Pages: 240
- ISBN: 1-56076-904-1

Volo's Guide to the Sword Coast is a supplement about part of the Forgotten Realms published by TSR in 1994 for the 2nd edition of the fantasy role-playing game Advanced Dungeons & Dragons.

== Contents ==
Volo's Guide to the Sword Coast, one of a series of guidebooks written in the voice of inveterate traveller Volothamp "Volo" Geddarm, is a detailed look at the various cities, communities and notable sights along the coast from Daggerford in the north through to Amn in the south, with a special focus on the various taverns that can be found.

Volo uses a rating system of 1 to 5 pipes for inns, 1 to 5 tankards for taverns, 1 to 5 coins for prices, and 1 to 5 daggers for dangerous places.

Several appendices provide further details of notable personalities likely to be encountered, various magical wards used in the area, and new magic items.

Gamemasters can use locations and characters described in the book as a foundation on which to create proper Sword Coast scenarios.

== Publication history ==
TSR first published Forgotten Realms material for the first edition of Advanced Dungeons & Dragons in 1987, and transitioned the Forgotten Realms campaign to the second edition of AD&D in 1989. The campaign was supported by many adventures, novels and supplements, including 1994's Volo's Guide to the Sword Coast, a 248-page softcover pocket book designed by Ed Greenwood, with interior art by Jennell Jaquays (Note: Credited as Paul Jaquays.) and Valerie Valusek, cartography by Dave S. "Diesel" LaForce and cover art by John and Laura Lakey.

== Reception ==
In a list of the Top 20 games and resources for November 1994, White Wolf listed Volo's Guide to the Sword Coast at #13.

== Other recognition ==
A copy of Volo's Guide to the Sword Coast is held in the collection of the Strong National Museum of Play (object 116.607.5).
