= Ikoria: Lair of Behemoths =

Magic: The Gathering expansion set

- Released: April 17, 2020 (Asia); May 15, 2020 (rest of world)
- Size: 274 cards
- Development code: Cricket
- Expansion code: IKO
| ← Theros Beyond Death | Zendikar Rising → |

Ikoria: Lair of Behemoths is a Magic: The Gathering expansion set. It is not part of block. The sets development codename is "Cricket", and its expansion code is IKO. The set was released on April 17, 2020 in Asia and on May 15, 2020 in the rest of the world. The release date of the set was delayed due to the COVID-19 pandemic.

== Themes ==
Ikoria: Lair of Behemoths takes place in a world full of monsters and is about "building your own monsters". The plane of Ikoria "combines elements of Shards of Alara and Zendikar (and a bit of Khans of Tarkir) while adding its own spin for a unique identity. [...] This plane is largely untamed and home to strong mana and it is divided into five biomes. Humanity is on the fringes, living in a few fortress-like cities or living in rugged survivalist camps, Zendikar-style. Ikoria's wild terrain is dominated by the monsters, who rampage unchecked. [...] In terms of both the lore and the cards, humans are on the fringes and the best they can do is either try to tame the smaller beasts or simply stay out of their way. [...] The civilized beings are more prey than predator and they have to learn to live in a world that doesn't favor them".

This set has a bottom-up design "with a flexible and popular theme: multicolor matters"; "the bottom-up design model takes place when Wizards decides on a mechanical theme for the set (usually a broad one) and designs an in-universe setting with that gameplay theme in mind. [...] Ikoria: Lair of Behemoths also focused on wedges, but in the lore, this was a world of giant mutant monsters, not feuding clans".

== Mechanics ==
Ikoria: Lair of Behemoths introduced a new keyword called mutate. You can mutate a creature you control with mutate by paying the stated cost, and then placing the card either below or above any other creature that isn't a Human. Dot Esports highlighted that "Ikoria is all about monsters and that means the mechanics complement big creatures. In this set, you’ll be able to befriend monsters with companion, change monsters by mutating them or giving them new keywords, and even exchange them for value using cycling".

== Reception ==
Louis Kemner, for CBR, highlighted that the Ikoria: Lair of Behemoths set "is not unlike Zendikar and the shards of Alara, with some elements of Tarkir thrown in. It's a wedge-based, wild world of beasts, powerful magic and humanity's struggle to either tame or survive these monsters. This translates into some interesting mechanics and cycles in this set. [...] Many Mutate creatures have abilities that trigger when the creature mutates, and a given creature can have more than one Mutate card under it, building up a whole list of abilities. Humans cannot mutate, but any other creature is fair game, and a creature with mutate may enter the battlefield normally and have a different Mutate creature enhance it. [...] The Cycling ability is an old one dating back to before the Modern card frames (2003). But Cycling has appeared many times for good reasons: it's flexible and effective".

In April 2020, Zvi Moshowitz, for CoolStuffInc, wrote "I hate Ikoria: Lair of Behemoths. This set is an abomination. [...] Rather than admit Throne of Eldraine pushed too far, power levels (even ignoring companions) continue to be pushed in ways that will damage the long term interests of the game on all fronts. [...] Everything has tons of text and is trying to do everything at once, complexity is super high, all the power is focused on higher rarities and is essentially screaming at us. The set's themes are mutation, humans and nonhumans, companions, wedges, ability counters and cycling. Sam Black [of Star City Games] says that companions are the worst mechanic for the health of Magic since Phyrexian mana. I think this is being unfair to Phyrexian mana. [...] I intentionally didn't focus much on companions during the main part of the set review, because I hold out hope that the companions won't be with us for too long. Or that if that doesn't happen, that there will be new companions, so we should think about cards with less of a focus on the companions on offer now. In the short term, it's going to be very tough to not run a companion".

In June 2020, Charlie Hall, for Polygon, commented that the new companion type of card introduced in this set was essentially nerfed "just a few weeks after they were released [...] in an attempt to restore more balance to the game. Unlike the vast majority of cards in Magic, companions are played from a subset of cards called the 'sideboard.' The sideboard is a small collection of cards that players use in organized play to augment their deck across multiple rounds. Previously, companions could be cast (brought into play) directly from the sideboard. [...] Wizards changed that mechanic. As of June 1, players will need to spend mana to move companions into their hand. Once in their hand, only then can they be brought into play. [...] This is a notable deviation for Wizards. Traditionally the developers and publishers of Magic simply ban individual cards from individual formats of play. A rules change — especially to a new type of card that has only been out for a few weeks — is therefore highly unusual".
