= Magic: The Gathering rules =

Overview of game play of Magic: The Gathering

The rules of the collectible card role-playing game Magic: The Gathering were originally developed by the game's creator, Richard Garfield, and accompanied the first version of the game in 1993. The game's rules have frequently been changed by the manufacturer Wizards of the Coast, mostly in minor ways, but several major rule changes have also been implemented.

In its most-played form, Magic is a game in which two players play each other using their own deck of cards. Players start by drawing a hand of seven cards and then take turns. In a turn, a player can play one card that produces resources (termed "mana"), play spells that require varying amounts and colors of mana, and attack their opponent to reduce their life total from the starting point of 20 to zero, and thus winning the game.

== Overview ==
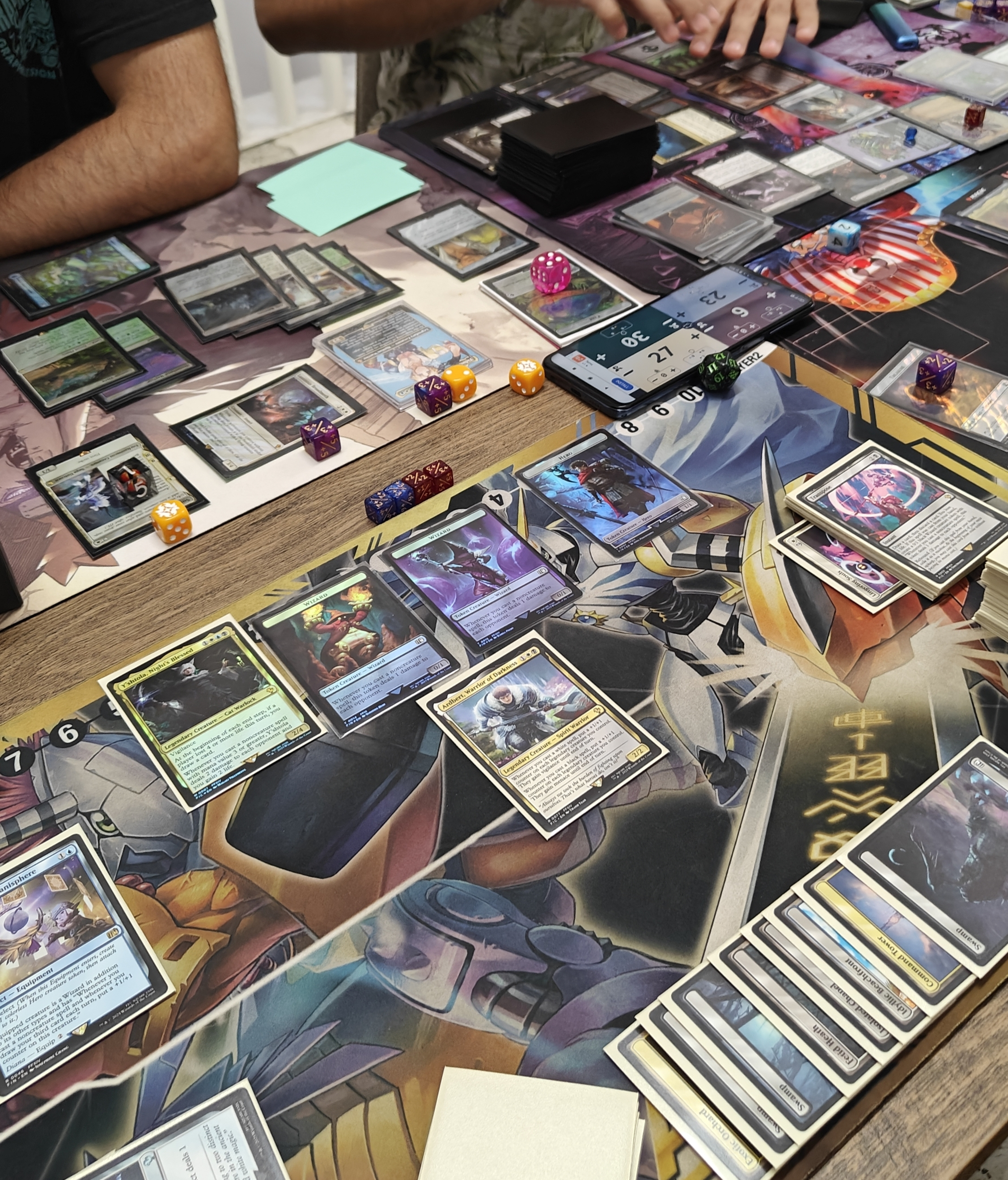
A game of Magic in progress

A typical game of Magic involves two or more players who are engaged in a battle, acting as powerful wizards known as Planeswalkers. Each player has their own deck of cards, purchased and constructed from a limited pool of available cards. A player typically starts the game with a "life total" of twenty and loses the game when the total is reduced to zero. A player can also lose the game if they try to draw from an empty deck. Some cards specify other ways to win or lose the game. One of the "Magic Golden Rules" is: "Whenever a card's text directly contradicts these rules, the card takes precedence". According to CNET, the game has many variants; "Magic tends to embrace all that house ruling, making it official when it catches on. Commander started as a fan-created format, after all."

=== Formats ===
Magic can be played in various formats; each format provides additional rules for deck construction and gameplay, with many confining the pool of permitted cards to those released in a specified group of Magic card sets. There are two main categories mandated by the Wizards Play Network (WPN): Tournament and Casual. The term "sanctioned" refers to formats the WPN allows to be run at official events. Officially sanctioned events can add additional rules, such as the disallowance of proxy cards.

Players have also invented alternative formats for playing the game, some of which Wizards of the Coast has accepted. Some of these formats use rules or sets of cards that differ from those used in sanctioned tournament play. One of the most popular formats of Magic is Commander, which is a casual sanctioned format.

Formats can be further divided into Constructed and Limited formats. Constructed formats require decks to be made prior to participation; players are allowed to use any tournament-legal cards they possess. Sanctioned Constructed formats include Standard, Modern, Legacy, and Vintage. Limited formats, in contrast, use a restricted and unknown pool of cards that is usually formed by opening Magic products. Limited competition requires players to select cards and build decks during the tournament. The primary two sanctioned Limited formats are Sealed Deck and Booster Draft.

=== Deck construction ===
Deck construction requires strategy; players must choose cards to play from thousands of options, requiring players to evaluate the power of their cards, the possible synergies between them, and their possible interactions with the cards they expect to play against. This "metagame" can vary by location and time period. The player restricts the choice of cards by deciding which colors to include in the deck. Starter decks, which are part of the Magic product line, are aimed at giving novice players ideas for deck construction. Players expand their card library for deck construction through booster packs, which have a random distribution of cards from a specific Magic set and are defined by rarity. These rarities are known as Common, Uncommon, Rare, and Mythic Rare; more powerful cards are generally more rare.

== Initial setup ==
=== Beginning and ending the game ===
Each player uses their own deck to play the game. In most formats, a deck must have a minimum of 60 cards; there is no maximum deck size. Some formats have exceptions or additional limitations to these rules. In tournaments, players may be allowed to use a sideboard containing up to 15 cards that can be swapped for cards in the main deck in between games.

At the beginning of a game, each player shuffles their deck and draws seven cards to form their starting hand. The players may choose to mulligan if they do not like their starting hand.

A player wins the game by eliminating all opponents. Players typically begin the game with 20 life and generally lose when their life-total reaches zero or they run out of cards in their deck, although there are other ways of losing the game.

==== London Mulligan ====
The London Mulligan rule was implemented for all competitive Magic formats in 2019. In turn order, each player may decide to mulligan; that player shuffles their hand and library together, and draws a new hand of seven cards. A player can do this as many times as they wish. They then put a card on the bottom of their library for each time they took a mulligan.

=== Zones ===
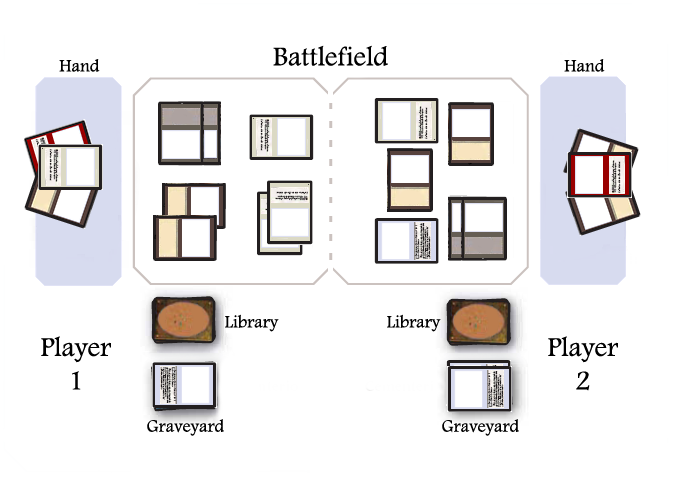
Magic: The Gathering zones.

At any one time, every card is located in one of the following "zones":

- Library: The portion of the player's deck that is kept face down and is normally in random order (shuffled).
- Hand: A player's hidden hand of cards that can be played. If a player has more than seven cards in hand at the end of their turn, any extras must be discarded.
- Battlefield: Cards that are in play and actively influencing the game.
- Graveyard: A player's discard pile. Typically, "creatures, enchantments, and artifacts stay on the playing field whereas sorceries and instants are placed in your discard pile ... after casting their one-time effect".
- The stack: This is the place for spells and abilities that have been cast or played, but have not yet resolved.
- Exile: Cards that have been exiled by specific effects are put here. Unlike the graveyard, exile is "the place where cards go when they're really dead and can't be replayed back into the game".
- Command: In the Commander format, each player's commander is put here at the start of the game and returns when it leaves the battlefield.

== Terminology ==
=== Abilities ===
Types of abilities include:

- Activated abilities have a cost and an effect, which are separated using a colon. A player may activate such an ability at any time by paying the cost.
- Triggered abilities begin with the word "when", "whenever" or "at". The ability is put on the stack when the trigger event occurs.
- Static abilities are written as statements that modify the rules of the game.

==== Keyword abilities ====
Some cards, which are called "keyword abilities", have abilities that are not fully explained on the card and consist of a word or phrase whose meaning is defined in the rules. Keyword abilities are usually given reminder text in the set in which they are introduced. There are over forty such abilities. In most cases, multiple instances of the same keyword on an object have no additional effect. Keywords can be classified as Evergreen and Mechanics. Evergreen keywords "can appear in absolutely any set, since its gameplay effects and flavor are flexible and generic enough to fit anywhere. Effects like trample, flying, deathtouch, first strike and haste are examples of this". Abilities classified as Mechanics are rotated in and out of the game as expansions are released. According to Game Rant: "most planes have some unique rules that are only relevant on cards from specific sets" and "new mechanics are constantly added to shake things up and give the players new tools to work with".

=== Mana ===
When a player uses an ability that produces mana, that mana is put in their "mana pool". Mana can be white, blue, black, red, green or colorless. Mana in the mana pool can be used to pay costs.

=== Types of cards ===
Layout of a Magic: The Gathering card.

All objects that remain on the battlefield are called permanents, types of which include lands, creatures, enchantments, artifacts, and planeswalkers. Sorceries and instants go to the graveyard immediately after they are used.

==== Lands ====
Land cards tap to produce mana that is used to cast spells and activate abilities. They cost no mana to play but a player may play no more than one land per turn, and only during the main phases of their own turn. There are six types of basic lands; Plains, Island, Swamp, Mountain, Forest, and Wastes, one for each color plus Wastes for colorless. These lands can each be tapped to produce one mana of the appropriate color (colorless is not a color as defined by the rules). Other lands are non-basic and may produce other combinations or amounts of mana, or may have other abilities. Playing a land does not use the stack and therefore occurs immediately and no player can stop it. Players are allowed to have any number of basic lands in a deck, whereas all other cards are limited to four copies per deck.

==== Creatures ====
Creatures represent people or beasts that are summoned to the battlefield to attack opposing creatures or players and defend their controller from attacks by enemy creatures. Creatures have two values that represent their strength in combat; these are printed on the card's lower right-hand corner. The first number is the creature's power, the amount of damage it causes in combat. The second number is its toughness; if it receives that much damage in a single turn, the creature is destroyed and placed in the graveyard. Creatures are divided into creature types, such as "goblin" or "wizard". Creatures of the same type often synergize well with each other, causing players to build decks based entirely on one type of creature.

==== Enchantments ====
Enchantments represent persistent magical effects; they are spells that remain on the battlefield and alter some aspect of the game. Some enchantments are attached to other cards on the battlefield—often creatures); these are known as Auras. These enchantments affect that card in some way, and are automatically put into the graveyard when the card they are enchanting leaves the battlefield.

==== Artifacts ====
Artifacts represent magical items, animated constructs, pieces of equipment, or other objects and devices. Like enchantments, artifacts remain on the battlefield until something removes them. Some artifacts are Equipment. Each equipment has a Equip cost; a player can pay to give that equipment to one of their creatures, strengthening the creature. Unlike Auras, which are destroyed when the object they are enchanting leaves play, equipment can be re-equipped by another creature if its original user leaves play.

==== Sorceries and instants ====
Sorceries and instants represent one-shot or short-term magical spells. They never enter the battlefield but take effect and are immediately put into their owner's graveyard. Sorceries and instants differ only in the time they can be cast. Sorceries may only be cast during the player's own main phases, and only when the stack is empty. Instants can be cast at any time, including during other players' turns and while another spell or ability is waiting to resolve.

==== Interrupts ====
Prior to the introduction of the stack in the 6th Edition, there was another type of spell called an "Interrupt". Interrupts functioned similarly to instants; they could be played at any time but players could only respond to interrupts with other interrupts and could not use instants or activate abilities.

==== Planeswalkers ====
According to Magic lore, the player is a planeswalker, a wizard who can travel between different realms or universes (planes); as such, planeswalker cards represent scaled-down versions of other players, whose decks are represented by the card's abilities. Planeswalker cards were originally designed to move autonomously through a roster of effects without player control. Most planeswalkers are legendary and subject to the "legend rule"; if a player controls more than one legendary planeswalker with the same name, that player chooses one and puts the other into their owner's graveyard.

Planeswalkers' abilities are based on their loyalty, which is tracked with counters. Planeswalkers' loyalty abilities each have a positive or negative loyalty cost that denotes the number of counters that must be added (if positive) or removed (if negative) to activate that ability. Regardless of the loyalty costs, a single planeswalker may use only one loyalty ability once per turn, and only on its controller's turn during their main phases. Loyalty counters equal to any damage the planeswalker takes are also removed. A planeswalker with no loyalty counters, either through use of its abilities or through damage, is put into the player's graveyard.

Planeswalkers are not creatures so they cannot directly attack or block. Creatures can attack an opponent's planeswalkers rather than the opponent themself. Those creatures may be blocked normally but if not blocked, they damage the planeswalker instead of the player.

== Gameplay ==
=== Phases ===
Magic officially labels its gameplay phases as "Begin, Main Phase, Combat, Second Main Phase, and End".

==== Begin ====
The beginning phase has three parts:

- Untap step: a player untaps all of the cards they control.
- Upkeep step: then, any abilities that trigger on the "upkeep step" happen, starting with the player of the current turn. These often include cards that require mana payments at every turn.
- Draw step: a player then draws a card. In two-player games, the player who takes the first turn does not draw a card for that turn.

No cards or abilities can be played during the untap step. During the upkeep and draw steps, players can cast instants and activate abilities as normal.

==== Main ====
The main phase occurs immediately after the draw step; in this phase, the player can put cards onto the field. They may play any card from their hand, unless that card specifies otherwise, providing they have enough mana to pay for its casting; this includes creature, planeswalker, sorcery, instant, land, enchantment, and artifact cards. Players may play only one land per turn.

==== Combat ====
The combat phase has five steps. Players may not cast spells during combat, except for instants, activated abilities, and spells that are noted as being able to be played at any time (e.g., creatures with flash). Multiple creatures may attack at the same time but the turn player may declare their list of attackers only once.

- Beginning of combat: players may cast spells and activate abilities that may alter the progress of combat. As the most common example, only untapped creatures may attack, so the defending player may cast instants or activate abilities that will tap a creature, preventing it from attacking.
- Declare attackers: the player whose turn it is declares which creatures they control will attack. Both players may cast instants and activate abilities after attackers have been declared.
- Declare blockers: the defending player chooses creatures with which they will block. A blocking creature must be untapped. Each creature can block only one attacker, but multiple defending creatures can block the same attacker. Both players may cast instants and activate abilities after blockers have been declared.
- Combat damage: attacking and blocking creatures deal damage. If a creature has multiple blockers, that creature’s controller chooses the order in which they are damaged.
- End of combat: nothing normally happens during this phase, although players have another opportunity to act.

==== Second main phase ====
The second main phase is identical to the first; the player may cast spells and play a land if they have not already played one.

==== End ====
The ending phase has two steps:

- End step: abilities that trigger "at the beginning of the end step" go on the stack. This is the player's last chance to cast instants or activate abilities this turn.
- Cleanup: the active player discards down to their maximum hand size, then simultaneously all damage marked on permanents is removed and all "until end of turn" and "this turn" effects end. Players can only act during the cleanup step in the rare event an ability triggers.

After this phase is completed, the next active player starts their turn at the beginning phase.

=== Paying costs ===
==== Tapping and untapping ====
The tap symbol, which appears on cards to indicate that a certain skill requires the card's tap to be used. This is the first version of the symbol, printed on cards from the Revised Edition to Fallen Empires.

Some spells and abilities require the player to tap a permanent as part of their cost, meaning they cannot use the ability again for the remainder of the turn. This is represented by turning the card sideways. A creature that attacks is also tapped but a creature that blocks is not. A tapped creature cannot be declared as an attacker or blocker.

At the beginning of each player's turn, the player untaps all cards they control, unless otherwise stated by a card's effect, and they can again be tapped as normal.

==== Mana costs and colors ====
Most cards other than lands, when cast as a spell, incur a mana cost. Cards may require mana of any color or combination of colors, including generic costs that can be paid with mana of any color.

Screen Rant commented:

One of the more important aspects of constructing a deck is the mana ratio. This ratio determines how many basic land cards players will need in their deck in order to 'cast' spell cards for combat and defense when playing a game. Too much mana can lead to players becoming 'mana swamped' or pulling out mostly basic mana cards and not enough spell cards to attack. The opposite can also happen where players become 'mana starved' and have too little mana to play their spell cards. ... There are a number of ways the calculate or estimate this more specifically, but a quick rule of thumb is that basic mana should make up approximately one-third of their Magic: The Gathering deck, or 20 to 24 cards in a 60-card deck.

== Timing ==
When a player casts a spell or activates an ability, it does not immediately take effect. The card is placed on the stack, allowing other players to respond to the spell. Instant spells and most activated abilities can be used as responses in this manner on any players' turn. Each new spell or ability is put on top of the stack, with the newest on top and the oldest at the bottom. When no player has more spells or abilities to add, spells and abilities on the stack resolve in top-to-bottom order.

Certain spells allow a player to counter other spells. These spells must be cast while the spells they will affect are still on the stack. If a spell is countered, it is moved from the stack to its owner's graveyard and does not resolve. Playing lands and certain other special actions immediately take effect and do not use the stack.

== History ==
Magic's Comprehensive Rules aim to "stabilize the rules" with errata and outline "special-case rulings". In April 1994, Wizards of the Coast attempted to simplify and formalize Magic rules with the Revised Edition card set. This codification of rules streamlined many cards, introduced or clarified many terms, removed "the need for multiple artifact types" and "introduced the tap symbol". It also introduced the "last-in first-out" (LIFO) timing system that in a similar form is still used in the game today, instead of spells being simultaneously resolved as they were in earlier editions. Spells were now announced in batches. During the next year it became clear to Wizards of the Coast the game needed a more-detailed rulebook, leading to the development of the Comprehensive Rules, which were introduced in mid-1995 with the Fourth Edition card set.

The Comprehensive Rules were again revised for the 1997 Fifth Edition card set. The Fifth Edition rules attempted to create a complete rulebook from which card interactions could be logically determined without the need for special-case rulings. According to Dan Grey: "Fifth Edition rules changed interrupts to work remarkably like instants, simplified the attack, and introduced several 'new' concepts that had never had formal names (including phase costs and triggered abilities)". Fifth Edition also introduced on-card reminder text to keywords to help beginners to more easily learn the game's keywords. The rules were more-drastically revised for the Classic Sixth Edition core set in 1999. Instead of spells resolving in complete batches, players could now interact on the stack at any point, interrupts were removed from the game, combat damage used the stack, and the rules deactivating tapped artifacts and preventing tapped blockers from dealing damage were removed. The rules text on the cards was made more consistent, with some rules templated to achieve consistency.

The next major rules update occurred with the Magic 2010 core set. Several rule changes were made to make the game terminology more flavorful, such as renaming the "in play-zone" to "battlefield". The main change was combat no longer using the stack, a change many veterans of the game considered reduced the strategic depth of combat situations, although it was generally accepted in many cases the change would not affect the combat situation.

=== Banned and restricted cards ===
In the event individual cards are listed as "restricted", only one copy can be included in a deck; other cards are "banned" at WPN's discretion. These restrictions are usually imposed for balance-of-power reasons but have been occasionally made because of gameplay mechanics. For example, with the elimination of the "play for ante" mechanic in all formal formats, all cards with this feature were banned. During the COVID-19 pandemic, which drew more players to the online Magic games and generated volumes of data of popular deck constructions, Wizards of the Coast was able to track popular combinations more quickly than in a purely paper game, and in mid-2020, the company banned additional cards that in specific combinations could draw out games far longer than desired.

Wizards of the Coast has banned some old cards from all formal play due to inappropriate racial or cultural depictions in their text or illustrations in the wake of the George Floyd protests, and their images have been blocked or removed from online Magic databases. This includes a card called "Invoke Prejudice", which was displayed on the official card-index site Gatherer "at a web URL ending in '1488', numbers that are synonymous with white supremacy".
