= Magic: The Gathering Pro Tour season 2016–17 =

2016–17 Pro Tour season
- Pro Player of the Year: (Brazil) Paulo Vitor Damo da Rosa
- World Champion: (United States) Brian Braun-Duin
- Pro Tours: 4
- Grands Prix: 49
- Hall of Fame inductions: (Japan) Yuuya Watanabe (United States) Owen Turtenwald
- Start of season: 13 August 2016
- End of season: 30 July 2017

The 2016–17 Pro Tour season was the twenty-second season of the Magic: The Gathering Pro Tour. It started on 13 August 2016 with Grand Prix Portland and Rimini and ended on 30 July 2017 with the conclusion of Pro Tour Kyoto. The season consisted of 49 Grand Prix and 4 Pro Tours, located in Honolulu, Dublin, Nashville, and Kyoto.

== Grand Prix ==
GP Portland (13–14 August 2016)

- Format: Standard
- Attendance: 1712
1. (United States) Robert Santana
2. (United States) Travis Woo
3. (United States) Tanner Von Difloe
4. (United States) Max Mick
5. (United States) Chris Botelho
6. (United States) Oliver Tomajko
7. (United States) Paul Rietzl
8. (United States) Michael Hantz

GP Indianapolis (27–28 August 2016)

- Format: Modern
- Attendance: 1983
1. (United States) Brandon Burton
2. (United States) Rob Pisano
3. (United States) Scott Lipp
4. (United States) Brandon Semerau
5. (United States) Ryan Normandin
6. (United States) Mason Linne
7. (Canada) Ryan Solave
8. (United States) Brandon Pascal

GP Rimini (13–14 August 2016)

- Format: Standard
- Attendance: 878
1. (Germany) Arne Huschenbeth
2. (Czech Republic) Petr Sochurek
3. (Belgium) Simon Enckels
4. (Italy) Marco Dolazza
5. (Czech Republic) Lukas Blohon
6. (Japan) Shouta Yasooka
7. (Czech Republic) Jaroslav Boucek
8. (Austria) Thomas Holzinger

GP Guangzhou (27–28 August 2016)

- Format: Modern
- Attendance: 946
1. (Singapore) Albertus Law
2. (Hong Kong) Wu Kon Fai
3. (Singapore) Lim Zhong Yi
4. (Singapore) Kelvin Chew
5. (China) Jia Hao
6. (Japan) Ryoichi Tamada
7. (Japan) Kentaro Yamamoto
8. (Japan) Keita Kawasaki

GP Lille (27–28 August 2016)

- Attendance: 1818
- Format: Modern
1. (Poland) Meciek Berger
2. (Netherlands) Thomas Hendriks
3. (Czech Republic) Jiří Obraz
4. (Switzerland) Serafin Wellinger
5. (France) Mike Boulinguiez
6. (Germany) André Metzger
7. (Germany) Manuel Menges
8. (Spain) Danel Ballestin

== Magic: The Gathering World Championship ==
Seattle (1–4 September 2016)

- Prize pool: $250,000
- Format: Booster Draft, Standard, Modern

=== Top 4 playoff ===
Semifinals
1	Brian Braun-Duin	3
4	Shouta Yasooka	0
2	Márcio Carvalho	3
3	Oliver Tiu	1

Finals
Brian Braun-Duin	3
Márcio Carvalho	1

=== Final standings ===
The following twenty-four players received an invitation to the 2016 World Championship due to their performance in the 2015–16 season. They are ordered according to the final standings of the event.

#	Player	Prize	Pro points	Qualified due to
1	(United States) Brian Braun-Duin	$70,000	14	2015–16 Grand Prix Player of the Year
2	(Portugal) Márcio Carvalho	$40,000	11	Draft Master
3	(United States) Oliver Tiu	$20,000	9	Constructed Master
4	(Japan) Shouta Yasooka	$20,000	9	Most Pro Points Asia-Pacific
5	(Czech Republic) Lukas Blohon	$10,000	9	Pro Tour Eldritch Moon winner
6	(United States) Luis Scott-Vargas	$10,000	9	Outstanding Hall of Famer
7	(United States) Jiachen Tao	$10,000	8	Pro Tour Oath of the Gatewatch winner
8	(United States) Seth Manfield	$10,000	8	2015 World Champion
9	(Brazil) Thiago Saporito	$5,000	8	2nd Most Pro Points Latin America
10	(United States) Steve Rubin	$5,000	7	Pro Tour Shadows over Innistrad winner
11	(United States) Mike Sigrist	$5,000	7	5th Most Pro Points of otherwise unqalified
12	(United States) Reid Duke	$5,000	7	4th Most Pro Points North America
13	(United States) Brad Nelson	$5,000	7	4th Most Pro Points of otherwise unqalified
14	(Sweden) Joel Larsson	$5,000	7	3rd Most Pro Points Europe
15	(Brazil) Paulo Vitor Damo da Rosa	$5,000	7	Most Pro Points Latin America
16	(Japan) Yuuya Watanabe	$5,000	6	2nd Most Pro Points Asia-Pacific
17	(United States) Owen Turtenwald	$2,500	6	2015–16 Player of the Year
18	(Czech Republic) Ondřej Stráský	$2,500	6	2nd Most Pro Points of otherwise unqualified
19	(United States) Samuel Pardee	$2,500	5	Most Pro Points of otherwise unqualified
20	(Italy) Andrea Mengucci	$2,500	5	3rd Most Pro Points of otherwise unqualified
21	(Netherlands) Niels Noorlander	$2,500	5	2015 Magic Online Champion
22	(Japan) Kazuyuki Takimura	$2,500	5	Pro Tour Battle for Zendikar winner
23	(Japan) Ryoichi Tamada	$2,500	4	3rd Most Pro Points Asia-Pacific
24	(Denmark) Martin Müller	$2,500	3	2nd Most Pro Points Europe

== Grand Prix ==
GP Louisville (10–11 September 2016)

- Format: Team Limited
- Attendance: 1383 (461 teams)

1.

(United States) Sam Black
(United States) Matt Severa
(United States) Justin Cohen

2.

(United States) Ben Rubin
(United States) Matthew Boccio
(United States) Tillman Bragg

3.

(United States) Steve Rubin
(Canada) Alexander Hayne
(United States) Mike Sigrist

4

(United States) Paul Rietzl
(United States) Matthew Sperling
(Netherlands) Jelger Wiegersma

GP London (8–9 October 2016)

- Format: Limited
- Attendance: 1663
1. (Portugal) Márcio Carvalho
2. (Hungary) Gabor Kocsis
3. (Wales) Pip Griffiths
4. (England) Neil Rigby
5. (Denmark) Bo Stentebjerg-Hansen
6. (Italy) Federico Del Basso
7. (Denmark) Marcus Hensing
8. (Italy) Riccardo Picciafuochi

GP Kyoto (10–11 September 2016)

- Format: Team Limited
- Attendance: 2334 (778 teams)

1.

(Japan) Yuki Matsumoto
(Japan) Yuuki Ichikawa
(Japan) Kazuyuki Takimura

2.

(Japan) Kitahara Hiroaki
(Japan) Ken Yukuhiro
(Japan) Kentaro Yamamoto

3.

(Japan) Kenta Harane
(Japan) Fumiya Matsumoto
(Japan) Tomonori Hirami

4

(Czech Republic) Tom Ristovsky
(Czech Republic) Petr Sochurek
(Czech Republic) Pavel Matousek

GP Atlanta (8–9 October 2016)

- Format: Limited
- Attendance: 1663
1. (Brazil) Carlos Romão
2. (United States) Cash Turner
3. (United States) Noah Walker
4. (United States) Raymond Perez Jr.
5. (United States) Geddes Cooper
6. (United States) Christopher Fennell
7. (United States) Thien Nguyen
8. (United States) Matt Frank

== Pro Tour Kaladesh ==
Honolulu (14–16 October 2016)

- Prize pool: $250,000
- Format: Standard, Booster Draft

=== Top 8 ===
Quarterfinals Stage 1
1	Makis Matsoukas
Bye
4	Matthew Nass
Bye
5	Carlos Romão	3
8	Joey Manner	1
6	Ben Hull	3
7	Lee Shi Tian	1
Bye
3	Pierre Dagen
Bye
2	Shouta Yasooka

Quarterfinals Stage 2
Makis Matsoukas
Bye
Matthew Nass	0
Carlos Romão	3
Ben Hull	3
Pierre Dagen	0
Bye
Shouta Yasooka

Semifinals
Makis Matsoukas	1
Carlos Romão	3
Ben Hull	1
Shouta Yasooka	3

Final
Carlos Romão	1
Shouta Yasooka	3

=== Final standings ===
Place	Player	Prize	Pro Points	Comment
1	(Japan) Shouta Yasooka	$50,000	31	4th final day, 2nd Pro Tour win
2	(Brazil) Carlos Romão	$20,000	27	2nd final day
3	(Greece) Makis Matsoukas	$15,000	23	Pro Tour debut
4	(Canada) Ben Hull	$15,000	23	Pro Tour debut
5	(France) Pierre Dagen	$10,000	19	2nd final day
6	(United States) Matthew Nass	$10,000	19	
7	(Hong Kong) Lee Shi Tian	$5,000	15	5th final day
8	(United States) Joey Manner	$5,000	15	

=== Pro Player of the year standings ===
Rank	Player	Pro Points
1	(Japan) Shouta Yasooka	44
2	(Brazil) Carlos Romão	35
3	(United States) Reid Duke	26
4	(Portugal) Márcio Carvalho	25
5	(Greece) Makis Matsoukas	23
5	(Canada) Ben Hull	23

== Grand Prix ==
GP Providence (22–23 October 2016)

- Format: Standard
- Attendance: 1180
1. (China) Wang Yichen
2. (United States) Seth Manfield
3. (United States) Jacky Wang
4. (United States) Osyp Lebedowicz
5. (United States) Zachary Kiihne
6. (Canada) Maxim Belanger
7. (United States) Dave Shiels
8. (United States) Ian Bosley

GP Santiago (29–30 October 2016)

- Format: Standard
- Attendance: 1180
1. (Chile) John Chavarria
2. (Brazil) Jonathan Lobo Melamed
3. (Brazil) Eduardo dos Santos Vieira
4. (Brazil) Victor Fernando Silva
5. (Argentina) Luis Salvatto
6. (Chile) Cristian Cespedes
7. (Chile) Ignacio Garcia
8. (Brazil) Marcos Paulo De Jesus Freitas

GP Kuala Lumpur (22–23 October 2016)

- Format: Standard
- Attendance: 769
1. (Japan) Fumiya Matsumoto
2. (Philippines) Mark Lawrence Tubola
3. (Japan) Yuuki Ichikawa
4. (Australia) Anthony Lee
5. (Japan) Yuuta Takahashi
6. (Singapore) Marcus Oh
7. (Malaysia) Au Yong Wai Kin
8. (Japan) Teruya Kakumae

GP Dallas (5–6 November 2016)

- Format: Modern
- Attendance: 2019
1. (United States) Kevin Mackie
2. (United States) Corey Burkhart
3. (Canada) Michael Mei
4. (United States) Alex Mitas
5. (United States) Brian Braun-Duin
6. (United States) Nicolas D'Ambrose
7. (United States) Zach Voss
8. (United States) Phillip Napoli

GP Warsaw (29–30 October 2016)

- Format: Standard
- Attendance: 1112
1. (Lithuania) Gabrielius Kaklauskas
2. (Netherlands) Niels Molle
3. (Switzerland) Andreas Ganz
4. (Italy) Matteo Moure
5. (Czech Republic) Zbysek Panchartek
6. (United States) Ben Stark
7. (France) Julien Stihle
8. (Ukraine) Oleksii Riabokon

GP Rotterdam (12–13 November 2016)

- Format: Team Limited
- Attendance: 2109 (703 teams)

1.

(Spain) Javier Dominguez
(Portugal) Márcio Carvalho
(Argentina) Luis Salvatto

2.

(Netherlands) Frank Karsten
(Netherlands) Brent Vos
(Netherlands) Bas Melis

3.

(France) Raphaël Lévy
(Japan) Tomoharu Saitou
(France) Jérémy Dezani

4.

(Czech Republic) Ondřej Stráský
(Brazil) Paulo Vitor Damo da Rosa
(Israel) Shahar Shenhar

== World Magic Cup ==
Rotterdam (18–20 November 2016)

- Prize pool: $250,000
- Format: Team Constructed, Team Limited

=== Top 8 ===
Quarter-finals
1	Belgium	2
8	Panama	0
4	Australia	1
5	Italy	2
3	Greece	2
6	Ukraine	0
2	Finland	1
7	Belarus	2

Semi-finals
Belgium	2
Italy	0
Greece	2
Belarus	0

Finals
Belgium	0
Greece	2

=== Final standings ===
Place	Country	Player	Prize	Pro Points
1	Greece	Panagiotis Papadopoulos	$12,000	8
1	Greece	Nikolaos Kaponis	$12,000	8
1	Greece	Tziotis Petros	$12,000	8
1	Greece	Bill Chronopoulos	$12,000	8
2	Belgium	Jerome Bastogne	$6,500	7
2	Belgium	Peter Vieren	$6,500	7
2	Belgium	Branco Neirynck	$6,500	7
2	Belgium	Pascal Vieren	$6,500	7
3	Italy	Alessandro Portaro	$4,000	6
3	Italy	Andrea Mengucci	$4,000	6
3	Italy	Mattia Rizzi	$4,000	6
3	Italy	Alessandro Casamenti	$4,000	6
4	Belarus	Hleb Bantsevich	$4,000	6
4	Belarus	Pavel Miadzvedski	$4,000	6
4	Belarus	Ihar Klionski	$4,000	6
4	Belarus	Dmitry Andronchik	$4,000	6

Place	Country	Player	Prize	Pro Points
5	Finland	Matti Kuisma	$2,000	5
5	Finland	Lauri Pispa	$2,000	5
5	Finland	Tuomas Tuominen	$2,000	5
5	Finland	Leo Lahonen	$2,000	5
6	Australia	David Mines	$2,000	5
6	Australia	Garry Lau	$2,000	5
6	Australia	James Wilks	$2,000	5
6	Australia	Ryan Cubit	$2,000	5
7	Ukraine	Iurii Babych	$2,000	5
7	Ukraine	Sergiy Sushalskyy	$2,000	5
7	Ukraine	Artem Fedorchenko	$2,000	5
7	Ukraine	Bogdan Sorozhynsky	$2,000	5
8	Panama	Saul Alvarado	$2,000	5
8	Panama	César Segovia	$2,000	5
8	Panama	Sergio Bonilla	$2,000	5
8	Panama	Manuel Succari	$2,000	5

=== Pro Player of the year standings ===
Rank	Player	Pro Points
1	(Japan) Shouta Yasooka	47
2	(Portugal) Márcio Carvalho	37
3	(Brazil) Carlos Romão	36
3	(Argentina) Luis Salvatto	29
5	(United States) Reid Duke	26
5	(United States) Steve Rubin	26

== Grand Prix ==
GP Chiba (26–27 November 2016)

- Format: Legacy
- Attendance: 2503
1. (Japan) Kentaro Yamamoto
2. (Japan) Atsuki Kihara
3. (Japan) Yuuya Watanabe
4. (Japan) Keisuke Sato
5. (Japan) Kouichi Miyabe
6. (Japan) Ryo Takahashi
7. (Japan) Akira Honma
8. (China) Liu Jin

GP Milwaukee (10–11 December 2016)

- Format: Limited
- Attendance: 1331
1. (United States) Steven Carter
2. (United States) Brandon Fisher
3. (United States) Eric Severson
4. (United States) Evan Petre
5. (United States) Ari Lax
6. (Japan) Toshiya Kanegawa
7. (United States) Benjamin Weitz
8. (United States) Corey Brukhart

GP Prague (28–29 January 2017)

- Format: Limited
- Attendance: 2005
1. (Turkey) Yusuf Kemal Vefa
2. (Brazil) Paulo Vitor Damo da Rosa
3. (Germany) Fabian Friedrich
4. (Finland) Roope Metsä
5. (Denmark) Christoffer Larsen
6. (Slovakia) Ivan Floch
7. (Germany) Florian Koch
8. (Italy) Fabrizio Campanino

GP Denver (3–4 December 2016)

- Format: Standard
- Attendance: 1568
1. (United States) Matt Severa
2. (United States) Steve Rubin
3. (United States) Jacob Nagro
4. (United States) Andrew Wolbers
5. (United States) Rob Pisano
6. (Canada) Ben Hull
7. (United States) Michael Snyder
8. (United States) Seth Manfield

GP Louisville (7–8 January 2017)

- Format: Legacy
- Attendance:1610
1. (United States) Reid Duke
2. (United States) Andrew Sullano
3. (United States) Brian Braun-Duin
4. (United States) Nate Barton
5. (United States) Charles Hinkle
6. (United States) Michael Majors
7. (United States) Cody Napier
8. (United States) Craig Wescoe

GP Madrid (3–4 December 2016)

- Format: Standard
- Attendance: 1456
1. (Italy) Carmine D'Aniello
2. (France) Nicolas Legendre
3. (England) Callum Bousfield
4. (Italy) Marco Cammilluzzi
5. (Spain) Rafael Sarriegui Hidalgo
6. (Spain) Adrian Ramiro Cano
7. (Portugal) Luis Gobern
8. (Germany) Alexander Hottmann

GP San Jose (28–29 January 2017)

- Format: Limited
- Attendance: 1908
1. (United States) John Asbach
2. (United States) Ari Hausman-Cohen
3. (United States) Roberto Berni
4. (United States) Avenash Pernankil
5. (United States) Jiachen Tao
6. (United States) Anand Khare
7. (Canada) Adam Ragsdale
8. (United States) Richard Tan

== Pro Tour Aether Revolt ==
Dublin (3–5 February 2017)

- Prize pool: $250,000
- Format: Standard, Booster Draft

=== Top 8 ===
Quarterfinals Stage 1
Bye
1	Márcio Carvalho
4	Donald Smith
Bye
5	Jan Ksandr	2
8	Paulo Vitor Damo da Rosa	3
6	Martin Jůza	0
7	Eduardo Sajgalik	3
Bye
3	Liu Yuchen
2	Lucas Esper Berthoud
Bye

Quarterfinals Stage 2
Bye
Márcio Carvalho
Donald Smith	3
Paulo Vitor Damo da Rosa	2
Eduardo Sajgalik	3
Liu Yuchen	2
Lucas Esper Berthoud
Bye

Semifinals
Márcio Carvalho	3
Donald Smith	1
Eduardo Sajgalik	2
Lucas Esper Berthoud	3

Final
Márcio Carvalho	2
Lucas Esper Berthoud	3

=== Final standings ===
Place	Player	Prize	Pro Points	Team	Comment
1	(Brazil) Lucas Esper Berthoud	$50,000	31	DEXThird	
2	(Portugal) Márcio Carvalho	$20,000	27	DEX Army	3rd Final day
3	(United States) Donald Smith	$15,000	23	Lingering Souls	
4	(Canada) Eduardo Sajgalik	$15,000	23	MTG Mint Card	2nd Final day
5	(China) Liu Yuchen	$10,000	19		
6	(Brazil) Paulo Vitor Damo da Rosa	$10,000	19	Channel Fireball Ice	11th Final day
7	(Czech Republic) Jan Ksandr	$5,000	15		
8	(Czech Republic) Martin Jůza	$5,000	15	Channel Fireball Fire	3rd Final day

=== Pro Player of the year standings ===
Rank	Player	Pro Points
1	(Portugal) Márcio Carvalho	64
2	(Japan) Shouta Yasooka	52
3	(Brazil) Paulo Vitor Damo da Rosa	48
4	(United States) Reid Duke	40
5	(Canada) Eduardo Sajgalik	39
5	(Brazil) Carlos Romão	39

=== Team Series standing ===
Rank	Team	Members		Pro Points
1	MTG Mint Card	(Hong Kong) Lee Shi Tian	(New Zealand) Jason Chung	49
1	MTG Mint Card	(Taiwan) Huang Hao-Shan	(Singapore) Kelvin Chew	49
1	MTG Mint Card	(Canada) Eduardo Sajgalik	(South Korea) Nam Sung-wook	49
2	Musashi	(Japan) Kentaro Yamamoto	(Japan) Yuuya Watanabe	49
2	Musashi	(Japan) Ken Yukuhiro	(Japan) Yuuki Ichikawa	49
2	Musashi	(Japan) Teruya Kakumae	(Japan) Shouta Yasooka	49
3	Face to Face Games	(Canada) Alexander Hayne	(United States) Samuel Pardee	44
3	Face to Face Games	(United States) Steve Rubin	(Canada) Jacob Wilson	44
3	Face to Face Games	(Slovakia) Ivan Floch	(United States) Oliver Tiu	44
4	DEXThird	(Chile) Felipe Valdivia	(Brazil) Patrick Fernandes	43
4	DEXThird	(Chile) Cristian Cespedes	(Chile) Jose Luis Echeverria	43
4	DEXThird	(Brazil) João Lucas Caparroz	(Brazil) Lucas Esper Berthoud	43
5	Lingering Souls	(United States) Shaheen Soorani	(United States) Chris Fennell	40
5	Lingering Souls	(United States) Travis Woo	(Switzerland) Andreas Ganz	40
5	Lingering Souls	(Germany) Ashraf Abou Omar	(United States) Donald Smith	40

== Grand Prix ==
GP Pittsburgh (11–12 February 2017)

- Format: Standard
- Attendance: 1334
1. (United States) Ryan Hare
2. (United States) Bronson Gervasi
3. Matthew Long
4. (United States) Robert Beatty
5. (United States) Adam Van Fleet
6. (Canada) Daniel Fournier
7. (United States) Anand Khare
8. (United States) Michael Cochran

GP Utrecht (25–26 February 2017)

- Format: Standard
- Attendance: 1232
1. (France) Samuel Vuillot
2. (Italy) Fabrizio Campanino
3. (France) Alexandre Habert
4. (Germany) David Brucker
5. (Netherlands) Charly Traarbach
6. (Denmark) Kasper Nielsen
7. (Germany) Thuan Truong
8. (Turkey) Berk Akbulut

GP Shizuoka (18–19 March 2017)

- Format: Standard
- Attendance: 2719
1. (Japan) Ryohei Kirino
2. (China) Wentao Qi
3. (Japan) Masayasu Tanahashi
4. (Japan) Yusuke Sasabe
5. (South Korea) Sungeun Je
6. (Japan) Takanori Watanabe
7. (Japan) Akihiro Miyamoto
8. (Japan) Motoaki Itou

GP San Antonio (1–2 April 2017)

- Format: Team Unified Modern
- Attendance: 1668 (556 teams)

1.

(United States) Greg Orange
(United States) Adam Jansen
(United States) Andrejs Prost

2.

(United States) Reid Duke
(United States) William Jensen
(United States) Owen Turtenwald

3.

(United States) Gerard Fabiano
(United States) Eli Kassis
(United States) Ben Lundquist

4.

(United States) David Ochoa
(United States) Matt Severa
(United States) Andrew Baeckstrom

GP Bologna (6–7 May 2017)

- Format: Limited
- Attendance: 1669
1. (Italy) Corrado De Sio
2. (Czech Republic) Martin Jůza
3. (Italy) Francesco Giorgiio
4. (Belgium) Pascal Vieren
5. (Switzerland) Dario Veneri
6. (Italy) Dario Parazzoli
7. (Spain) Javier Dominguez
8. (Denmark) Simon Nielsen

GP Vancouver (18–19 February 2017)

- Format: Modern
- Attendance: 1552
1. (United States) Josh Utter-Leyton
2. (Canada) Johnathan Zaczek
3. (United States) Gerry Thompson
4. (United States) Sam Black
5. (United States) Eric Severson
6. (Canada) Jon Stern
7. (Canada) Nathanial Knox
8. (Canada) Jason Simard

GP New Jersey (11–12 March 2017)

- Format: Standard
- Attendance: 1622
1. (United States) Corey Baumeister
2. (United States) Ben Friedman
3. (United States) Paul Rietzl
4. (United States) Ben Stark
5. (United States) Robert Lombardi
6. (United States) Jarvis Yu
7. (United States) Kyle Moran
8. (United States) Brandon Ayers

GP Porto Alegre (18–19 March 2017)

- Format: Standard
- Attendance: 570
1. (Brazil) Victor Silva
2. (Brazil) Vagner William Casati
3. (Peru) Francisco Sifuentes
4. (Brazil) Rafael Bertolli Parra
5. (Argentina) Sebastian Pozzo
6. (Argentina) Luis Salvatto
7. (Chile) Patricio Roman
8. (Brazil) Carlos Alexandre Dos Santos Esteves

GP Mexico City (8–9 April 2017)

- Format: Team Limited
- Attendance: 444 (148 teams)

1.

(United States) Andrew Cuneo
(United States) Eric Froehlich
(United States) Ben Stark

2.

(United States) Matthew Nass
(Canada) Jacob Wilson
(United States) Samuel Pardee

3.

(Japan) Kazuyuki Takimura
(Japan) Shota Takao
(Japan) Toru Inoue

4.

(Canada) Jon Stern
(United States) Greg Ogreenc
(United States) Stephen Neal

GP Beijing (6–7 May 2017)

- Format: Limited
- Attendance: 1029
1. (Singapore) Kelvin Chew
2. (Japan) Keita Kawasaki
3. (Japan) Tomoharu Saito
4. (China) Wu Xuan
5. (Japan) Riku Kumagai
6. (Japan) Takuma Morofuji
7. (China) Yi Shimin
8. (Japan) Riki Kamo

GP Brisbane (18–19 February 2017)

- Format: Modern
- Attendance: 981
1. (Australia) Oliver Oks
2. (New Zealand) Zen Takahashi
3. (Hong Kong) Lee Shi Tian
4. (Australia) Timothy Cheng
5. (New Zealand) Chris Grimshaw
6. (Japan) Tetsu Kawaguchi
7. (New Zealand) Sean Hume
8. (Australia) James Larsen-Scott

GP Barcelona (11–12 March 2017)

- Format: Standard
- Attendance: 1265
1. (Czech Republic) Petr Sochůrek
2. (England) Matthew Pope
3. (Portugal) Márcio Carvalho
4. (Spain) Iñigo Vallejo Pascual
5. (Poland) Michal Lipinski
6. (Italy) Federico Del Basso
7. (Spain) Miguel Castro
8. (France) Yoann Sevaux

GP Orlando (25–26 March 2017)

- Format: Limited
- Attendance: 1284
1. (Sweden) Joel Larsson
2. (United States) Noah Walker
3. (China) Zile Yao
4. (United States) Chris Pikula
5. (Canada) Alexander Hayne
6. (United States) Jack Dobbin
7. (United States) Patrick Tierney
8. (United States) Jorge Mantilla

GP Richmond (6–7 May 2017)

- Format: Limited
- Attendance: 1595
1. (United States) Michael Baraniecki
2. (United States) Eli Kassis
3. (United States) Evan Esposito
4. (Denmark) Martin Dang
5. (United States) Brian Braun-Duin
6. (United States) Brad Carpenter
7. (Brazil) Thiago Saporito
8. (United States) Josh Jones

== Pro Tour Amonkhet ==
Nashville (12–14 May 2017)

- Prize pool: $250,000
- Format: Standard, Booster Draft

=== Top 8 ===
Quarter-finals
1	Chris Fennel	0
8	Yuuya Watanabe	3
4	Christian Calcano	0
5	Martin Müller	3
3	Marc Tobiasch	1
6	Gerry Thompson	3
2	Ken Yukuhiro	3
7	Eric Froehlich	0

Semi-finals
Yuuya Watanabe	3
Martin Müller	0
Gerry Thompson	3
Ken Yukuhiro	1

Finals
Yuuya Watanabe	1
Gerry Thompson	3

=== Final standings ===
Place	Player	Prize	Pro Points	Team	Comment
1	(United States) Gerry Thompson	$50,000	30	Mutiny	2nd Final day
2	(Japan) Yuuya Watanabe	$20,000	26	Musashi	4th Final day
3	(Japan) Ken Yukuhiro	$15,000	24	Musashi	3rd Final day
4	(Denmark) Martin Müller	$12,000	22	Genesis	2nd Final day
5	(United States) Chris Fennel	$10,000	20	Lingering Souls	2nd Final day
6	(Germany) Marc Tobiasch	$9,000	18	EUreka	
7	(United States) Christian Calcano	$7,500	17	MTG Bent Card	
8	(United States) Eric Froehlich	$6,000	16	Channel Fireball Ice	5th Final day

=== Pro Player of the year standings ===
Rank	Player	Pro Points
1	(Portugal) Márcio Carvalho	76
2	(Japan) Shouta Yasooka	64
3	(Japan) Yuuya Watanabe	58
4	(United States) Reid Duke	57
5	(Singapore) Kelvin Chew	54

=== Team Series standing ===
Rank	Team	Members		Pro Points
1	Musashi	(Japan) Kentaro Yamamoto	(Japan) Yuuya Watanabe	119
1	Musashi	(Japan) Ken Yukuhiro	(Japan) Yuuki Ichikawa	119
1	Musashi	(Japan) Teruya Kakumae	(Japan) Shouta Yasooka	119
2	Genesis	(United States) Brad Nelson	(Czech Republic) Lukas Blohon	94
2	Genesis	(United States) Seth Manfield	(United States) Michael Majors	94
2	Genesis	(Denmark) Martin Dang	(Denmark) Martin Müller	94
3	MTG Mint Card	(Hong Kong) Lee Shi Tian	(New Zealand) Jason Chung	88
3	MTG Mint Card	(Taiwan) Huang Hao-Shan	(Singapore) Kelvin Chew	88
3	MTG Mint Card	(Canada) Eduardo Sajgalik	(South Korea) Nam Sung-wook	88
4	Lingering Souls	(United States) Shaheen Soorani	(United States) Chris Fennell	74
4	Lingering Souls	(United States) Travis Woo	(Switzerland) Andreas Ganz	74
4	Lingering Souls	(Germany) Ashraf Abou Omar	(United States) Donald Smith	74
5	Puzzle Quest	(United States) Reid Duke	(United States) Owen Turtenwald	73
5	Puzzle Quest	(United States) William Jensen	(United States) Jon Finkel	73
5	Puzzle Quest	(United States) Andrew Cuneo	(United States) Paul Rietzl	73

== Grand Prix ==
GP Montreal (20–21 May 2017)

- Format: Standard
- Attendance: 850
1. (United States) Kevin Jones
2. (Canada) Paul Dean
3. (Canada) Maxime Aubin
4. (United States) Max McVety
5. (United States) Ethan Gaieski
6. (Canada) Shaun McLaren
7. (Canada) Daniel Fournier
8. (Canada) Liam Kane Meilleur

GP Kobe (27–28 May 2017)

- Format: Modern
- Attendance: 2802
1. (Malaysia) Joe Soh
2. (Japan) Terumasa Kojima
3. (South Korea) Park Bi-o
4. (Japan) Fumiyasu Suzuike
5. (Japan) Tomoya Tsubouchi
6. (Japan) Takeshi Kagawa
7. (Japan) Akio Chiba
8. (Japan) Ryoichi Tamada

GP Las Vegas 1 (15–16 June 2017)

- Format: Legacy
- Attendance: 2656
1. (United States) Andrew Calderon
2. (United States) Jonathan Semeyn
3. (United States) Chris Iaali
4. (United States) Jody Keith
5. (United States) Patrick Tierney
6. (Canada) Samuel Tharmaratnam
7. (United States) Jake Haversat
8. (United States) Daniel Cathro

GP Cleveland (24–25 June 2017)

- Format: Team Limited
- Attendance: 1611 (537 teams)

1.

(United States) Owen Turtenwald
(United States) William Jensen
(United States) Reid Duke

2.

(United States) Corey Burkhart
(Japan) Shuhei Nakamura
(Czech Republic) Martin Jůza

3.

(United States) Nathan Smith
(United States) Brandon Ayers
(United States) John Rolf

4.

(United States) Josh Sellers
(United States) Nick Neill
(United States) Chris Ferber

GP Kyoto (22–23 July 2017)

- Format: Limited
- Attendance: 2398
1. (United States) William Jensen
2. (Japan) Atsuki Kihara
3. (Denmark) Martin Müller
4. (United States) Jon Finkel
5. (China) Qi Wentao
6. (Canada) Pascal Maynard
7. (Canada) Yang Xiao Yu
8. (Japan) Kazuki Yada

GP Santiago (20–21 May 2017)

- Format: Standard
- Attendance: 718
1. (Argentina) Mauro Sasso
2. (Poland) Grzegorz Kowalski
3. (Chile) Daniel Vega
4. (Brazil) Guillherme Merjam
5. (Argentina) Javier Luna
6. (Argentina) Nicolas Epstein
7. (Chile) Ignacio Saez
8. (Netherlands) Niels Noorlander

GP Amsterdam (3–4 June 2017)

- Format: Standard
- Attendance: 1170
1. (Czech Republic) Lukas Blohon
2. (Germany) Benjamin Luft
3. (Australia) Michael Maurici
4. (Netherlands) Arjan van Leeuwen
5. (Netherlands) Jelco Bodewes
6. (Netherlands) Thomas Hendriks
7. (Germany) Alexander Mertins
8. (Germany) Raphael Coors

GP Las Vegas 2 (16–17 June 2017)

- Format: Limited
- Attendance: 2562
1. (Brazil) Thiago Saporito
2. (United States) Steve Rubin
3. (United States) Paul Herr
4. (United States) Samuel Pardee
5. (China) Bolun Zhang
6. (United States) Tzu-Mainn Chen
7. (United States) Andrew Cuneo
8. (United States) Mike Sigrist

GP Sydney (24–25 June 2017)

- Format: Team Limited
- Attendance: 852 (284 teams)

1.

(Australia) James Wilks
(Australia) Simon Linabury
(Australia) Ivan Schroder

2.

(Japan) Yuuya Watanabe
(Japan) Hajime Nakamura
(Japan) Yoshihiko Ikawa

3.

(Australia) Jarron Puszet
(Australia) Dominic Z
(Australia) Karl Lyndon Eyre

4.

(New Zealand) Danny Liao
(New Zealand) Jing-Wei Zheng
(New Zealand) Brandon Wise

GP Copenhagen (27–28 May 2017)

- Format: Modern
- Attendance: 1815
1. (Italy) Mattia Rizzi
2. (Spain) Cristian Ortiz Ros
3. (Denmark) Kim Ströh
4. (Denmark) Martin Müller
5. (Finland) Teemu Halonen
6. (France) Remy Le François
7. (Germany) Michael Steinecke
8. (Germany) Gunnar Geißler

GP Manila (3–4 June 2017)

- Format: Modern
- Attendance: 757
1. (Japan) Ryoichi Tamada
2. (China) Qi Wentao
3. (Philippines) Imman Van Valerio
4. (Malaysia) Wee Pang Ming
5. (Philippines) Cholo Pascual
6. (Philippines) Mark Anthony Biala
7. (Philippines) Rei Anthony Coo
8. (Philippines) Dunstan Tauli

GP Las Vegas 3 (17–18 June 2017)

- Format: Modern
- Attendance: 3264
1. (Canada) Mani Davoudi
2. (France) Theau Mery
3. (United States) Benjamin Coursey
4. (United States) Allen Wu
5. (United States) Matt Sorensen
6. (United States) Craig Wescoe
7. (United States) Daniel Wong
8. (United States) Paul Peterson

GP Toronto (22–23 July 2017)

- Format: Limited
- Attendance: 1395
1. (Canada) Robert Anderson
2. (United States) Allen Sun
3. (United States) Matthew Nickolai
4. (United States) Benjamin Weitz
5. (United States) Andrew Cuneo
6. (Canada) Doug Potter
7. (Canada) Taimur Rashid
8. (China) You Cheng An

== Pro Tour Hour of Devastation ==
Kyoto (27–30 July 2017)

- Prize pool: $250,000
- Format: Standard, Booster Draft

=== Top 8 ===
Quarter-finals
1	Paulo Vitor Damo da Rosa	3
8	Seth Manfield	2
4	Wing Chun Yam	3
5	Shintaro Kurata	1
3	Samuel Black	3
6	Felix Leong	2
2	Samuel Pardee	3
7	Yusuke Sasabe	2

Semi-finals
Paulo Vitor Damo da Rosa	3
Wing Chun Yam	2
Samuel Black	2
Samuel Pardee	3

Finals
Paulo Vito Damo da Rosa	3
Samuel Pardee	2

=== Final standings ===
Place	Player	Prize	Pro Points	Team	Comment
1	(Brazil) Paulo Vitor Damo da Rosa	$50,000	30	Channel Fireball Ice	12th Final day, 2nd Pro Tour win
2	(United States) Samuel Pardee	$20,000	26	Face to Face Games	2nd Final day
3	(United States) Samuel Black	$15,000	24	Mutiny	3rd Final day
4	(Hong Kong) Yam Wing Chun	$12,500	22		
5	(Japan) Shintaro Kurata	$10,000	20		Pro Tour Debut
6	(Singapore) Felix Leong	$9,000	18		
7	(Japan) Yusuke Sasabe	$7,500	17		Pro Tour Debut
8	(United States) Seth Manfield	$6,000	16	Genesis	3rd Final day

=== Team Series standing ===
Rank	Team	Members		Pro Points
1	Musashi	(Japan) Kentaro Yamamoto	(Japan) Yuuya Watanabe	141
1	Musashi	(Japan) Ken Yukuhiro	(Japan) Yuuki Ichikawa	141
1	Musashi	(Japan) Teruya Kakumae	(Japan) Shouta Yasooka	141
2	Genesis	(United States) Brad Nelson	(Czech Republic) Lukas Blohon	131
2	Genesis	(United States) Seth Manfield	(United States) Michael Majors	131
2	Genesis	(Denmark) Martin Dang	(Denmark) Martin Müller	131
3	MTG Mint Card	(Hong Kong) Lee Shi Tian	(New Zealand) Jason Chung	120
3	MTG Mint Card	(Taiwan) Huang Hao-Shan	(Singapore) Kelvin Chew	120
3	MTG Mint Card	(Canada) Eduardo Sajgalik	(South Korea) Nam Sung-wook	120
4	Channel Fireball Ice	(Brazil) Paulo Vitor Damo da Rosa	(United States) Mike Sigrist	117
4	Channel Fireball Ice	(Sweden) Joel Larsson	(United States) Ben Stark	117
4	Channel Fireball Ice	(Czech Republic) Ondřej Stráský	(United States) Eric Froehlich	117
4	MTG Bent Card	(Italy) Andrea Mengucci	(Australia) Anthony Lee	117
4	MTG Bent Card	(Spain) Javier Dominguez	(United States) Christian Calcano	117
4	MTG Bent Card	(Denmark) Michael Bonde	(United States) Corey Baumeister	117

== Pro Player of the Year final standings ==
The 2016–17 Pro Tour season ended after Pro Tour Hour of Devastation. These are the final standings of the Player of the Year race, including every player who at the end of the season reached 52 points (Platinum-level, the highest Pro Club Level).

Place	Player	Pro Points	Place	Player	Pro Points	Place	Player	Pro Points
1	(Brazil) Paulo Vitor Damo da Rosa	85	10	(United States) Owen Turtenwald	62	19	(United States) Christian Calcano	54
2	(Portugal) Márcio Carvalho	81	11	(Singapore) Kelvin Chew	61	19	(United States) William Jensen	54
3	(United States) Reid Duke	74	12	(Hong Kong) Lee Shi Tian	59	21	(United States) Steve Rubin	53
4	(United States) Samuel Pardee	69	13	(United States) Samuel Black	56	21	(Brazil) Thiago Saporito	53
5	(Japan) Shouta Yasooka	68	13	(Japan) Ken Yukuhiro	56	21	(Canada) Eduardo Sajgalik	53
5	(Japan) Yuuya Watanabe	68	13	(United States) Donald Smith	56	21	(United States) Eric Froehlich	53
7	(United States) Seth Manfield	65	16	(Spain) Javier Dominguez	55	25	(Brazil) Carlos Romão	52
8	(Czech Republic) Martin Jůza	64	16	(United States) Gerry Thompson	55			
9	(United States) Brad Nelson	63	16	(Denmark) Martin Müller	55			
