= Magic: The Gathering Pro Tour season 2015–16 =

2015–16 Pro Tour season
- Pro Player of the Year: (United States) Owen Turtenwald
- Rookie of the Year: (United States) Oliver Tiu
- World Champion: (United States) Seth Manfield
- Pro Tours: 4
- Grands Prix: 49
- Hall of Fame inductions: (United States) Eric Froehlich (Japan) Shouta Yasooka (Brazil) Willy Edel
- Start of season: 8 August 2015
- End of season: 7 August 2016

The 2015–16 Pro Tour season was the twenty-first season of the Magic: The Gathering Pro Tour. It started on 8 August 2015 with Grand Prix San Diego and Hong Kong and ended on 7 August 2016 with the conclusion of Pro Tour Sydney. The season consisted of 49 Grand Prix and 4 Pro Tours, located in Milwaukee, Atlanta, Madrid, and Sydney.

== Mode ==
Four Pro Tours and forty-nine Grands Prix were held in the 2015–16 season. These in addition to the World Championship and the World Magic Cup are the events that awarded Pro Points, the points that were used to determine the Player of the Year Standings and Pro Club levels. Players were awarded Pro Levels for earning 18 (Silver level), 33 (Gold), and 50 points (Platinum), however only the six best Grand Prix results counted. Pro Club Levels come with certain benefits such as qualifications to subsequent Pro Tours, byes at Grand Prix, and airfare to Pro Tours. Based on the final standings of Pro Tours, Grand Prix, Worlds, and the World Magic Cup Pro Points are awarded as follows:

Rank	Pro Points awarded at			
Rank	Pro Tour	Grand Prix (individual)	Grand Prix (teams)	World Magic Cup
1	30	8	6	8
2	26	6	5	7
3–4	22	5	4	6
5–8	18	4	—	5
9–16	—	—	—	4
17–32	—	—	—	3
33+	—	—	—	2

For competitors finishing outside the final elimination stage of Grand Prix and Pro Tours points are awarded depending on their score after the final Swiss round. 16 Swiss rounds are played at Pro Tours, 15 at individual Grand Prix, and 14 at Team Grand Prix. Pro Points are then awarded as follows.

Points	Pro Points awarded at		
Points	Pro Tour	Grand Prix (individual)	Grand Prix (teams)
39+	15	4	4
36–38	15	3	4
35	12	2	4
34	11	2	4
33	10	2	3
32	8	1	2
31	7	1	2
30	6	1	1
28–29	4	—	—
0–27	3	—	—

Finally players that participated in the World Championship earned one Pro Point per win in the Swiss Portion and two Pro Points per win in the single elimination stage.

== Grand Prix ==
GP San Diego (8–9 August 2015)

- Format: Standard
- Attendance: 1493
1. (United States) Michael Majors
2. (Brazil) Artur Villela
3. (United States) Paul Rietzl
4. (United States) Paul Yeem
5. (United States) Loren Eakins
6. (United States) Corey Brukhart
7. (United States) Ben Weitz
8. (United States) Dan Ward

GP Detroit (15–16 August 2015)

- Format: Team Limited
- Attendance: 2040 (680 teams)

1.

(United States) Matt Nass
(Canada) Jacob Wilson
(United States) Sam Pardee

2.

(United States) Ben Stark
(United States) Luis Scott-Vargas
(United States) Eric Froehlich

3.

(United States) Owen Turtenwald
(United States) William Jensen
(United States) Reid Duke

4

(United States) Brock Parker
(United States) Matt Costa
(Israel) Shahar Shenhar

GP Hong Kong (8–9 August 2015)

- Format: Limited
- Attendance: 851
1. (Malaysia) Chye Yian Hsiang
2. (Philippines) Jan Ang
3. (Philippines) Victoriano Lim
4. (China) Liu Yuchen
5. (China) Wu Songwei
6. (Hong Kong) Cheung Lap Chung
7. (Hong Kong) Yam Wing Chun
8. (Hong Kong) Kwok Suen Wang

GP Prague (29–30 August 2015)

- Format: Standard
- Attendance: 1464
1. (France) Elliot Boussaud
2. (Belgium) Peter Vieren
3. (Estonia) Hannes Kerem
4. (Slovenia) Davor Detecnik
5. (Italy) Mattia Rizzi
6. (Austria) Oliver Polak-Rottman
7. (Luxembourg) Steve Hatto
8. (Germany) Alex Hottman

GP London (15–16 August 2015)

- Format: Standard
- Attendance: 2152
1. (England) Fabrizio Anteri
2. (Italy) Matteo Moure
3. (Norway) Erik Skinstad
4. (Greece) Bill Chronopoulos
5. (Poland) Piotr Wald
6. (Italy) Marco Cammilluzzi
7. (Czech Republic) Martin Juza
8. (Venezuela) Daniel Fior

GP Santiago (29–30 August 2015)

- Format: Limited
- Attendance: 799
1. (Chile) Rodrigo Lopez
2. (Japan) Tomoharu Saitou
3. (Chile) Jorge Guerra
4. (Argentina) Martin Quiroga
5. (Chile) Esteban Truyol
6. (Chile) Christian Flores
7. (Chile) Claudio Barrientos Ochoa
8. (Chile) Alberto Sanchez

== Magic: The Gathering World Championship ==
Seattle (27–30 August 2015)

- Prize pool: $150,000
- Format: Modern Masters Booster Draft, Standard, Magic Origins Booster Draft, Modern

=== Top 4 playoff ===
Semifinals
1	Seth Manfield	3
4	Sam Black	1
2	Owen Turtenwald	3
3	Paul Rietzl	1

Finals
Seth Manfield	3
Owen Turtenwald	2

=== Final standings ===
The following twenty-four players received an invitation to the 2015 World Championship due to their performance in the 2014–15 season. They are ordered according to the final standings of the event.

#	Player	Prize	Pro points	Qualified due to
1	(United States) Seth Manfield	$50,000	17	Most Pro Points of otherwise unqualified
2	(United States) Owen Turtenwald	$20,000	11	4th most Pro Points of otherwise unqualified
3	(United States) Paul Rietzl	$10,000	9	2nd most Pro Points of otherwise unqualified
4	(United States) Sam Black	$10,000	9	3rd most Pro Points North America
5	(Sweden) Magnus Lantto	$5,000	9	2014 Magic Online Champion
6	(Denmark) Martin Müller	$5,000	8	2014 World Magic Cup winner
7	(Canada) Shaun McLaren	$5,000	8	3rd most Pro Points of otherwise unqualified
8	(Brazil) Thiago Saporito	$5,000	8	2nd Most Pro Point Latin America
9	(Czech Republic) Ondřej Stráský	$3,000	8	Most Pro Points Europe
10	(Japan) Yuuya Watanabe	$3,000	7	2nd Most Pro Points APAC region
11	(Brazil) Paulo Vitor Damo da Rosa	$3,000	7	Most Pro Points Latin America
12	(Canada) Jacob Wilson	$3,000	7	6th most Pro Points of otherwise unqualified
13	(Sweden) Joel Larsson	$3,000	7	Pro Tour Magic Origins winner
14	(Canada) Alexander Hayne	$3,000	7	2014–15 Grand Prix Player of the Year
15	(Denmark) Martin Dang	$3,000	6	Pro Tour Dragons of Tarkir winner
16	(United States) Steve Rubin	$3,000	6	5th most Pro Points of otherwise unqualified
17	(Japan) Kentaro Yamamoto	$2,000	6	3rd Most Pro Points APAC region
18	(United States) Mike Sigrist	$2,000	6	2014–15 Player of the Year
19	(United States) Eric Froehlich	$2,000	6	2nd Most Pro Points North America
20	(Hong Kong) Lee Shi Tian	$2,000	6	Most Pro Points APAC region
21	(United States) Brad Nelson	$2,000	5	4th most Pro Points North America
22	(Spain) Antonio del Moral Leon	$2,000	5	Pro Tour Fate Reforged winner
23	(Israel) Shahar Shenhar	$2,000	4	2014 World Champion
24	(United States) Ari Lax	$2,000	2	Pro Tour Khans of Tarkir winner

=== Pro Player of the year standings ===
Rank	Player	Pro Points
1	(United States) Seth Manfield	21
2	(United States) Owen Turtenwald	16
2	(Canada) Jacob Wilson	16
4	(United States) Paul Rietzl	13
5	(Czech Republic) Ondřej Stráský	12

== Grand Prix ==
GP Madrid (12–13 September 2015)

- Format: Limited
- Attendance: 1420
1. (Serbia) Aleksa Telarov
2. (England) Francesco Giorgio
3. (Germany) Ashraf Abou Omar
4. (Denmark) Michael Bonde
5. (England) Fabrizio Anteri
6. (Germany) Wenzel Krautmann
7. (Ukraine) Sergiy Sushalskyy
8. (Spain) Antonio Del Moral León

GP Sydney (10–11 October 2015)

- Format: Limited
- Attendance: 996
1. (New Zealand) John Seaton
2. (Republic of Ireland) Alex Ball
3. (Singapore) Kelvin Chew
4. (Australia) Prads Pathirana
5. (Japan) Hironobu Sugaya
6. (New Zealand) Zen Takahashi
7. (France) Paul Costentin
8. (Australia) Chester Swords

GP Oklahoma City (12–13 September 2015)

- Format: Modern
- Attendance: 1470
1. (United States) Zac Elsik
2. (United States) Brian Braun-Duin
3. (United States) Andrew Sullano
4. (United States) Joseph Reiter
5. (United States) Jasper Johnson-Epstein
6. (United States) Benjamin Miller
7. (United States) Paul Rietzl
8. (United States) Matthew Duggan

GP Madison (10–11 October 2015)

- Format: Limited
- Attendance: 1820
1. (France) Raphaël Lévy
2. (Sweden) Magnus Lantto
3. (United States) Jon Graham
4. (United States) Joe Lavrenz
5. (United States) Paul Rietzl
6. (United States) Andrew Maine
7. (United States) Samuel Pardee
8. (France) Jérémy Dezani

== Pro Tour Battle for Zendikar ==
Milwaukee (16–18 October 2015)

- Prize pool: $250,000
- Format: Standard, Booster Draft (Battle for Zendikar-Battle for Zendikar-Battle for Zendikar)

=== Top 8 ===
Quarter-finals
1	Owen Turtenwald	0
8	Paul Dean	2
4	Martin Müller	0
5	Kazuyuki Takimura	2
3	Paulo Vitor Damo da Rosa	0
6	Jon Finkel	2
2	Ricky Chin	1
7	Ryoichi Tamada	2

Semi-finals
Paul Dean	0
Kazuyuki Takimura	2
Jon Finkel	1
Ryoichi Tamada	2

Finals
Kaziyuki Takimura	3
Ryoichi Tamada	2

=== Final standings ===
Place	Player	Prize	Pro Points	Comment
1	(Japan) Kaziyuki Takimura	$40,000	30	
2	(Japan) Ryoichi Tamada	$20,000	26	
3	(United States) Jon Finkel	$12,500	22	15th final day
4	(Canada) Paul Dean	$12,500	22	
5	(United States) Owen Turtenwald	$10,000	18	3rd final day
6	(Canada) Ricky Chin	$10,000	18	Pro Tour debut
7	(Brazil) Paulo Vitor Damo da Rosa	$10,000	18	10th final day
8	(Denmark) Martin Müller	$10,000	18	

=== Pro Player of the year standings ===
Rank	Player	Pro Points
1	(United States) Owen Turtenwald	39
2	(United States) Seth Manfield	32
3	(Japan) Kazuyuki Takimura	30
3	(United States) Paul Rietzl	30
5	(Brazil) Paulo Vitor Damo da Rosa	29

== Grand Prix ==
GP Quebec City (24–25 October 2015)

- Format: Standard
- Attendance: 804
1. (Canada) Dan Lanthier
2. (Canada) Omar Beldon
3. (United States) Jake Mondello
4. (Austria) Oliver Polak-Rottmann
5. (United States) Reid Duke
6. (Canada) Edgar Magelhaes
7. (Canada) Pascal Maynard
8. (Canada) Nicolas Béland

GP Beijing (24–25 October 2015)

- Format: Team Limited
- Attendance: 813 (271 teams)

1.

(United States) Craig Wescoe
(Canada) Richard Hoaen
(United States) Mike Hron

2.

(Japan) Yuuya Watanabe
(Japan) Makihito Mihara
(Japan) Yuuki Ichikawa

3.

(China) Liu Yuchen
(China) He Yue
(China) Zhang Zhiyang

4.

(Japan) Shintaro Ishimura
(Japan) Yoshihiko Ikawa
(Japan) Kazuyuki Takimura

GP Indianapolis (31 October–1 November 2015)

- Format: Standard
- Attendance: 1103
1. (United States) Brent Clawson
2. (United States) Raymond Perez Jr.
3. (United States) Scott Kirkwood
4. (United States) Daniel Chan
5. (United States) David Phelps
6. (United States) Patrick Chapin
7. (Austria) Valentin Mackl
8. (United States) Daniel Duan

GP Lyon (31 October–1 November 2015)

- Format: Limited
- Attendance: 1952
1. (France) Damien Bouillot
2. (Germany) Christian Seibold
3. (Japan) Tomoharu Saitou
4. (Belgium) Vincent Lemoine
5. (Belgium) Branco Neirynck
6. (Germany) Florian Reiter
7. (Austria) Mark Litvak
8. (Germany) Felix Weidemann

GP Atlanta (14–15 November 2015)

- Format: Limited
- Attendance: 2073
1. (United States) Tom Martell
2. (United States) Owen Turtenwald
3. (United States) Dan Musser
4. (United States) Aryeh Wiznitzer
5. (United States) Evan Smith
6. (United States) Brian Eason
7. (United States) Samuel Black
8. (United States) Joseph Pressley

GP Pittsburgh (21–22 November 2015)

- Format: Modern
- Attendance: 2679
1. (United States) Alex Bianchi
2. (United States) Aaron Webster
3. (United States) Robert Cucunato
4. (United States) Craig Wescoe
5. (United States) Corey Burkhart
6. (United States) Robert Long
7. (United States) Thien Nguyen
8. (United States) Benjamin Nikolich

GP Porto Alegre (31 October–1 November 2015)

- Format: Modern
- Attendance: 789
1. (Brazil) Marcos Paulo De Jesus Freitas
2. (Brazil) Vagner Casatti
3. (Brazil) Caio Amaral
4. (Argentina) Alejandro Cesa
5. (Brazil) Thiago Saporito
6. (Brazil) Gabriel Fehr
7. (Brazil) Guilherme Merjam
8. (Argentina) Diego Marquez

GP Brussels (14–15 November 2015)

- Format: Standard
- Attendance: 1938
1. (Czech Republic) Lukas Blohon
2. (Denmark) Simon Nielsen
3. (Italy) Antonio Castellani
4. (Denmark) Martin Müller
5. (Sweden) Magnus Lantto
6. (Poland) Grzegorz Kowalski
7. (Netherlands) Bart Van Etten
8. (Czech Republic) Ondřej Stráský

GP Seattle-Tacoma (7–8 November 2015)

- Format: Legacy
- Attendance: 2014
1. (United States) Jarvis Yu
2. (United States) Christian Calcano
3. (United States) Brian DeMars
4. (United States) Chase Hansen
5. (Latvia) Andrejs Prost
6. (United States) Gary Wong
7. (United States) Martin Goldman-Kirst
8. (China) Xin Sui

GP Kobe (21–22 November 2015)

- Format: Standard
- Attendance: 2571
1. (Japan) Takuma Morofuji
2. (Malaysia) Joe Soh
3. (Japan) Akio Chiba
4. (Japan) Shota Takao
5. (Czech Republic) Pavel Matousek
6. (Japan) Shunsuke Takahira
7. (Japan) Akihiro Okawa
8. (Japan) Shuhei Nakamura

== World Magic Cup ==
Barcelona (11–13 December 2015)

- Prize pool: $250,000
- Format: Team Constructed, Team Limited

=== Top 8 ===
Quarter-finals
1	France	2
8	Japan	0
4	Denmark	1
5	Thailand	2
3	Austria	2
6	Guatemala	0
2	Italy	2
7	Scotland	1

Semi-finals
France	1
Thailand	2
Austria	1
Italy	2

Finals
Thailand	0
Italy	2

=== Final standings ===
Place	Country	Player	Prize	Pro Points
1	Italy	Marco Cammilluzzi	$12,000	8
1	Italy	William Pizzi	$12,000	8
1	Italy	Francesco Bifero	$12,000	8
1	Italy	Andrea Mengucci	$12,000	8
2	Thailand	Veerapat Sirilertvorakul	$6,500	7
2	Thailand	Aekarash Sorakup	$6,500	7
2	Thailand	Suttipong Popitukgul	$6,500	7
2	Thailand	Chom Pasidparchya	$6,500	7
3	France	Pierre Dagen	$4,000	6
3	France	Hichem Tedjditi	$4,000	6
3	France	Fathi Ben Aribi	$4,000	6
3	France	Arnaud Soumet	$4,000	6
4	Austria	Valentin Mackl	$4,000	6
4	Austria	Nikolaus Eigner	$4,000	6
4	Austria	Christoph Aukenthaler	$4,000	6
4	Austria	Sebastian Fiala-Ibitz	$4,000	6

Place	Country	Player	Prize	Pro Points
5	Denmark	Martin Dang	$2,000	5
5	Denmark	Christoffer Larsen	$2,000	5
5	Denmark	Daniel Lind	$2,000	5
5	Denmark	Martin Müller	$2,000	5
6	Guatemala	Christopher Virula	$2,000	5
6	Guatemala	Fernando José Juárez Oliva	$2,000	5
6	Guatemala	José Andrés	$2,000	5
6	Guatemala	Wilfredo Bojorquez	$2,000	5
7	Scotland	Stephen Murray	$2,000	5
7	Scotland	Ray Doyle	$2,000	5
7	Scotland	Grant Hislop	$2,000	5
7	Scotland	Martin Clement	$2,000	5
8	Japan	Yuuya Watanabe	$2,000	5
8	Japan	Kenji Tsumura	$2,000	5
8	Japan	Ryoichi Tamada	$2,000	5
8	Japan	Soyo You	$2,000	5

== Grand Prix ==
GP Oakland (9–10 January 2016)

- Format: Standard
- Attendance: 1928
1. (United States) Reid Duke
2. (United States) Ben Rubin
3. (United States) Woodrow Engle
4. (United States) Cody Lingelbach
5. (United States) Josh McClain
6. (United States) Justin Nguyen
7. (United States) Brett Sinclair
8. (United States) Nathaniel Smith

GP Mexico City (30–31 January 2016)

- Format: Limited
- Attendance: 787
1. (England) Fabrizio Anteri
2. (Japan) Tomoharu Saitou
3. (Brazil) Rodrigo Goncalves Dos Santos
4. (Mexico) Cristian Velasco
5. (Denmark) Martin Dang
6. (Mexico) Leonardo Ivan Ruiz Rivera
7. (United States) Robert Wallerstein
8. (Portugal) Marcio Carvalho

GP Vancouver (30–31 January 2016)

- Format: Limited
- Attendance: 1929
1. (United States) Adam Jansen
2. (France) Jérémy Dezani
3. (United States) Nick Slind
4. (United States) Gabriel Carlton-Barnes
5. (United States) Allen Sun
6. (Canada) Aeo Paquette
7. (Canada) Chris Hewitt
8. (United States) Eric Severson

GP Nagoya (30–31 January 2016)

- Format: Limited
- Attendance: 2565
1. (Japan) Tomonori Hirami
2. (Japan) Ryota Takeuchi
3. (Japan) Ikuya Asai
4. (Japan) Fujimura Kazuaki
5. (South Korea) Park Jun-young
6. (Japan) Shawn McNeace
7. (England) Sean Li
8. (Japan) Satoshi Haji

== Pro Tour Oath of the Gatewatch ==
Atlanta (5–7 February 2016)

- Prize pool: $250,000
- Format: Modern, Booster Draft (Oath of the Gatewatch-Oath of the Gatewatch-Battle for Zendikar)

=== Top 8 ===
Quarter-finals
1	Shuhei Nakamura	1
8	Jiachen Tao	3
4	Luis Scott-Vargas	3
5	Pascal Maynard	2
3	Andrew Brown	0
6	Patrick Dickmann	3
2	Ivan Floch	3
7	Frank Lepore	2

Semi-finals
Jiachen Tao	3
Luis Scott-Vargas	2
Patrick Dickmann	1
Ivan Floch	3

Finals
Jiachen Tao	3
Ivan Floch	1

=== Final standings ===
Place	Player	Prize	Pro Points	Comment
1	(United States) Jiachen Tao	$40,000	30	
2	(Slovakia) Ivan Floch	$20,000	26	3rd final day
3	(United States) Luis Scott-Vargas	$12,500	22	6th final day
4	(Germany) Patrick Dickmann	$12,500	22	2nd final day
5	(Japan) Shuhei Nakamura	$10,000	18	6th final day
6	(United States) Andrew Brown	$10,000	18	
7	(Canada) Pascal Maynard	$10,000	18	
8	(United States) Frank Lepore	$10,000	18	Pro Tour debut

=== Pro Player of the year standings ===
At the end of this event, the top ranking player in Pro Points, Owen Turtenwald, was awarded the "Mid-season master" title, which will yield him an invitation to the 2016 World Championship.

Rank	Player	Pro Points
1	(United States) Owen Turtenwald	57
2	(Denmark) Martin Müller	46
2	(Brazil) Paulo Vitor Damo da Rosa	46
4	(United States) Seth Manfield	45
5	(United States) Reid Duke	43
5	(England) Fabrizio Anteri	43

== Grand Prix ==
GP Houston (27–28 February 2016)

- Format: Standard
- Attendance: 1851
1. (United States) Owen Turtenwald
2. (United States) Andrew Cuneo
3. (United States) Mark Jacobson
4. (United States) Brock Mosley
5. (United States) Cody Lingelbach
6. (United States) Brock Parker
7. (Singapore) Chapman Sim
8. (United States) Amir Radmard

GP Melbourne (5–6 March 2016)

- Format: Modern
- Attendance: 1105
1. (Australia) David Mines
2. (Australia) Maitland Cameron
3. (Japan) Yuuki Ichikawa
4. (New Zealand) Louis Thomson-Gregg
5. (Australia) Chris Cousens
6. (Japan) Kentaro Yamamoto
7. (Hong Kong) Lee Shi Tian
8. (New Zealand) Jason Chung

GP Detroit (5–6 March 2016)

- Format: Modern
- Attendance: 2553
1. (United States) Ralph Betesh
2. (United States) Evan Buchholz
3. (United States) Eric English
4. (Taiwan) Huang Hao-shan
5. (United States) Gerry Thompson
6. (England) Eduardo Sajgalik
7. (United States) James Zornes
8. (United States) Ronnie Ritner

GP Washington, D.C. (12–13 March 2016)

- Format: Team Limited
- Attendance: 3366 (1122 teams)

1.

(United States) Justin Cohen
(United States) Matt Severa
(United States) Mike Hron

2.

(Canada) Richard Hoaen
(United States) Tom Martell
(United States) Ian Spaulding

3.

(United States) Owen Turtenwald
(United States) William Jensen
(United States) Reid Duke

4.

(United States) Matthew Nass
(Canada) Jacob Wilson
(United States) Sam Pardee

GP Bologna (5–6 March 2016)

- Format: Modern
- Attendance: 2181
1. (England) Kayure Patel
2. (Italy) Alberto Mattioli
3. (Italy) Giuseppe Reale
4. (Spain) Ruben Perez
5. (England) Fabrizio Anteri
6. (Czech Republic) Jaroslav Boucek
7. (Italy) Mattia Rizzi
8. (Italy) Alessandro Lippi

GP Paris (19–20 March 2016)

- Format: Standard
- Attendance: 1510
1. (Czech Republic) Petr Sochůrek
2. (United States) Ben Stark
3. (Japan) Ryoichi Tamada
4. (Czech Republic) Martin Jůza
5. (Germany) Arne Huschenbeth
6. (Italy) Giuseppe Reale
7. (Germany) Fabian Friedrich
8. (Italy) Paolo Magnani

GP Beijing (16–17 April 2016)

- Format: Limited
- Attendance: 1056
1. (Japan) Hironobu Sugaya
2. (China) Xu Su
3. (Japan) Kazuaki Fujimura
4. (China) Gao Zhen Xing
5. (Japan) Makihito Mihara
6. (Japan) Kentarou Yamamoto
7. (Japan) Toru Inoue
8. (Macau) Mak Wai Hou

GP Albuquerque (16–17 April 2016)

- Format: Limited
- Attendance: 1266
1. (United States) Allen Wu
2. (United States) William Craddock
3. (United States) Jacob Thiessen
4. (United States) Seth Manfield
5. (United States) Michael Simon
6. (United States) Jiachen Tao
7. (United States) Christian Keeth
8. (United States) Rick Chong

GP Barcelona (16–17 April 2016)

- Format: Limited
- Attendance: 2084
1. (England) Fabrizio Anteri
2. (France) Mehdi Saadi
3. (United States) William Jensen
4. (Latvia) Viktors Kazanskis
5. (United States) Brian Braun-Duin
6. (Canada) Shaun McLaren
7. (United States) Reid Duke
8. (Spain) Ferran Vila

== Pro Tour Shadows over Innistrad ==
Pro Tour Shadows over Innistrad was the 100th Magic: The Gathering Pro Tour. For the Top 8 single elimination stage the mode was modified from previous Pro Tours. Previously only the first game was played unsideboarded with players having access to their sideboard for all subsequent games in a match. From PT Shadows over Innistrad on, players only have access to their sideboard beginning with the third game of a Top 8 match. The Pro Tour's Top 8 included some of the most successful Magic players of all time, including Hall of Famers Jon Finkel, Luis Scott-Vargas, and Shouta Yasooka.

=== Tournament data ===
- Location: Madrid (22–24 April 2016)
- Prize pool: $250,000
- Format: Standard, Booster Draft (Shadows over Innistrad)

=== Top 8 ===
Quarter-finals
1	Jon Finkel	1
8	Andrea Mengucci	3
4	Luis Scott-Vargas	1
5	Shouta Yasooka	3
3	Brad Nelson	0
6	Steve Rubin	3
2	Seth Manfield	3
7	Luis Salvatto	0

Semi-finals
Andrea Mengucci	3
Shouta Yasooka	2
Steve Rubin	3
Seth Manfield	2

Finals
Andrea Mengucci	1
Steve Rubin	3

=== Final standings ===
Place	Player	Prize	Pro Points	Comment
1	(United States) Steve Rubin	$40,000	30	
2	(Italy) Andrea Mengucci	$20,000	26	2nd final day
3	(United States) Seth Manfield	$12,500	22	2nd final day
4	(Japan) Shouta Yasooka	$12,500	22	3rd final day
5	(United States) Jon Finkel	$10,000	18	16th final day
6	(United States) Brad Nelson	$10,000	18	3rd final day
7	(United States) Luis Scott-Vargas	$10,000	18	7th final day
8	(Argentina) Luis Salvatto	$10,000	18	

=== Pro Player of the year standings ===
Rank	Player	Pro Points
1	(United States) Seth Manfield	71
2	(United States) Owen Turtenwald	70
3	(England) Fabrizio Anteri	57
4	(United States) Steve Rubin	56
4	(Denmark) Martin Müller	56

== Grand Prix ==
GP Toronto (30 April–1 May 2016)

- Format: Standard
- Attendance: 1727
1. (Canada) Robert Lombardi
2. (Canada) Jon Stern
3. (United States) Oliver Tiu
4. (Canada) Doug Potter
5. (Canada) Josh Buitenhuis
6. (Canada) Brett Tetley
7. (United States) Bradley Robinson
8. (Canada) Michael Sheng

GP Los Angeles (21–22 May 2016)

- Format: Modern
- Attendance: 2239
1. (United States) Simon Slutsky
2. (United States) Ethan Brown
3. (Spain) Javier Dominguez
4. (Canada) Pascal Maynard
5. (United States) Joe Lossett
6. (United States) Corey Burkhart
7. (United States) Alex To
8. (United States) Erik Carson

GP Manchester (28–29 May 2016)

- Format: Standard
- Attendance: 1697
1. (France) Raphaël Lévy
2. (France) Julien Henry
3. (Denmark) Oscar Christensen
4. (Sweden) Jonas Friberg
5. (Sweden) Lauri Vuorela
6. (England) Matthew Hunt
7. (Denmark) Christoffer Larsen
8. (Poland) Adam Bajerowicz

GP Columbus (11–12 June 2016)

- Format: Legacy
- Attendance: 1824
1. (United States) Clay Spicklemire
2. (United States) Joe Lossett
3. (United States) Noah Walker
4. (United States) Christopher Walton
5. (United States) Wilson Hunter
6. (United States) Raymond Cornely
7. (United States) Jarvis Yu
8. (Canada) Aaron Kasprzak

GP São Paulo (2–3 July 2016)

- Format: Team limited
- Attendance: 1086 (362 teams)

1.

(Brazil) Francisco Barciella
(Brazil) Carlos Romão
(Brazil) Eloi Pattaro

2.

(Brazil) Jonathan Melamed
(Brazil) Mateus Martins
(Brazil) Paulo Martinello

3.

(Canada) Pascal Maynard
(United States) Brian Braun-Duin
(United States) Shaheen Soorani

4

(Brazil) Renato Pinto
(Brazil) Leonardo Labruna
(Brazil) Diego Coelho

GP Montreal (30–31 July 2016)

- Format: Limited
- Attendance: 1348
1. (United States) Hunter Cochran
2. (Canada) Hugo Demers
3. (Canada) Felix Tse
4. (Canada) Morgan McLaughlin
5. (Canada) Robert Lombardi
6. (Canada) Philippe Gareau
7. (Canada) Michael Ferneyhough
8. (Canada) Jamie Madill

GP New York (7–8 May 2016)

- Format: Standard
- Attendance: 2007
1. (United States) Seth Manfield
2. (France) Louis Deltour
3. (United States) Scott Lipp
4. (United States) Michael Majors
5. (United States) Mike Sigrist
6. (United States) Daniel Ward
7. (United States) Brandon Ayers
8. (United States) Ralph Batesh

GP Charlotte (21–22 May 2016)

- Format: Modern
- Attendance: 2399
1. (Switzerland) Andreas Ganz
2. (United States) Jon Bolding
3. (United States) Robert Graves
4. (United States) Mike Sigrist
5. (United States) Jacky Wang
6. (United States) Adonnys Medrano
7. (United States) Sam Black
8. (United States) Eli Kassis

GP Costa Rica (4–5 June 2016)

- Format: Standard
- Attendance: 497
1. (United States) Seth Manfield
2. (United States) Brandon Fischer
3. (United States) Oliver Tiu
4. (Mexico) Erick Manuel Lopez Basulto
5. (United States) Brian Braun-Duin
6. (United States) Michael Derczo
7. (Panama) Saul Alvarado
8. (Spain) Javier Dominguez

GP Taipei (25–26 June 2016)

- Format: Standard
- Attendance: 792
1. (Japan) Yuuki Ichikawa
2. (Taiwan) Huang Yung-Ming
3. (Hong Kong) Lee Shi Tian
4. (Japan) Yuuta Takahashi
5. (Taiwan) Lieu Chien-Hung
6. (Thailand) Mingrerk Setsompop
7. (Japan) Shawn McNeace
8. (China) Liu Yuchen

GP Stockholm (30–31 July 2016)

- Format: Limited
- Attendance: 1244
1. (Netherlands) Elmer van Eeghen
2. (Italy) Matteo Moure
3. (Germany) Andreas Reling
4. (Sweden) Erik Wahlberg
5. (Norway) Bjornar Prytz
6. (Switzerland) Yannick Studer
7. (Germany) Max Pritsch
8. (Italy) Federico Del Basso

GP Tokyo (7–8 May 2016)

- Format: Standard
- Attendance: 3335
1. (Japan) Riku Kumagai
2. (Japan) Kazushige Suzuki
3. (Japan) Takuma Morofuji
4. (Spain) Carlos Ballester
5. (Japan) Kazuki Yada
6. (Japan) Takaya Saito
7. (Japan) Kensuke Kato
8. (Singapore) Eng Chu Heng

GP Minneapolis (28–29 May 2016)

- Format: Standard
- Attendance: 1530
1. (United States) Alexander Johnson
2. (Japan) Shota Takao
3. (United States) Andrew Elenbogen
4. (United States) Matt Severa
5. (United States) Max McVety
6. (United States) Owen Turtenwald
7. (United States) Reed Hartman
8. (Japan) Yuuya Watanabe

GP Prague (11–12 June 2016)

- Format: Legacy
- Attendance: 1477
1. (Spain) Rodrigo Togores
2. (France) Nicolas Tholance
3. (Denmark) Thomas Enevoldsen
4. (Canada) Alexander Hayne
5. (Republic of Ireland) Niels Molle
6. (Czech Republic) Lukas Blohon
7. (Italy) Gianluca Gazzola
8. (France) Arnaud Baglin

GP Pittsburgh (25–26 June 2016)

- Format: Standard
- Attendance: 1379
1. (United States) Evan Petre
2. (Canada) Pascal Maynard
3. (United States) Steve Rubin
4. (United States) William Cruse
5. (Canada) Adam Ragsdale
6. (United States) Eric Flickinger
7. (United States) Matt Tumavitch
8. (Serbia) Aleksa Telarov

GP Sydney (30–31 July 2016)

- Format: Limited
- Attendance: 1076
1. (United States) Scott Lipp
2. (Czech Republic) Jan Ksandr
3. (United States) Ben Stark
4. (United States) Seth Manfield
5. (New Zealand) Zen Takahashi
6. (Argentina) Santiago De Paoli
7. (France) Thierry Ramboa
8. (Australia) Ben Seck

== Pro Tour Eldritch Moon ==
Sydney (5–7 August 2016)

- Prize pool: $250,000
- Format: Standard, Booster Draft

=== Top 8 ===
Quarter-finals
1	Samuel Pardee	3
8	Andrew Brown	1
4	Lukas Blohon	3
5	Ken Yukuhiro	2
3	Yuuta Takahashi	1
6	Owen Turtenwald	3
2	Luis Scott-Vargas	3
7	Reid Duke	0

Semi-finals
Samuel Pardee	0
Lukas Blohon	3
Owen Turtenwald	3
Luis Scott-Vargas	2

Finals
Lukas Blohon	3
Owen Turtenwald	0

=== Final standings ===
Place	Player	Prize	Pro Points	Comment
1	(Czech Republic) Lukas Blohon	$40,000	30	2nd final day
2	(United States) Owen Turtenwald	$20,000	26	4th final day
3	(United States) Samuel Pardee	$12,500	22	
4	(United States) Luis Scott-Vargas	$12,500	22	8th final day
5	(Japan) Yuuta Takahashi	$10,000	18	2nd final day
6	(Japan) Ken Yukuhiro	$10,000	18	2nd final day
7	(United States) Reid Duke	$10,000	18	2nd final day
8	(United States) Andrew Brown	$10,000	18	2nd final day

== Pro Player of the Year final standings ==
The 2015–16 Pro Tour season ended after Pro Tour Eldritch Moon. These are the final standings of the Player of the Year race, including every player who at the end of the season reached Platinum, the highest Pro Club Level.

Place	Player	Pro Points	Place	Player	Pro Points	Place	Player	Pro Points
1	(United States) Owen Turtenwald	98	12	(United States) Brad Nelson	58	23	(United States) Michael Majors	53
2	(United States) Seth Manfield	88	12	(Brazil) Paulo Vitor Damo da Rosa	58	23	(United States) Andrew Brown	53
3	(Czech Republic) Lukas Blohon	81	12	(Canada) Alexander Hayne	58	27	(Japan) Yuuta Takahashi	52
4	(United States) Luis Scott-Vargas	79	12	(Italy) Andrea Mengucci	58	27	(United States) Jiachen Tao	52
5	(United States) Reid Duke	69	12	(United States) Oliver Tiu	58	29	(United States) William Jensen	51
6	(Denmark) Martin Müller	68	18	(United States) Sam Black	57	29	(Canada) Pascal Maynard	51
7	(United States) Steve Rubin	67	18	(Japan) Yuuya Watanabe	57	31	(Japan) Kazuyuki Takimura	50
8	(Sweden) Joel Larsson	63	20	(United States) Jon Finkel	56	31	(Brazil) Thiago Saporito	50
8	(United States) Samuel Pardee	63	20	(Japan) Ryoichi Tamada	56	31	(Hong Kong) Lee Shi Tian	50
10	(Czech Republic) Ondřej Stráský	62	22	(United States) Paul Rietzl	55	31	(Canada) Jacob Wilson	50
11	(Japan) Shouta Yasooka	60	23	(Austria) Oliver Polak-Rottmann	53	31	(Czech Republic) Petr Sochůrek	50
12	(United States) Mike Sigrist	58	23	(Slovakia) Ivan Floch	53	31	(Canada) Paul Dean	50

== Invitees to the 2016 World Championship ==
The following twenty-four players received an invitation to the 2016 World Championship due to their performance in the 2015–16 season.

Player	Qualified due to
(United States) Owen Turtenwald	2015–16 Player of the Year
(United States) Brian Braun-Duin	2015–16 Grand Prix Player of the Year
(United States) Seth Manfield	2015 World Champion
(Netherlands) Niels Noorlander	2015 Magic Online Champion
(Japan) Kazuyuki Takimura	Pro Tour Battle for Zendikar winner
(United States) Jiachen Tao	Pro Tour Oath of the Gatewatch winner
(United States) Steve Rubin	Pro Tour Shadows over Innistrad winner
(Czech Republic) Lukas Blohon	Pro Tour Eldritch Moon winner
(United States) Oliver Tiu	Constructed Master
(Portugal) Marcio Carvalho	Draft Master
(United States) Luis Scott-Vargas	Outstanding Hall of Famer
(United States) Reid Duke	4th Most Pro Points North America
(Denmark) Martin Müller	2nd Most Pro Points Europe
(Sweden) Joel Larsson	3rd Most Pro Points Europe
(Japan) Shouta Yasooka	Most Pro Points Asia-Pacific
(Japan) Yuuya Watanabe	2nd Most Pro Points Asia-Pacific
(Japan) Ryoichi Tamada	3rd Most Pro Points Asia-Pacific
(Brazil) Paulo Vitor Damo da Rosa	Most Pro Points Latin America
(Brazil) Thiago Saporito	2nd Most Pro Points Latin America
(United States) Samuel Pardee	Most Pro Points of otherwise unqualified
(Czech Republic) Ondřej Stráský	2nd Most Pro Points of otherwise unqualified
(Italy) Andrea Mengucci	3rd Most Pro Points of otherwise unqualified
(United States) Brad Nelson	4th Most Pro Points of otherwise unqualified
(United States) Mike Sigrist	5th Most Pro Points of otherwise unqualified
