= Lee Shi Tian =

Hong Kong Magic: The Gathering player

- Pro Tour debut: Kyoto 2009
- Winnings: US$101,245
- Pro Tour wins (Top 8): 0 (5)
- Grand Prix wins (Top 8): 1 (7)
- Lifetime Pro Points: 261

Lee Shi Tian is a Hong Kong Magic: The Gathering player inducted into the Hall of Fame in 2018. He first came to prominence in 2008 when he won Grand Prix Birmingham, and has since made the final day of competition at the Pro Tour on five occasions.

== Achievements ==
Season	Event type	Location	Format	Date	Rank
2008	Grand Prix	Birmingham	Block Constructed	30 May–1 June 2008	1
2008	Grand Prix	Taipei	Sealed and Booster Draft	28–29 November 2008	7
2009	Nationals	Hong Kong	Standard and Booster Draft	2009	1
2012–13	Pro Tour	Seattle	Modern and Booster Draft	19–21 October 2012	4
2012–13	Grand Prix	Taipei	Sealed and Booster Draft	24–25 November 2012	8
2013–14	Pro Tour	Valencia	Modern and Booster Draft	21–23 February 2014	5
2013–14	Grand Prix	Moscow	Standard	14–15 June 2014	6
2014–15	Pro Tour	Honolulu	Standard and Booster Draft	10–12 October 2014	8
2014–15	Grand Prix	Manila	Standard	3–4 January 2015	3
2014–15	Pro Tour	Washington, D.C.	Modern and Booster Draft	6–8 February 2015	8
2015–16	Grand Prix	Melbourne	Modern	5–6 March 2016	7
2015–16	Grand Prix	Taipei	Standard	25–26 June 2016	3
2016–17	Pro Tour	Honolulu	Standard and Booster Draft	14–16 October 2016	7

Last updated: 26 June 2016
Source: Event Coverage at Wizards.com

Preceded by Lam Tsz Yeung	Magic Hong Kong National Champion; 2009	Succeeded by Sun Kit Yeung
Preceded by Zhang Meng Qui	Magic Hong Kong National Champion; 2013–2015	Succeeded by Incumbent
