= Matthew Sperling (Magic: The Gathering player) =

American Magic: The Gathering player

- Nationality: (United States) American
- Pro Tour debut: Pro Tour New York 2000
- Winnings: US$76,500
- Pro Tour wins (Top 8): 0 (2)
- Grand Prix wins (Top 8): 1 (6)
- Lifetime Pro Points: 229

Matthew Sperling is an American Magic: The Gathering player. His major successes include top eights at both Core Set Pro Tours and a win at Grand Prix San Jose 2012 alongside Paul Rietzl and David Williams.

== Achievements ==
Season	Event type	Location	Format	Date	Rank
2009	Grand Prix	Minneapolis	Limited	14–15 November 2009	2
2012–13	Grand Prix	San Jose	Team Limited	13–14 October 2012	1
2013–14	Grand Prix	Vancouver	Standard	25–26 January 2014	5
2013–14	Pro Tour	Portland	Standard and Booster Draft	1–3 August 2014	8
2014–15	Grand Prix	Denver	Standard	3–4 January 2015	2
2014–15	Grand Prix	San Jose	Team Limited	31 January–1 February 2015	2
2014–15	Pro Tour	Vancouver	Standard and Booster Draft	31 July–2 August 2015	4
2016–17	Grand Prix	Louisville	Team Limited	10–11 September 2016	4

Last updated: 15 October 2016
Source: Wizards.com
