= Joel Larsson =

Swedish Magic: The Gathering player

Joel Isak Love Larsson
- Nickname(s): Swedish Kibler, Proel
- Born: 1991-11-04; Stockholm
- Nationality: Swedish
- Winnings: US$128,500
- Pro Tour wins (Top 8): 2 (3)
- Grand Prix wins (Top 8): 1 (6)
- Lifetime Pro Points: 279
- Planeswalker Level: 45 (Battlemage)

Joel Larsson is a Swedish professional Magic: The Gathering player. He is most known for winning the Pro Tour Magic Origins competition in August 2015, and for his skills in limited formats. Joel had the highest win percentage in the world in limited matches during the 2011-2012 Pro Tour season. After his Magic the Gathering career he shifted to Warhammer 40,000 and won the Swedish Masters in 2023. He is also known for winning the first Players Tour in 2020.

== Playing career ==
Joel began playing Magic in 2005 and qualified for his first Pro Tour in 2010, making his debut at Pro Tour San Diego. In his eighth Pro Tour, he reached the finals in Montreal where he lost to Tom Martell. Due to his hairdo and appearance, he received the nickname of "Swedish Kibler" after the tournament. In Sweden, he often goes by the nickname "Proel". With 279 pro points Joel has the highest number of pro points of any Swede. After winning Pro Tour Origins in 2015 he took time off his studies in Computer Science to focus even more on the game. After 2016 he scaled down the time allotted to the game because of his studies in Computer Science at Stockholm University. But he made it back with full force in 2020 winning the first Players Tour.

== Achievements ==
Season	Event type	Location	Format	Date	Rank
2011	Nationals	Sweden	Standard and Booster Draft	2011	3
2011	Grand Prix	Prague	Limited	21–22 May 2011	7
2011	Grand Prix	Pittsburgh	Standard	27–28 August 2011	5
2012	Grand Prix	Manchester	Limited	21–22 April 2012	3
2012–13	Pro Tour	Montreal	Standard and Booster Draft	15–17 February 2013	2
2012–13	Grand Prix	Utrecht	Limited	16–17 March 2013	2
2014–15	Grand Prix	Dallas	Limited	19–20 July 2015	6
2014–15	Pro Tour	Vancouver	Standard and Booster Draft	31 July – 2 August 2015	1
2016–17	Grand Prix	Orlando	Limited	24 – 26 March 2017	1
2020	Pro Tour	Brussels	Booster Draft	31 January – 2 February 2020	1

Last updated: 3 February 2020
