= Yuuta Takahashi (Magic: The Gathering player) =

Japanese Magic: The Gathering player

- Nickname: King of the Faeries
- Nationality: (Japan) Japanese
- Pro Tour debut: Pro Tour Los Angeles 2005
- Winnings: US$89,510
- Pro Tour wins (Top 8): 0 (2)
- Grand Prix wins (Top 8): 3 (11)
- Lifetime Pro Points: 268

Yuuta or Yuta Takahashi (高橋 優太, Takahashi Yūta) is a Japanese Magic: The Gathering player. Nicknamed "King of the Faeries", he won two of his three Grand Prix titles with Faeries decks. In 2007, alongside teammate Kentarou Yamamoto, he finished second at Pro Tour San Diego, the only Pro Tour to use the Two-Headed Giant format.

In October 2021, he won the Magic: The Gathering World Championship, defeating Jean-Emmanuel Depraz in the finals. In 2023, his win was memorialized by portraying him on a Magic card, called "Faerie Mastermind", with the flavor text Yuta Takahashi, World Champion XXVII. Depraz won the Magic World Championship that year, with a winning deck including three copies of "Faerie Mastermind".

== Achievements ==
Season	Event type	Location	Format	Date	Rank
2007	Pro Tour	San Diego	Two-Headed Giant	29 June– 1 July 2007	2
2007	Nationals	Japan	Standard and Booster Draft	31 August– 2 September 2007	7
2008	Grand Prix	Shizuoka	Standard	8–9 March 2008	1
2008	Grand Prix	Kobe	Block Constructed	2–3 August 2008	1
2008	Nationals	Yokohama	Standard and Booster Draft	19–21 September 2008	6
2009	Grand Prix	Singapore	Extended	21–22 March 2009	4
2010	Grand Prix	Manila	Standard	12–13 June 2010	7
2013–14	Grand Prix	Kitakyushu	Standard	24–25 August 2013	6
2013–14	Grand Prix	Hong Kong	Sealed and Booster Draft	18–19 October 2013	4
2013–14	Grand Prix	Chicago	Standard	21–22 June 2014	4
2014–15	Grand Prix	Kyoto	Legacy	18–19 April 2015	1
2014–15	Grand Prix	Singapore	Modern	27–28 June 2015	6
2015–16	Grand Prix	Taipei	Standard	25–26 June 2016	4
2015–16	Pro Tour	Sydney	Standard and Booster Draft	5–7 August 2016	5
2016–17	Grand Prix	Kuala Lumpur	Standard	22-23 October 2016	5

Last updated: 4 November 2016
Source: Event Coverage at Wizards.com
