= Lukáš Blohon =

Czech Magic: The Gathering player

- Nationality: (Czech Republic) Czech
- Pro Tour debut: Pro Tour Yokohama 2007
- Winnings: US$110,735
- Pro Tour wins (Top 8): 1 (2)
- Grand Prix wins (Top 8): 1 (6)
- Lifetime Pro Points: 266

Lukáš Blohon is a Czech Magic: The Gathering player. He was the winner of Pro Tour Eldrich Moon in 2016. He also had a quarterfinals appearance at Pro Tour Dark Ascension in 2012.

== Achievements ==
| Season | Event type | Location | Format | Date | Rank |
|---|---|---|---|---|---|
| 2010 | Grand Prix | Lyon | Sealed and Booster Draft | 8–9 May 2010 | 6 |
| 2011 | Grand Prix | Prague | Sealed and Booster Draft | 21–22 May 2011 | 2 |
| 2012 | Pro Tour | Honolulu | Standard and Booster Draft | 10–12 February 2012 | 7 |
| 2014–15 | Grand Prix | Stockholm | Standard | 25–26 October 2014 | 4 |
| 2014–15 | Grand Prix | Liverpool | Sealed and Booster Draft | 7–8 March 2015 | 3 |
| 2015–16 | Grand Prix | Brussels | Standard | 14–15 November 2015 | 1 |
| 2015–16 | Pro Tour | Sydney | Standard and Booster Draft | August 5–7, 2016 | 1 |
| 2016–17 | Grand Prix | Rimini | Standard | 13–14 August 2016 | 5 |

Last updated: 28 August 2016
Source: Event Coverage at Wizards.com
