= Eric Froehlich =

American poker player (born 1984)

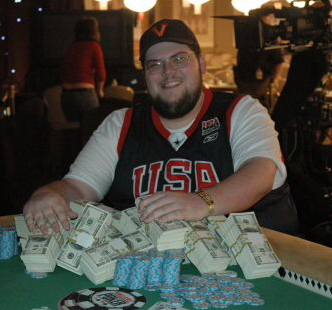
- Froehlich at the 2005 World Series of Poker
- Nickname: Efro
- Born: February 9, 1984 (age 42)

World Series of Poker
- Bracelets: 2
- Money finishes: 16
- Highest WSOP Main Event finish: 23rd, 2018

World Poker Tour
- Title: None
- Final table: 1
- Money finish: 1

Eric Froehlich (born February 9, 1984, in Philadelphia, Pennsylvania) is an American professional poker player, professional Magic: The Gathering player, and member of the Magic: The Gathering Hall of Fame. He lives in Las Vegas, Nevada, with his wife, Magic: The Gathering streamer Athena Huey. As of 2023, Froehlich's total live poker tournament winnings exceed $2,682,733. His 48 cashes at the WSOP account for $1,930,090 of those winnings.

Eric Froehlich
- Nickname: Efro
- Pro Tour debut: Pro Tour London 1999
- Winnings: US$155,139
- Pro Tour wins (Top 8): 0 (4)
- Grand Prix wins (Top 8): 2 (15)
- Lifetime Pro Points: 363
- Planeswalker Level: 48 (Archmage)

== Early life ==
Froehlich attended Thomas Jefferson High School for Science and Technology. Froehlich began playing poker in high school and got involved in online poker at the age of 18. He dropped out of the University of Virginia around April 2005 to become a professional poker player.

== World Series of Poker ==
He entered a World Series of Poker (WSOP) tournament in 2005; Froehlich won a bracelet in the $1,500 limit Texas hold 'em event, making $303,908. At the time, this made him the youngest player to ever win a bracelet.

Froehlich won a second bracelet at the 2006 WSOP tournament, in the $1,500 pot limit]] Omaha w/rebuys event, making $299,675. In the final hand, his Q♦ 7♦ 7♥ 6♠ defeated Sherkhan Farnood's K♥ K♦ 6♣ 3♥ on a board of 10♣ 7♥ 5♣ J♦ J♥.

Shortly after Froehlich's status as the youngest bracelet winner of all time, he was overtaken by Jeff Madsen during the 2006 World Series of Poker and Steve Billirakis at the 2007 World Series of Poker. In September 2007 at the inaugural World Series of Poker Europe, Norwegian poker player Annette Obrestad won the £10,000 No-Limit Texas Hold'em Championship at the age of 18 to become the youngest World Series of Poker bracelet winner.

=== World Series of Poker bracelets ===
Year	Tournament	Prize (US$)
2005	$1,500 Limit Hold'em	$303,908
2006	$1,500 Pot Limit Omaha With Rebuys	$299,675

== Magic: The Gathering career ==
In addition to playing poker, Froehlich is also a prominent player of the Magic: The Gathering trading card game. Froehlich was a keen sports player when younger, involved in baseball, basketball and football, but suffered an injury and got involved in Magic: The Gathering, like his later friend David Williams. He has made the Top 8 of four Pro Tours and fourteen Grand Prix events. Several of Froehlich's Grand Prix Top 8s have come in team events, in which he has teamed with such prominent professional players as Kamiel Cornelissen, Jon Finkel, Brian Kibler and Luis Scott-Vargas.

In 2015, Froehlich was voted into the Magic: The Gathering Hall of Fame.

=== Accomplishments ===
Season	Event type	Location	Format	Date	Rank
2001–02	Pro Tour	San Diego	Rochester Draft	January 10–13, 2002	8
2001–02	Grand Prix	New Jersey	Team Limited	June 29–30, 2002	4
2002–03	Grand Prix	Amsterdam	Team Limited	June 7–8, 2003	2
2003–04	Grand Prix	Washington DC	Team Limited	April 17–18, 2004	4
2006	Grand Prix	Madison, Wisconsin	Team Constructed	March 25–26, 2006	3
2010	Nationals	Minneapolis	Special	August 20–23, 2010	5
2010	Grand Prix	Toronto	Sealed and Booster Draft	October 23–24, 2010	5
2010	Worlds	Chiba	Special	December 9–12, 2010	5
2012–13	Grand Prix	Anaheim	Block Constructed	May 26–27, 2012	4
2012–13	Grand Prix	San Jose	Team Limited	October 13–14, 2012	3
2012–13	Pro Tour	Montreal	Standard and Booster Draft	February 15–17, 2013	4
2012–13	Grand Prix	San Diego	Modern	March 16–17, 2013	3
2012–13	Grand Prix	Pittsburgh	Sealed and Booster Draft	March 23–24, 2013	4
2013–14	Grand Prix	Phoenix	Standard	April 5–6, 2014	6
2014–15	Grand Prix	Portland	Team Limited	August 8–10, 2014	4
2014–15	Grand Prix	Salt Lake City	Limited	September 6–7, 2014	4
2014–15	Grand Prix	San Jose	Team Limited	January 31–February 1, 2015	1
2014–15	Pro Tour	Washington DC	Modern and Booster Draft	February 6–8, 2015	5
2015–16	Grand Prix	Detroit	Team Limited	August 15–16, 2015	2
2016–17	Grand Prix	Mexico City	Team Limited	April 7–9, 2017	1

Last updated: August 17, 2015
Source: Event Coverage at Wizards.com
Other accomplishments

- Magic: The Gathering Hall of Fame Class of 2015
