= Mike Sigrist =

American Magic: The Gathering player

- Nationality: (United States) American
- Winnings: US$98,783
- Pro Tour wins (Top 8): 0 (3)
- Grand Prix wins (Top 8): 2 (6)
- Lifetime Pro Points: 211

Mike Sigrist is an American Magic: The Gathering player. Most of his significant finishes to date came in the 2014–15 season, in which he also won the Player of the Year title.

== Achievements ==
| Season | Event type | Location | Format | Date | Rank |
|---|---|---|---|---|---|
| 2013–14 | Grand Prix | Richmond | Modern | 8–9 March 2014 | 3 |
| 2013–14 | Grand Prix | Washington, D.C. | Sealed and Booster Draft | 28–29 June 2014 | 1 |
| 2014–15 | Pro Tour | Honolulu | Standard and Booster Draft | 10–12 October 2014 | 4 |
| 2014–15 | Grand Prix | Montreal | Sealed and Booster Draft | 4–5 July 2015 | 1 |
| 2014–15 | Pro Tour | Vancouver | Standard and Booster Draft | 31 July–2 August 2015 | 2 |
| 2015-16 | Grand Prix | New York | Standard | 7-8 May 2016 | 5 |
| 2015-16 | Grand Prix | Charlotte | Limited | 21–22 May 2016 | 4 |
| 2016–17 | Grand Prix | Louisville | Team Limited | 10–11 September 2016 | 3 |
| 2017–18 | Pro Tour | Albuquerque | Standard and Booster Draft | 3–5 November 2017 | 5 |

Last updated: 15 October 2016
Source: Wizards.com

Other accomplishments

- Player of the Year 2014–15

| Preceded by (France) Jérémy Dezani | Pro Player of the Year; 2015 | Succeeded by (United States) Owen Turtenwald |
| Preceded by Owen Turtenwald | US National Champion; 2015 | Succeeded by Owen Turtenwald |
