= Gerard Fabiano =

American Magic: The Gathering player

- Nationality: American
- Pro Tour debut: 2001 Pro Tour New York
- Winnings: US$97,540
- Pro Tour wins (Top 8): 0 (1)
- Grand Prix wins (Top 8): 3 (12)
- Median Pro Tour Finish: 102
- Lifetime Pro Points: 338
- Planeswalker Level: 50 (Archmage)

Gerard Fabiano is an American Magic: The Gathering player from New Jersey. His best finishes include a fourth place at Pro Tour Boston 2002 and wins at Grand Prix Philadelphia 2008, Grand Prix Montreal 2014, and Grand Prix Baltimore 2014.

== Achievements ==
Season	Event type	Location	Format	Date	Rank
2002–03	Pro Tour	Boston	Team Limited	September 27–29, 2002	4
2003–04	Grand Prix	Anaheim	Extended	December 13–14, 2003	8
2005	Grand Prix	Mexico City	Block Constructed	September 3–4, 2005	6
2007	Grand Prix	Massachusetts	Two-Headed Giant	March 31–April 1, 2007	2
2008	Grand Prix	Philadelphia	Extended	March 15–16, 2008	1
2010	Nationals	Minneapolis	Standard and Booster Draft	August 19–22, 2010	7
2010	Grand Prix	Nashville	Sealed and Booster Draft	November 20–21, 2010	3
2012–13	Grand Prix	Charlotte	Sealed and Booster Draft	February 23–24, 2013	2
2013–14	Grand Prix	Montreal	Sealed and Booster Draft	March 15–16, 2014	1
2014–15	Grand Prix	Baltimore	Sealed and Booster Draft	December 13–14, 2014	1
2014–15	Grand Prix	Cleveland	Sealed and Booster Draft	March 14–15, 2015	3
2016–17	Grand Prix	San Antonio	Team Constructed	April 1–2, 2017	3
2016–17	Grand Prix	New Jersey	Sealed and Booster Draft	December 16–17, 2017	3
2018–19	Grand Prix	Niagara Falls	Legacy	April 20–21, 2019	3

Last updated: December 15, 2014
Source: Wizards.com
