= Gerry Thompson =

American Magic: The Gathering player (born 1984)

- Born: September 18, 1984 (age 41)
- Nationality: American
- Pro Tour wins (Top 8): 1 (3)
- Grand Prix wins (Top 8): 2 (10)
- Lifetime Pro Points: 211
- Planeswalker Level: 50 (Archmage)

Gerry W. Thompson is an American Magic: The Gathering player. His career accomplishments include two Grand Prix victories, Pro Tour Top 8 at Montreal in 2013, Bilbao in 2018, and a Pro Tour win at Nashville in 2017. He is also known for his repeated success at the StarCityGames tournament series. His hometown is Elk River, Minnesota.

== Achievements ==
=== Top 8 appearances ===
Season	Event type	Location	Format	Date	Rank
2003–04	Grand Prix	Kansas City, Missouri	Rochester Draft	October 18–19, 2003	6
2005	Grand Prix	Austin	Sealed and Booster Draft	October 9–10, 2004	4
2005	Grand Prix	Minneapolis	Block Constructed	July 16–17, 2005	7
2006	Grand Prix	Richmond	Sealed and Booster Draft	February 4–5, 2006	7
2006	Grand Prix	New Jersey	Sealed and Booster Draft	November 1–12, 2006	5
2008	Grand Prix	Denver	Block Constructed	August 9–10, 2008	1
2008	Grand Prix	Atlanta	Sealed and Booster Draft	November 15–16, 2008	2
2010	Grand Prix	Nashville	Sealed and Booster Draft	November 20–21, 2010	1
2012	Grand Prix	Charleston	Standard	November 17–18, 2012	8
2012–13	Pro Tour	Montreal	Standard and Booster Draft	February 15–17, 2013	7
2015–16	Grand Prix	Detroit	Modern	March 5–6, 2016	5
2016–17	Pro Tour	Nashville	Standard and Booster Draft	May 12–14, 2017	1
2017–18	Pro Tour	Bilbao	Modern	February 2–4, 2018	2

Last updated: March 28, 2018
Source: Event Coverage at Wizards.com
