= Tom Martell =

American Magic: The Gathering player (born 1982)

- Born: May 7, 1982 (age 44)
- Nationality: American
- Pro Tour debut: Pro Tour Chicago 2000
- Winnings: $151,125
- Pro Tour wins (Top 8): 1 (2)
- Grand Prix wins (Top 8): 3 (9)
- Lifetime Pro Points: 284
- Planeswalker Level: 47 (Archmage)

Tom Martell (born May 7, 1982) is an American Magic: The Gathering player. He won Pro Tour Gatecrash in 2013. His other notable finishes include another Pro Tour top 8 at Pro Tour Paris 2011, as well as three Grand Prix wins.

== Career ==
Martell qualified for a few Pro Tours in the early 2000s, but without putting up any major finishes; he disappeared from the professional scene, and quit playing Magic for some time. However, after finishing college and moving to New York, Martell was invited to play at Jon Finkel's apartment, where many of the best players in the area came to play. Martell's first Pro Tour after returning to the game was Pro Tour San Juan 2010, which he qualified for via the Last Chance Qualifier. Martell finished 32nd in the event, qualifying himself for the next Pro Tour. A couple of months later, Martell got his first Grand Prix top 8 by finishing 2nd at Grand Prix Columbus, losing to Tomoharu Saito in the final. He joined Team ChannelFireball prior to Pro Tour Amsterdam. Martell ended the 2010 Pro Tour season on 25 points, earning him invitations to all the Pro Tours in 2011.

The 2011 Pro Season started well for Martell, with him earning his first Pro Tour top 8 at Pro Tour Paris. Like the rest of the ChannelFireball team members, he played 'Caw-Blade', losing to teammate Ben Stark in the quarterfinals. Martell failed to make the top 8 of any more professional events in 2011, and finished the season on 29 points, one shy of level 6 in the Pro Players Club.

In the following seasons, Tom Martell established himself as one of the top professional players. He won his first Grand Prix at GP Indianapolis 2012, and in 2013, he went on to win Pro Tour Gatecrash. His win qualified him for the 2013 World Championship, where he finished 12th. In 2014, he won his second Grand Prix event, in Sacramento, earning much praise from the commentators for his play and his decisions during the top 8 booster draft. He finished the season with enough points to qualify for the World Championship for the second year in a row, where he finished 16th.

The 2014–15 season was a disappointing one for Martell. He did finish in the top 8 of two Grand Prix, at GP Nashville and GP Vancouver, but his Pro Tour finishes were unspectacular, his best result being a 57th-place finish at Pro Tour Dragons of Tarkir. As a result, he didn't finish the year with enough points to reach Platinum status in the Pro Players Club for another season, but he did get enough for Gold.

Since his departure from the Magic: The Gathering scene, he has worked at Riot Games' esports division.

== Achievements ==
| Season | Event type | Location | Format | Date | Rank |
|---|---|---|---|---|---|
| 2010 | Grand Prix | Columbus | Legacy | July 31–August 1, 2010 | 2 |
| 2011 | Pro Tour | Paris | Standard and Booster Draft | February 11–13, 2011 | 7 |
| 2012 | Grand Prix | Indianapolis | Legacy | March 10–11, 2012 | 1 |
| 2012 | Grand Prix | Salt Lake City | Standard | March 31–April 1, 2012 | 3 |
| 2012–13 | Grand Prix | Indianapolis | Limited | December 22–23, 2012 | 7 |
| 2012–13 | Pro Tour | Montreal | Standard and Booster Draft | February 15–17, 2013 | 1 |
| 2013–14 | Grand Prix | Sacramento | Limited | January 18–19, 2014 | 1 |
| 2014–15 | Grand Prix | Nashville | Team Limited | November 1–2, 2014 | 2 |
| 2014–15 | Grand Prix | Vancouver | Modern | February 21–22, 2015 | 5 |
| 2015–16 | Grand Prix | Atlanta | Limited | November 14–15, 2015 | 1 |
| 2015–16 | Grand Prix | Washington, D.C. | Team Limited | 12–13 March 2016 | 2 |

Last updated: March 14, 2016
Source: Wizards.com
