= Craig Wescoe =

American Magic: The Gathering player

- Nationality: American
- Pro Tour debut: Pro Tour Washington D.C. 1999
- Winnings: $147,150
- Pro Tour wins (Top 8): 1 (3)
- Grand Prix wins (Top 8): 1 (9)
- Median Pro Tour Finish: 155
- Lifetime Pro Points: 296
- Planeswalker Level: 49 (Archmage)

Craig Douglas Wescoe is an American Magic: The Gathering player. He won Pro Tour Dragon's Maze in 2013. He has two additional Pro Tour top 8 finishes to his name, and is well known as a champion of the "White Weenie" strategy, having played an aggressive white deck at all the Pro Tours where he made the top 8.

In 2003 Wescoe was baptized as a Christian. He later became vegan. He created Creation Care Church, a vegan animal rights ministry in 2019. This ministry went online during the pandemic and has remained online as an international Christian organization. https://creationcarechurch.com/about/

== Achievements ==
Season	Event type	Location	Format	Date	Rank
2001–02	Grand Prix	Minneapolis	Block Constructed	29–30 September 2001	5
2001–02	Grand Prix	Atlanta	Limited	17–18 November 2001	7
2010	Pro Tour	San Diego	Standard and Booster Draft	19–21 February 2010	4
2011	Worlds	San Francisco	Special	16–19 November 2011	8
2012	Grand Prix	Mexico City	Limited	24–25 March 2012	3
2012–13	Pro Tour	San Diego	Block Constructed and Booster Draft	17–19 May 2013	1
2013–14	Grand Prix	Washington D.C.	Legacy	16–17 November 2013	5
2014–15	Grand Prix	Baltimore	Limited	13–14 December 2014	6
2014–15	Grand Prix	San Jose	Team Limited	31 January–1 February 2015	3
2014–15	Grand Prix	Toronto	Standard	2-3 May 2015	8
2015-16	Grand Prix	Beijing	Team Limited	24-25 October 2015	1
2015–16	Grand Prix	Pittsburgh	Modern	21–22 November 2015	4

Last updated: 9 March 2016
Source: Wizards.com
