= Magic: The Gathering Pro Tour season 2014–15 =

2014–15 Pro Tour season
- Pro Player of the Year: (United States) Mike Sigrist
- Rookie of the Year: (United States) Justin Cohen
- World Champion: (Israel) Shahar Shenhar
- Pro Tours: 4
- Grands Prix: 51
- Hall of Fame inductions: (Japan) Makihito Mihara (United States) Paul Rietzl (France) Guillaume Wafo-Tapa
- Start of season: 9 August 2014
- End of season: 2 August 2015

The 2014–15 Pro Tour season was the twentieth season of the Magic: The Gathering Pro Tour. It started on 9 August 2014 with Grand Prix Portland and Utrecht and ended on 2 August 2015 with the conclusion of Pro Tour Vancouver. The season consisted of 51 Grand Prix and four Pro Tours, located in Honolulu, Washington, D.C., Brussels, and Vancouver.

== Mode ==
Four Pro Tours and 51 Grands Prix were in the 2014–15 season. These are the events that award Pro Points, the points that were used to determine the Player of the Year Standings and Pro Club levels. Players were awarded Pro Levels for earning 20 (Silver level), 35 (Gold), and 46 points (Platinum), however only the six best Grand Prix results were counted towards seasonal point (the newly introduced "Grand Prix" invitation spot in Magic: The Gathering World Championship, however, will count every event in the season). Pro Club Levels came with certain benefits such as qualifications to subsequent Pro Tours, byes at Grand Prix, and airfare to Pro Tours. Based on the final standings of Pro Tours, Grand Prix, Worlds, and the World Magic Cup Pro Points were awarded as follows:

Rank	Pro Points awarded at			
Rank	Pro Tour	Grand Prix (individual)	Grand Prix (teams)	World Magic Cup
1	30	8	6	8
2	26	6	5	7
3–4	22	5	4	6
5–8	18	4	—	5
9–16	—	—	—	4
17–32	—	—	—	3
33+	—	—	—	2

For competitors finishing outside the final elimination stage of Grand Prix and Pro Tours points are awarded depending on their score after the final Swiss round. Sixteen Swiss rounds are played at Pro Tours, 15 at individual Grand Prix, and 14 at Team Grand Prix. Pro Points are then awarded as follows.

Points	Pro Points awarded at		
Points	Pro Tour	Grand Prix (individual)	Grand Prix (teams)
39+	15	4	4
36–38	15	3	4
35	12	1	4
34	11	1	4
33	10	1	3
32	8	—	2
31	7	—	2
30	6	—	1
28–29	4	—	—
0–27	3	—	—

Finally players that participated in the World Championship earned one Pro Point per win in the Swiss Portion and two Pro Points per win in the single elimination stage.

On 31 October 2014, Wizards of the Coast revised the pro point structure and retroactively applied the changes to all events in the current season. On 2 April 2015, they further revised the threshold of Pro Players Club level, lowering the threshold required for Platinum status from 48 to 46.

On 24 April 2014, ChannelFireball, the organizer of Grand Prix Las Vegas, announced the number of pre-registered players in that Grand Prix had exceeds the 5000 threshold, and the Grand Prix main event would be split into two independent Grand Prix main events sharing same venue. Making the total number of Grand Prix in this season to 52 instead of original 51.

== Grand Prix ==
GP Portland (9–10 August 2014)

- Format: Team Limited
- Attendance: 1947 (649 teams)

1.

(United States) Reid Duke
(United States) Owen Turtenwald
(United States) William Jensen

2.

(United States) Eric Severson
(United States) Benjamin Weitz
(United States) Josiah Skallerup

3.

(United States) Matt Katz
(United States) Ben Yu
(United States) Jameson Painter

4

(United States) Eric Froehlich
(United States) Luis Scott-Vargas
(United States) Paul Cheon

GP Utrecht (9–10 August 2014)

- Format: Standard
- Attendance: 1518
1. (Austria) Oliver Polak-Rottmann
2. (France) Eliott Boussaud
3. (Germany) Richard Webels
4. (Sweden) Susanne Bornelöv
5. (Romania) Ciprian Catană
6. (Netherlands) Alex Stok
7. (France) Armel Primot
8. (Denmark) Christoffer Enggaard Larsen

GP Kobe (23–24 August 2014)

- Format: Modern
- Attendance: 2299
1. (Japan) Teruya Kakumae
2. (Japan) Yuusei Gotou
3. (Japan) Shohei Mita
4. (Japan) Yuuki Akaboshi
5. (Japan) Ken Sawada
6. (China) Bo Sun
7. (Japan) Yuuki Ichikawa
8. (Japan) Takuya Yamada

GP Sydney (23–24 August 2014)

- Format: Limited
- Attendance: 813
1. (Australia) Paul Jackson
2. (Australia) James Zhang
3. (New Zealand) Matthew Griffin
4. (Australia) Maitland Cameron
5. (Australia) Chris Sparks
6. (Japan) Tomoharu Saito
7. (South Korea) Park Jun Young
8. (Australia) Don van Ravenzwaaij

GP Shanghai (4–5 October 2014)

- Format: Limited
- Attendance: 1287
1. (China) Yu Yin
2. (China) Xu Su
3. (Japan) Tamada Ryoichi
4. (China) Han Bing
5. (Hong Kong) Zhang Meng Qiu
6. (China) Liu Yuchen
7. (South Korea) Oh Joo-hyun
8. (Japan) Shuhei Nakamura

GP Salt Lake City (6–7 September 2014)

- Format: Limited
- Attendance: 878
1. (United States) Brandon Nelson
2. (United States) Sammy Batarseh
3. (United States) Chris Woodall
4. (United States) Eric Froehlich
5. (United States) Paul Rietzl
6. (United States) Jamie Parke
7. (United States) Nathan Holiday
8. (United States) Shady Badran

GP Orlando (4–5 October 2014)

- Format: Limited
- Attendance: 2277
1. (United States) Eugene Hwang
2. (United States) Melissa DeTora
3. (United States) Sol Malka
4. (Brazil) Artur Villela
5. (United States) Pierre Mondon
6. (United States) Harry Corvese
7. (United States) Ian Farnung
8. (United States) Frank Lepore

== Pro Tour Khans of Tarkir ==
Honolulu (10–12 October 2014)

- Prize pool: $250,000
- Format: Standard, Booster Draft (Khans of Tarkir-Khans of Tarkir-Khans of Tarkir)
- Attendance: 357

=== Top 8 ===
Quarter-finals
1	Shaun McLaren	2
8	Lee Shi Tian	0
4	Mike Sigrist	2
5	Ivan Floch	0
3	Thiago Saporito	2
6	Ondřej Stráský	1
2	Ari Lax	2
7	Yuuya Watanabe	0

Semi-finals
Shaun McLaren	2
Mike Sigrist	1
Thiago Saporito	1
Ari Lax	2

Finals
Shaun McLaren	1
Ari Lax	3

=== Final standings ===
Place	Player	Prize	Pro Points	Comment
1	(United States) Ari Lax	$40,000	30	
2	(Canada) Shaun McLaren	$20,000	26	2nd final day
3	(Brazil) Thiago Saporito	$12,500	22	
4	(United States) Mike Sigrist	$12,500	22	
5	(Slovakia) Ivan Floch	$10,000	18	2nd final day
6	(Czech Republic) Ondřej Stráský	$10,000	18	
7	(Japan) Yuuya Watanabe	$10,000	18	3rd final day
8	(Hong Kong) Lee Shi Tian	$10,000	18	3rd final day

=== Pro Player of the year standings ===
Rank	Player	Pro Points
1	(United States) Ari Lax	34
2	(Canada) Shaun McLaren	29
3	(Brazil) Thiago Saporito	25
4	(United States) Mike Sigrist	22
5	(United States) Owen Turtenwald	21

== Grand Prix ==
GP Los Angeles (18–19 October 2014)

- Format: Standard
- Attendance: 1766
1. (United States) Daniel Scheid
2. (Russia) Denis Ulanov
3. (United States) Eric Pei
4. (Philippines) Carlo Falcis
5. (Japan) Ryoichi Tamada
6. (United States) Brad Nelson
7. (United States) Isaac Sears
8. (United States) Christopher Goldsmith

GP Stockholm (25–26 October 2014)

- Format: Standard
- Attendance: 1043
1. (Slovakia) Matej Zatlkaj
2. (Iceland) Einar Baldvinsson
3. (France) Thiago Rodrigues
4. (Czech Republic) Lukas Blohon
5. (Italy) Giovanni Rosi
6. (Italy) Matteo Cirigliano
7. (Germany) Christian Seibold
8. (Denmark) Alexander Pasgaard

GP Nashville (1–2 November 2014)

- Format: Team Limited
- Attendance: 1392 (464 teams)

1.

(United States) Matt Nass
(Canada) Jacob Wilson
(United States) Jesse Hampton

2.

(United States) Tom Martell
(Brazil) Paulo Vitor Damo da Rosa
(Israel) Shahar Shenhar

3.

(United States) David Sharfman
(United States) Orrin Beasley
(United States) Pat Cox

4.

(United States) Sam Black
(United States) Matt Severa
(Lithuania) Gaudenis Vidugiris

GP Santiago (1–2 November 2014)

- Format: Standard
- Attendance: 660
1. (Brazil) Eduardo dos Santos Vieira
2. (Chile) Rodrigo Soto
3. (Argentina) Nicolas de Nicola
4. (Chile) Daniel Gaete Quezada
5. (Brazil) Willy Edel
6. (Brazil) Pedro Carvalho
7. (Brazil) Fernando Barros
8. (Colombia) David Sologuren

GP Ottawa (22–23 November 2014)

- Format: Limited
- Attendance: 1353
1. (United States) Seth Manfield
2. (United States) Neal Oliver
3. (Canada) Lucas Siow
4. (Canada) Xavier Allegrucci
5. (Israel) Shahar Shenhar
6. (United States) Sam Black
7. (Canada) Pascal Maynard
8. (Canada) Jessica Buchanan

GP Madrid (15–16 November 2014)

- Format: Modern
- Attendance: 1900
1. (Austria) Immanuel Gerschenson
2. (Germany) Till Riffert
3. (Netherlands) Ricardo van den Bogaard
4. (Spain) Jose Rodriguez Pozo
5. (Portugal) Marcio Carvalho
6. (Netherlands) Kevin Grove
7. (England) Andrew Devine
8. (Netherlands) Steffen van de Veen

GP Strasbourg (29–30 November 2014)

- Format: Limited
- Attendance: 1996
1. (Hungary) Tamás Nagy
2. (France) Pierre Dagen
3. (Czech Republic) Martin Jůza
4. (Japan) Kentarou Yamamoto
5. (Ukraine) Oleg Plisov
6. (Germany) Max Pritsch
7. (Netherlands) Daan Pruijt
8. (Netherlands) Kees Van Montfoort

GP New Jersey (15–16 November 2014)

- Format: Legacy
- Attendance: 4003
1. (United States) Brian Braun-Duin
2. (United States) Tom Ross
3. (United States) Royce Walter
4. (Germany) Philipp Schonegger
5. (United States) Phillip Braverman
6. (United States) Daniel Jordan
7. (United States) Joseph Santomassino
8. (Canada) Lam Phan

GP San Antonio (29–30 November 2014)

- Format: Standard
- Attendance: 1182
1. (United States) Ryan Scullin
2. (United States) Orry Swift
3. (United States) Jeremy Frye
4. (United States) Albert Ake
5. (United States) Angel Solache
6. (United States) Larry Li
7. (United States) Randall Gay
8. (United States) Gareth Aye

== Magic: The Gathering World Championship ==
Nice (2–7 December 2014)

- Prize pool: $150,000
- Format: Vintage Masters Booster Draft, Standard, Khans of Tarkir Booster Draft, Modern
  - Vintage Masters "packs" will be generated by Magic Online exclusively for event's use.
- Attendance: 24

=== Top 4 playoff ===
Semifinals
1	Yuuya Watanabe	1
4	Shahar Shenhar	3
2	Patrick Chapin	3
3	Kentaro Yamamoto	0

Finals
Shahar Shenhar	3
Patrick Chapin	0

=== Final standings ===
The following twenty-four players received an invitation to the 2014 World Championship due to their performance in the 2013–14 season. They are ordered according to the final standings of the event.

#	Player	Prize	Pro points	Qualified due to
1	(Israel) Shahar Shenhar	$50,000	13	2013 World Champion
2	(United States) Patrick Chapin	$20,000	12	Pro Tour Journey into Nyx winner
3	(Japan) Yuuya Watanabe	$10,000	10	Pro Point leader Japan
4	(Japan) Kentarou Yamamoto	$10,000	9	8th most Pro Points of otherwise unqualified
5	(Canada) Shaun McLaren	$5,000	9	Pro Tour Born of the Gods winner
6	(Japan) Yuuki Ichikawa	$5,000	8	Pro Point runner-up Japan
7	(Slovakia) Ivan Floch	$5,000	8	Pro Tour Magic 2015 winner
8	(United States) William Jensen	$5,000	8	Most Pro Points of otherwise unqualified
9	(United States) Sam Black	$3,000	8	6th most Pro Points of otherwise unqualified
10	(Thailand) Lars Dam	$3,000	7	2013 Magic Online Champion
11	(United States) Josh Utter-Leyton	$3,000	7	3rd most Pro Points of otherwise unqualified
12	(United States) Paul Rietzl	$3,000	7	5th most Pro Points of otherwise unqualified
13	(United States) Owen Turtenwald	$3,000	7	Pro Point leader North America
14	(United States) Reid Duke	$3,000	7	Pro Point runner-up North America
15	(Czech Republic) Stanislav Cifka	$3,000	6	2nd most Pro Points of otherwise unqualified
16	(United States) Tom Martell	$3,000	6	4th most Pro Points of otherwise unqualified
17	(France) Raphaël Lévy	$2,000	6	2013 World Magic Cup winner
18	(France) Jérémy Dezani	$2,000	6	2013–14 Player of the Year
19	(Canada) Jacob Wilson	$2,000	6	7th most Pro Points of otherwise unqualified
20	(Brazil) Willy Edel	$2,000	5	Pro Point leader Latin America
21	(South Korea) Nam Sung-Wook	$2,000	5	Pro Point runner-up APAC region
22	(United States) Raymond Perez Jr.	$2,000	5	2013–14 Rookie of the Year
23	(Brazil) Paulo Vitor Damo da Rosa	$2,000	4	Pro Point runner-up Latin America
24	(Hong Kong) Lee Shi Tian	$2,000	4	Pro Point leader APAC region

== World Magic Cup ==
Nice (5–7 December 2014)

- Prize pool: $250,000
- Format: Team Constructed, Team Limited
- Attendance: 72 teams

=== Top 8 ===
Quarter-finals
1	South Korea	1
8	Greece	2
4	Slovakia	0
5	United States	2
3	Serbia	0
6	Denmark	2
2	England	2
7	Brazil	0

Semi-finals
Greece	2
United States	1
Denmark	2
England	1

Finals
Greece	1
Denmark	2

=== Final standings ===
Place	Country	Player	Prize	Pro Points
1	Denmark	Martin Müller	$12,000	8
1	Denmark	Simon Nielsen	$12,000	8
1	Denmark	Thomas Enevoldsen	$12,000	8
1	Denmark	Lars Birch	$12,000	8
2	Greece	Marios Angelopoulos	$6,500	7
2	Greece	Bill Chronopoulos	$6,500	7
2	Greece	Panagiotis Savvidis	$6,500	7
2	Greece	Socrates Rozakeas	$6,500	7
3	England	Fabrizio Anteri	$4,000	6
3	England	David Inglis	$4,000	6
3	England	Francesco Giorgio	$4,000	6
3	England	Riccardo Reale	$4,000	6
4	United States	Owen Turtenwald	$4,000	6
4	United States	Isaac Sears	$4,000	6
4	United States	Andrew Baeckstrom	$4,000	6
4	United States	Neal Oliver	$4,000	6

Place	Country	Player	Prize	Pro Points
5	South Korea	Nam Sung-wook	$2,000	5
5	South Korea	Oh Joon-hyun	$2,000	5
5	South Korea	Cho Jeong-woo	$2,000	5
5	South Korea	Kim Sang-eun	$2,000	5
6	Serbia	Aleksa Telarov	$2,000	5
6	Serbia	Miodrag Kitanovic	$2,000	5
6	Serbia	Boris Bajgo	$2,000	5
6	Serbia	Milos Stajic	$2,000	5
7	Slovakia	Ivan Floch	$2,000	5
7	Slovakia	Jan Tomcani	$2,000	5
7	Slovakia	Michal Guldan	$2,000	5
7	Slovakia	Matej Zatlkaj	$2,000	5
8	Brazil	Willy Edel	$2,000	5
8	Brazil	Gabriel Fehr	$2,000	5
8	Brazil	Thiago Saporito	$2,000	5
8	Brazil	Matheus Rosseto	$2,000	5

=== Pro Player of the year standings ===
Rank	Player	Pro Points
1	(Canada) Shaun McLaren	40
2	(United States) Owen Turtenwald	39
3	(United States) Ari Lax	38
3	(Slovakia) Ivan Floch	38
5	(Israel) Shahar Shenhar	36

== Grand Prix ==
GP Baltimore (13–14 December 2014)

- Format: Limited
- Attendance: 1235
1. (United States) Gerard Fabiano
2. (United States) David Foster
3. (United States) Harry Bradford
4. (United States) Ben Stark
5. (United States) Chris Fennell
6. (United States) Craig Wescoe
7. (United States) Timothy Wu
8. (United States) Josh Utter-Leyton

GP Manila (3–4 January 2015)

- Format: Standard
- Attendance:1410
1. (Australia) Joseph Sclauzero
2. (Taiwan) Kuo Tzu-Ching
3. (Hong Kong) Lee Shi Tian
4. (Japan) Makihito Mihara
5. (South Korea) Won Dae-hoon
6. (United States) Christian Calcano
7. (Czech Republic) Martin Jůza
8. (Philippines) Arnulfo Taghoy, Jr.

GP Mexico City (31 January–1 February 2015)

- Format: Limited
- Attendance: 641
1. (Canada) Pascal Maynard
2. (Mexico) Mario Flores
3. (Singapore) Chapman Sim
4. (Mexico) Andreas Canavati
5. (Mexico) Axel Martinez
6. (Mexico) Juan Carlos Botis
7. (Czech Republic) Martin Jůza
8. (Brazil) Eduardo dos Santos Viera

GP Milan (13–14 December 2014)

- Format: Modern
- Attendance: 1760
1. (Sweden) Magnus Lantto
2. (Italy) Niccolo Belini
3. (Poland) Piotr Glogowski
4. (France) Louis Deltour
5. (Costa Rica) Miguel Gatica
6. (England) Eduardo Sajgalik
7. (Italy) Lucantonio Salvidio
8. (Italy) Dario Parazzoli

GP Omaha (10–11 January 2015)

- Format: Modern
- Attendance: 1168
1. (United States) Erik Peter
2. (United States) Stephen Speck
3. (Canada) Pascal Maynard
4. (United States) Jonathan Paton
5. (United States) Zac Roorda
6. (United States) Scott Lipp
7. (United States) Andrew Elenbogen
8. (United States) Stephen Berrios

GP San Jose (31 January–1 February 2015)

- Format: Team Limited
- Attendance: 1968 (656 teams)

1.

(United States) Eric Froehlich
(United States) Luis Scott-Vargas
(United States) Paul Cheon

2.

(United States) Matthew Sperling
(United States) David Williams
(United States) Paul Rietzl

3.

(United States) Ari Lax
(United States) Chris Fennell
(United States) Craig Wescoe

4.

(Canada) Robert Smith
(Canada) Sean Gifford
(Canada) Tyler Blum

GP Denver (3–4 January 2015)

- Format: Standard
- Attendance: 1536
1. (United States) Andrew Brown
2. (United States) Matthew Sperling
3. (United States) Sam Pardee
4. (Austria) Valentin Mackl
5. (Vietnam) Edward Nguyen
6. (United States) William Jensen
7. (United States) Paul Cheon
8. (United States) Lukas Parsons

GP Shizuoka (10–11 January 2015)

- Format: Limited
- Attendance: 2236
1. (Japan) Akito Shinoda
2. (China) Bo Sun
3. (Japan) Chihiro Kawada
4. (Japan) Yuuki Ichikawa
5. (Japan) Yuki Matsumoto
6. (Japan) Satoshi Yamaguchi
7. (Japan) Junichi Yabuta
8. (Japan) Shinji Nakano

== Pro Tour Fate Reforged ==
Washington, D.C. (6–8 February 2015)

- Prize pool: $250,000
- Format: Modern, Booster Draft
- Attendance: 407

=== Top 8 ===
Quarter-finals
1	Eric Froehlich	1
8	Jesse Hampton	2
4	Seth Manfield	1
5	Justin Cohen	2
3	Jelger Wiegersma	2
6	Jacob Wilson	1
2	Antonio Del Moral Leon	2
7	Lee Shi Tian	1

Semi-finals
Jesse Hampton	1
Justin Cohen	2
Jelger Wiegersma	1
Antonio Del Moral Leon	2

Finals
Justin Cohen	1
Antonio Del Moral Leon	3

=== Final standings ===
Place	Player	Prize	Pro Points	Comment
1	(Spain) Antonio Del Moral Leon	$40,000	30	1st Spanish player to win a Pro Tour
2	(United States) Justin Cohen	$20,000	26	Pro Tour debut
3	(Netherlands) Jelger Wiegersma	$12,500	22	5th final day
4	(United States) Jesse Hampton	$12,500	22	2nd final day
5	(United States) Eric Froehlich	$10,000	18	4th final day
6	(United States) Seth Manfield	$10,000	18	
7	(Canada) Jacob Wilson	$10,000	18	2nd final day
8	(Hong Kong) Lee Shi Tian	$10,000	18	4th final day

=== Pro Player of the year standings ===
Rank	Player	Pro Points
1	(Hong Kong) Lee Shi Tian	53
2	(United States) Eric Froehlich	50
3	(United States) Owen Turtenwald	49
4	(United States) Ari Lax	48
5	(Israel) Shahar Shenhar	45

== Grand Prix ==
GP Seville (14–15 February 2015)

- Format: Standard
- Attendance: 799
1. (Austria) Immanuel Gerschenson
2. (France) Pierre Sommen
3. (Spain) Carlos Ballester Garcia
4. (Guernsey) Nicholas Merrien
5. (Czech Republic) Martin Jůza
6. (Portugal) Marcio Carvalho
7. (Spain) Marcos Cordero Valle
8. (France) Alexandre Habert

GP Liverpool (7–8 March 2015)

- Format: Limited
- Attendance: 1797
1. (Denmark) Martin Dang
2. (Germany) Nikolas Labahn
3. (Czech Republic) Lukas Blohon
4. (Portugal) Marcio Carvalho
5. (Sweden) Andreas Jonsson
6. (Norway) Kenneth Ellingsen
7. (Switzerland) Daniel Oppliger
8. (France) Timothée Simonot

GP Cleveland (14–15 March 2015)

- Format: Limited
- Attendance: 1771
1. (Canada) Bill Tsang
2. (United States) Jake Mondello
3. (United States) Gerard Fabiano
4. (United States) Andrew Cuneo
5. (United States) Eric Blanchet
6. (United States) Christian Calcano
7. (Japan) Yuuya Watanabe
8. (United States) Ross Merriam

GP Memphis (21–22 February 2015)

- Format: Standard
- Attendance: 1075
1. (United States) Jack Fogle
2. (United States) Ben Stark
3. (United States) Brad Nelson
4. (United States) Steve Rubin
5. (United States) Patrick Crowe
6. (United States) Chris Fennel
7. (United States) Alex Majlaton
8. (United States) Eric Rath

GP Miami (7–8 March 2015)

- Format: Standard
- Attendance: 1380
1. (United States) Daniel Cecchetti
2. (United States) Corey Baumeister
3. (United States) Chad Kastel
4. (United States) Ralph Betesh
5. (United States) Ryan Grodzinski
6. (United States) Brian Lee
7. (United States) Andy Boswell
8. (United States) Zan Syed

GP Vancouver (21–22 February 2015)

- Format: Modern
- Attendance: 1116
1. (Canada) Dan Lanthier
2. (Canada) Robbie Schmidt
3. (Germany) Florian Koch
4. (Canada) Alexander Hayne
5. (United States) Tom Martell
6. (United States) Stephen Speck
7. (Canada) Jesse Moulton
8. (United States) Daniel Ward

GP Auckland (14–15 March 2015)

- Format: Limited
- Attendance: 383
1. (Japan) Teruya Kakumae
2. (Australia) Maitland Cameron
3. (Germany) Fabian Dickmann
4. (Australia) John Brugman
5. (New Zealand) Dylan Goldsmith
6. (South Africa) Jacques van Eeden
7. (China) Yifan Wei
8. (New Zealand) Jason Chung

== Pro Tour Dragons of Tarkir ==
Brussels (10–12 April 2015)

- Prize pool: $250,000
- Format: Standard, Booster Draft
- Attendance: 407

=== Top 8 ===
Quarter-finals
1	Ondřej Stráský	2
8	Andrew Ohlschwager	0
4	Jason Chung	1
5	Shouta Yasooka	2
3	Martin Dang	2
6	Marco Cammilluzzi	0
2	Adrian Sullivan	2
7	Thomas Hendriks	1

Semi-finals
Ondřej Stráský	1
Shouta Yasooka	2
Martin Dang	2
Adrian Sullivan	0

Finals
Shouta Yasooka	1
Martin Dang	3

=== Final standings ===
Place	Player	Prize	Pro Points	Comment
1	(Denmark) Martin Dang	$40,000	30	1st Dane to win a Pro Tour
2	(Japan) Shouta Yasooka	$20,000	26	2nd final day
3	(Czech Republic) Ondřej Stráský	$12,500	22	2nd final day
4	(United States) Adrian Sullivan	$12,500	22	
5	(New Zealand) Jason Chung	$10,000	18	1st New Zealander in a Top 8
6	(Italy) Marco Cammilluzzi	$10,000	18	
7	(Netherlands) Thomas Hendriks	$10,000	18	
8	(United States) Andrew Ohlschwager	$10,000	18	

=== Pro Player of the year standings ===
Rank	Player	Pro Points
1	(United States) Eric Froehlich	60
2	(United States) Sam Black	57
3	(Hong Kong) Lee Shi Tian	56
4	(United States) Ari Lax	54
5	(United States) Owen Turtenwald	53

== Grand Prix ==
GP Kraków (18–19 April 2015)

- Format: Standard
- Attendance: 1149
1. (Canada) Alexander Hayne
2. (Slovenia) Robin Dolar
3. (Brazil) Paulo Vitor Damo da Rosa
4. (Poland) Bartłomiej Lewandowski
5. (Denmark) Martin Müller
6. (Germany) Alex Hottmann
7. (France) Leo Schulhof
8. (United States) Samuel Pardee

GP Toronto (2–3 May 2015)

- Format: Standard
- Attendance: 1613
1. (Canada) Lucas Siow
2. (Canada) Edgar Magalhaes
3. (United States) Mark Jacobson
4. (United States) Brad Nelson
5. (United States) Ben Feingersh
6. (United States) Benjamin Weitz
7. (Canada) Dan Fournier
8. (United States) Craig Wescoe

GP Florence (16–17 May 2015)

- Format: Team Limited
- Attendance: 1296 (432 teams)

1.

(Germany) Frank Schäfer
(Germany) Rosario Maij
(Germany) Adrian Rosada

2.

(Germany) Jasper Grimmer
(Germany) Robin Steinborn
(Germany) Amit Cohen

3.

(England) Dan Gardener
(England) Marco Orsini-Jones
(England) Matteo Orsini-Jones

4.

(England) Daniel Royde
(England) Eduardo Sajgalik
(England) Fabrizio Anteri

GP Kyoto (18–19 April 2015)

- Format: Legacy
- Attendance: 2027
1. (Japan) Yuuta Takahashi
2. (Japan) Kazuya Murakami
3. (Japan) Kenta Harane
4. (Japan) Kai Thiele
5. (Japan) Yukihiro Satake
6. (Japan) Yousuke Morinaga
7. (Japan) Shouta Yasooka
8. (Japan) Kei Umehara

GP Atlantic City (9–10 May 2015)

- Format: Limited
- Attendance: 1655
1. (United States) Christian Calcano
2. (Canada) Alexander Hayne
3. (Canada) Jacob Wilson
4. (United States) Bryan Gottlieb
5. (United States) Stephen Neal
6. (United States) Luis Scott-Vargas
7. (Lithuania) Gaudenis Vidugiris
8. (United States) Zachary Jesse

GP Shanghai (16–17 May 2015)

- Format: Standard
- Attendance: 964
1. (Japan) Yuuki Ichikawa
2. (Malaysia) Devsharan Singh
3. (South Korea) Nam Sung-wook
4. (China) Hu Jin
5. (China) Xie Hao Chen
6. (China) Yang Dehua
7. (Taiwan) Lin Yang
8. (China) Bo Li

GP São Paulo (2–3 May 2015)

- Format: Standard
- Attendance: 1390
1. (Brazil) Paulo Vitor Damo da Rosa
2. (Chile) Maximiliano Sanchez Pinnilo
3. (Chile) Sergio Barrientos Ochoa
4. (Brazil) Mateus Batista de Melo
5. (Chile) Claudio Barriento Ochoa
6. (Brazil) Leonardo Oliveria Graichen
7. (Argentina) Mariano Cartechino
8. (Brazil) Ricardo Nunes Martins

GP Paris (9–10 May 2015)

- Format: Standard
- Attendance: 1426
1. (Belgium) Amand Dosimont
2. (United States) Zan Syed
3. (Spain) Antonio Del Moral Leon
4. (South Korea) Kim Kyoung-soo
5. (France) Tristan Pölzl
6. (Germany) Christian Hauck
7. (Germany) Jasper Grimmer
8. (Portugal) Hugo Diniz

GP Las Vegas 1 (30–31 May 2015)

- Format: Limited
- Attendance: 3687
1. (United States) Aaron Lewis
2. (United States) Lucas Duchow
3. (Canada) Pascal Maynard
4. (United States) David Jetha
5. (United States) Ben Stark
6. (United States) Andrew Lozano
7. (United States) Peter Maginnis
8. (Philippines) Marcel Dizon

GP Las Vegas 2 (30–31 May 2015)

- Format: Limited
- Attendance: 3864
1. (United States) Scott Markeson
2. (United States) David Heineman
3. (United States) Simon Kim
4. (United States) Danny Goldstein
5. (Brazil) Pedro Carvalho
6. (Canada) Shaun McLaren
7. (United States) Eugen Koo
8. (United States) Brian Richards

GP Charlotte (13–14 June 2015)

- Format: Modern
- Attendance: 2870
1. (United States) Michael Malone
2. (United States) Wesley See
3. (United States) Andrew Wagoner
4. (United States) Darien Elderfield
5. (United States) Zachary Jesse
6. (United States) Ian Bosley
7. (United States) Samuel Pardee
8. (United States) Donald Smith

GP Singapore (27–28 June 2015)

- Format: Modern
- Attendance: 1130
1. (Japan) Hitomi Masaki
2. (Singapore) Steven Tan
3. (Japan) Keita Kawasaki
4. (United States) Reid Duke
5. (Singapore) Wei Song Ray Wee
6. (Japan) Yuuta Takahashi
7. (Singapore) Tay Jun Hao
8. (Singapore) Zhijian Yang

GP Lille (4–5 July 2015)

- Format: Legacy
- Attendance: 1548
1. (Italy) Claudio Bonanni
2. (France) Olivier Ruel
3. (Spain) Ricardo Sánchez
4. (Germany) Christoph Alsheimer
5. (Belgium) Thomas Van der Paelt
6. (Czech Republic) Petr Sochůrek
7. (England) Alex Mortimer
8. (Czech Republic) Jaroslav Bouček

GP Utrecht (30–31 May 2015)

- Format: Limited
- Attendance: 3613
1. (Italy) Davide Vergoni
2. (Germany) Lars Rosengren
3. (Netherlands) Iwan Smit
4. (Germany) Christian Seibold
5. (Belgium) Branco Neirynck
6. (Sweden) Christian Åhlström
7. (Germany) Fabian Dickmann
8. (Germany) David Joachim

GP Providence (20–21 June 2015)

- Format: Standard
- Attendance: 1053
1. (United States) Sky Mason
2. (United States) Neal Sacks
3. (United States) Eric Severson
4. (Brazil) Pedro Carvalho
5. (United States) Steve Rubin
6. (United States) Raeef Istfan
7. (United States) Oliver Tiu
8. (United States) Josh McClain

GP Buenos Aires (27–28 June 2015)

- Format: Standard
- Attendance: 705
1. (Canada) Pascal Maynard
2. (Brazil) Marcos Paulo de Jesus Freitas
3. (Brazil) Fabio Ancelmo
4. (Brazil) Thales Santos Navarro
5. (Argentina) Nicolas De Nicola
6. (Argentina) Renzo Chiappa
7. (Chile) Rodrigo Soto Sanchez
8. (Argentina) Facundo Conde

GP Dallas (25–26 July 2015)

- Format: Limited
- Attendance: 1671
1. (Japan) Shuhei Nakamura
2. (United States) Ross Merriam
3. (United States) Dan Jordan
4. (United States) Nathaniel Smith
5. (United States) Aryeh Wiznitzer
6. (Sweden) Joel Larsson
7. (United States) Greg Orange
8. (United States) David Ochoa

GP Chiba (30–31 May 2015)

- Format: Limited
- Attendance: 3551
1. (Japan) Yuki Matsumoto
2. (Japan) Junya Iyanaga
3. (Japan) Shougo Sunada
4. (Japan) Katsuhiro Mori
5. (Japan) Ichiro Matsubara
6. (Japan) Kim Minsu
7. (Indonesia) Albert Budisanjaya
8. (Japan) Ryouta Shimizu

GP Copenhagen (20–21 June 2015)

- Format: Modern
- Attendance: 1337
1. (Poland) Przemek Knocinski
2. (Luxembourg) Steve Hatto
3. (Portugal) Marcio Carvalho
4. (Denmark) Christoffer Larsen
5. (France) Thiago Rodrigues
6. (France) Arnaud Hocquemiller
7. (Belgium) Branco Neirynck
8. (Denmark) Hans Christian Ljungquist

GP Montreal (4–5 July 2015)

- Format: Limited
- Attendance: 1220
1. (United States) Mike Sigrist
2. (Canada) David Goldfarb
3. (Canada) Martin-Eric Gauthier
4. (Netherlands) Jelger Wiegersma
5. (United States) Adam Waksman
6. (United States) Reid Duke
7. (Canada) Gautier Cousin
8. (Canada) Stephen Whelan

== Pro Tour Magic Origins ==
Vancouver (31 July–2 August 2015)

- Prize pool: $250,000
- Format: Standard, Booster Draft
- Attendance: 391

=== Top 8 ===
Quarter-finals
1	Kentaro Yamamoto	0
8	Mike Sigrist	2
4	Stephen Berrios	1
5	Paul Jackson	2
3	Pat Cox	1
6	Matthew Sperling	2
2	Stephen Neal	1
7	Joel Larsson	2

Semi-finals
Mike Sigrist	2
Paul Jackson	0
Matthew Sperling	0
Joel Larsson	2

Finals
Mike Sigrist	2
Joel Larsson	3

=== Final standings ===
Place	Player	Prize	Pro Points	Comment
1	(Sweden) Joel Larsson	$40,000	30	2nd Final Day
2	(United States) Mike Sigrist	$20,000	26	2nd Final Day
3	(Australia) Paul Jackson	$12,500	22	
4	(United States) Matthew Sperling	$12,500	22	2nd Final Day
5	(Japan) Kentaro Yamamoto	$10,000	18	3rd Final Day
6	(United States) Stephen Neal	$10,000	18	
7	(United States) Pat Cox	$10,000	18	3rd Final Day
8	(United States) Stephen Berrios	$10,000	18	

== Pro Player of the Year final standings ==
The 2014–15 Pro Tour season ended after Pro Tour Magic Origins. These are the final standings of the Player of the Year race, including every player who at the end of the season reached Platinum, the highest Pro Club Level.

Place	Player	Pro Points	Place	Player	Pro Points	Place	Player	Pro Points
1	(United States) Mike Sigrist	73	13	(United States) Owen Turtenwald	55	25	(Netherlands) Jelger Wiegersma	50
2	(United States) Eric Froehlich	71	13	(United States) Steve Rubin	55	25	(Slovakia) Ivan Floch	50
3	(United States) Sam Black	63	15	(United States) Andrew Cuneo	54	27	(Brazil) Thiago Saporito	49
3	(Hong Kong) Lee Shi Tian	63	15	(Canada) Jacob Wilson	54	27	(United States) Ben Stark	49
5	(United States) Brad Nelson	61	15	(Spain) Antonio Del Moral Leon	54	29	(Japan) Shouta Yasooka	47
6	(United States) Seth Manfield	60	15	(Israel) Shahar Shenhar	54	29	(United States) Nathan Holiday	47
6	(United States) Ari Lax	60	19	(United States) Josh Utter-Leyton	53	29	(United States) William Jensen	47
8	(United States) Paul Rietzl	59	20	(United States) Matthew Sperling	52	29	(United States) Reid Duke	47
8	(Japan) Yuuya Watanabe	59	20	(Japan) Kentaro Yamamoto	52	33	(United States) Craig Wescoe	46
10	(Canada) Shaun McLaren	58	20	(Canada) Alexander Hayne	52	33	(Portugal) Marcio Carvalho	46
11	(Sweden) Joel Larsson	57	23	(New Zealand) Jason Chung	51			
12	(Czech Republic) Ondřej Stráský	56	23	(Brazil) Paulo Vitor Damo da Rosa	51			

== Invitees to the 2015 World Championship ==
The following twenty-four players received an invitation to the 2015 World Championship due to their performance in the 2014–15 season.

Player	Qualified due to
(United States) Mike Sigrist	2014–15 Player of the Year
(Canada) Alexander Hayne	2014–15 Grand Prix Player of the Year
(Israel) Shahar Shenhar	2014 World Champion
(Denmark) Martin Müller	2014 World Magic Cup winner
(Sweden) Magnus Lantto	2014 Magic Online Champion
(United States) Ari Lax	Pro Tour Khans of Tarkir winner
(Spain) Antonio del Moral Leon	Pro Tour Fate Reforged winner
(Denmark) Martin Dang	Pro Tour Dragons of Tarkir winner
(Sweden) Joel Larsson	Pro Tour Magic Origins winner
(United States) Eric Froehlich	2nd Most Pro Points North America
(United States) Sam Black	3rd most Pro Points North America
(United States) Brad Nelson	4th most Pro Points North America
(Brazil) Paulo Vitor Damo da Rosa	Most Pro Points Latin America
(Brazil) Thiago Saporito	2nd Most Pro Point Latin America
(Hong Kong) Lee Shi Tian	Most Pro Points APAC region
(Japan) Yuuya Watanabe	2nd Most Pro Points APAC region
(Japan) Kentaro Yamamoto	3rd Most Pro Points APAC region
(Czech Republic) Ondřej Stráský	Most Pro Points Europe
(United States) Seth Manfield	Most Pro Points of otherwise unqualified
(United States) Paul Rietzl	2nd most Pro Points of otherwise unqualified
(Canada) Shaun McLaren	3rd most Pro Points of otherwise unqualified
(United States) Owen Turtenwald	4th most Pro Points of otherwise unqualified
(United States) Steve Rubin	5th most Pro Points of otherwise unqualified
(Canada) Jacob Wilson	6th most Pro Points of otherwise unqualified
