= Ari Lax =

American Magic: The Gathering player

- Nationality: United States
- Pro Tour debut: Pro Tour Kyoto 2009
- Winnings: US$75,805
- Pro Tour wins (Top 8): 1 (1)
- Grand Prix wins (Top 8): 1 (9)
- Lifetime Pro Points: 209
- Planeswalker Level: 48 (Archmage)

Ari Michael Lax is an American Magic: The Gathering player. Best known for winning the 2014 Pro Tour Khans of Tarkir, Lax's resume includes nine Grand Prix top eights including one win.

== Achievements ==
Season	Event type	Location	Format	Date	Rank
2009	Grand Prix	Seattle	Standard	30–31 May 2009	8
2010	Grand Prix	Nashville	Limited	20–21 November 2010	2
2011	Grand Prix	Atlanta	Extended	22–23 January 2011	5
2012–13	Grand Prix	Atlantic City	Standard	12–13 January 2013	4
2013–14	Grand Prix	Providence	Team Limited	8–9 June 2013	2
2013–14	Grand Prix	Kansas City	Modern	6–7 July 2013	6
2013–14	Grand Prix	Toronto	Limited	30 November–1 December 2013	1
2014–15	Pro Tour	Honolulu	Standard and Booster Draft	10–12 October 2014	1
2014–15	Grand Prix	San Jose	Team Limited	31 January–1 February 2015	3
2014–15	Grand Prix	Milwaukee	Standard	10–11 December 2016	5

Last updated: 12 December 2016
Source: Wizards.com
