= Grand Prix (Magic: The Gathering) =

Professional Magic: The Gathering tournaments

Grands Prix (GPs) were professional Magic: The Gathering tournaments, awarding cash prizes, Pro Points and invitations to Pro Tours. They were open to all players and were usually the biggest Magic tournaments by participant count. The first Grand Prix was held on 22–23 March 1997 in Amsterdam (Netherlands). Until their cancellation, 702 Grand Prix events were held, the biggest being GP Las Vegas 2015 with 7,551 competitors, making it the biggest trading card game tournament held at the time.

Grand Prix tournaments were the main event of a minimum three-day mini-convention. The term "Grand Prix" could refer to either the tournament or to the entire weekend. Starting in 2019, as part of a broader re-branding, the term MagicFest was introduced to refer to the overall event, which includes both the Grand Prix main event and a number of Side Events, which last for only a few hours and which have comparatively smaller prize pools. Due to the global COVID-19 pandemic, Grand Prix events were cancelled in 2020. Due to, during the pandemic years, Wizards of the Coast deciding to move the marketing and focus of the game away from competitive play towards the much larger 'casual', often multiplayer-focused audience, Grand Prix events have not returned. However, on 20th August 2024, Wizards of the Coast announced a new tournament series called Magic Spotlight Series, starting in 2025. They are open events with a $50,000 price pool, also rewarding the top 8 finishers with a Pro Tour invitation, so they can be seen as spiritual successors for the Grand Prix series.

== History ==
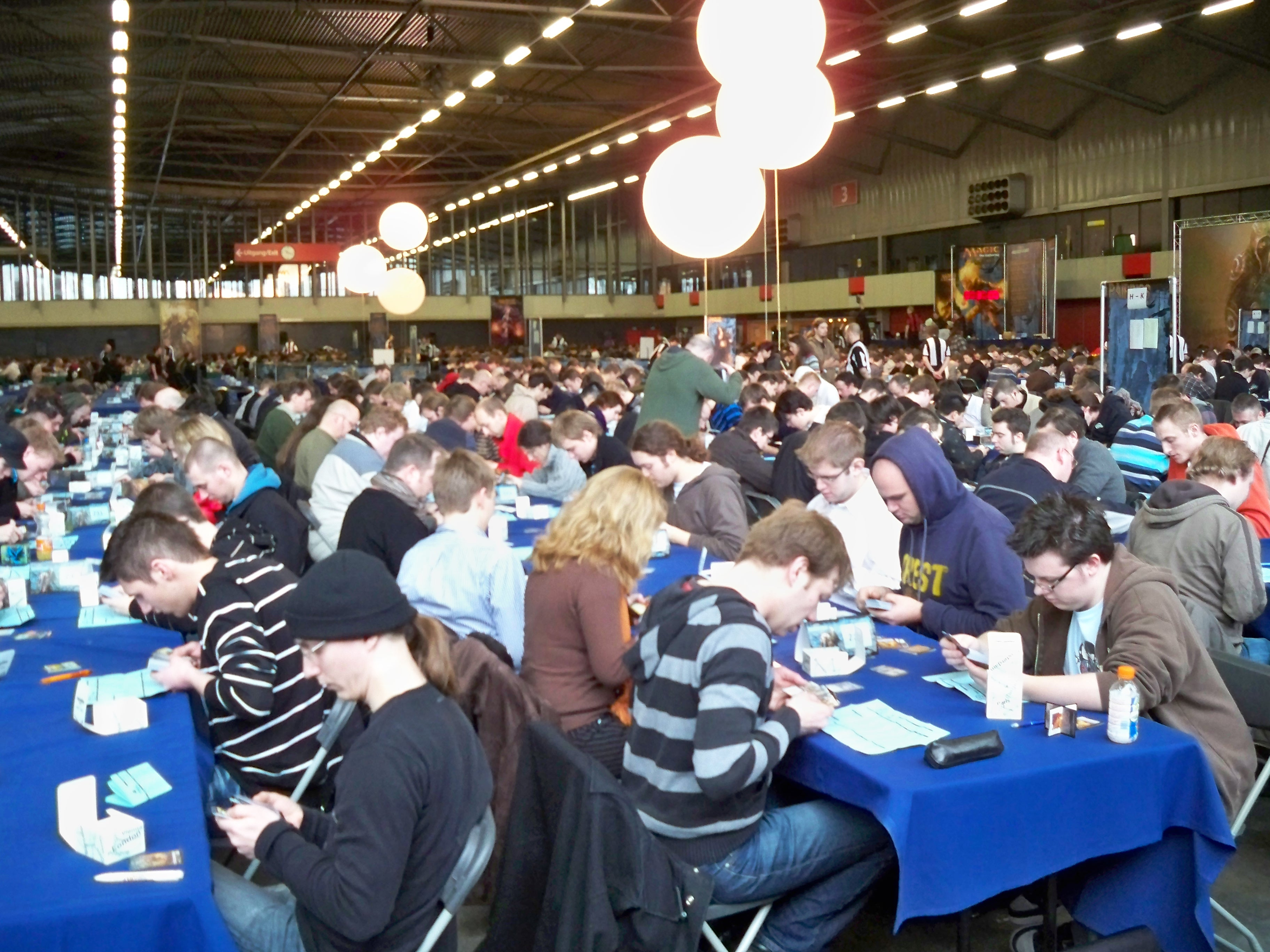
Grand Prix Rotterdam 2009

The first Grand Prix was in 1997. Unlike the invitation-only Pro Tour, GPs were open to all players. The first Grand Prix was held in Amsterdam and it was also the first professional Magic tournament held outside the United States. The total prize pool was $30,000, compared to $250,000 at Pro Tour Paris a few weeks later. The scheduling of Grand Prix events varied over time, with 20 to 30 events per year in the 1990s growing to 50-60 events per year towards the end of the Grand Prix structure. Grand Prix main events are often quite large. The 2015 event in Las Vegas, Nevada, had over 7,500 contestants participate. The event had to be divided in two parts.

== Tournament structure ==
With the exception of some Grands Prix that had multiple main events, most were two day tournaments, taking place on weekends. The day prior to the start of the event (usually Friday) hosted a number of side events, including Last Chance Trials. Competitors who won a Last Chance Trial received a two-round bye to the Grand Prix, which could otherwise only be earned through having a certain number of Pro Points or Planeswalker Points. On Day 1 (usually Saturday), the tournament began using the Swiss tournament structure. The exact number of rounds varied over the history of GPs, mostly eight or nine rounds were played on Day 1. After the 8th round, a cut was performed. All competitors with a record of 6 wins and 2 losses or better were allowed to continue playing. Despite taking place after the cut, the ninth round was still played on Day 1 at Limited tournaments for logistical reasons.

On Day 2, play continued for an additional six or seven rounds (again, depending on the format). At the conclusion of the Swiss rounds, the eight players with the best records advanced to the single-elimination Top 8.

For Grands Prix played in a Constructed format all rounds were played with the same decks. Limited Grands Prix had a Sealed Deck portion on day 1 and Booster Drafts on day 2.

== Prizes ==
Grands Prix awarded cash prizes, Pro Points, and invitations to a Pro Tour. The best eight competitors (or best four teams for team Grand Prix) - or all players with at least 39 match points at the end of the tournament, whichever is greater - received an invitation to a previously determined Pro Tour. Cash prizes varied considerably, ranging from $10,000 to $75,000. From 2013 to 2018, prize payout varied based on the number of competitors. In 2019, a system was introduced where the prize payout varied based on expected attendance (from $35,000 to $80,000), but was always announced in advance, to allow competitors to know that information when deciding which events to travel to. The upcoming Magic Spotlight Series will have a $50,000 total prize pool, with "the lion's share" going to the winner.

Of the total prize pool, the champion received between $6,000 and $10,000. As many as 225 players could receive prizes, of $200 or more.

== See also ==
- The DCI
- Pro Tour
- List of all GPs
