= Gaudenis Vidugiris =

American Magic: The Gathering player

- Nationality: American/ Lithuanian
- Pro Tour debut: Pro Tour Yokohama 2007
- Winnings: $100,585
- Pro Tour wins (Top 8): 0 (2)
- Grand Prix wins (Top 8): 3 (8)
- Median Pro Tour Finish: 118
- Lifetime Pro Points: 262

Gaudenis Vidugiris is an American professional Magic: The Gathering player. His career highlights include three Grand Prix wins, and a second-place finish at Pro Tour Avacyn Restored in 2012. Though a resident of New York, Vidugiris has played for the Lithuanian national team a number of times.

== Achievements ==
Season	Event type	Location	Format	Date	Rank
2008	Grand Prix	Indianapolis	Sealed and Booster Draft	21–22 June 2008	2
2008	Nationals	Lithuania	Standard and Booster Draft		3
2009	Grand Prix	Hanover	Extended	13–14 March 2009	2
2009	Grand Prix	Niigata	Sealed and Booster Draft	29–30 August 2009	7
2009	Grand Prix	Tampa Bay	Sealed and Booster Draft	24–25 October 2009	1
2011	Grand Prix	Denver	Sealed and Booster Draft	19–20 February 2011	1
2011	Pro Tour	Nagoya	Block Constructed and Booster Draft	10–12 June 2011	6
2012	Pro Tour	Barcelona	Block Constructed and Booster Draft	11–13 May 2012	2
2012–13	Grand Prix	Atlanta	Limited	30 June–1 July 2012	1
2014–15	Grand Prix	Nashville	Team Limited	1–2 November 2014	4
2014–15	Grand Prix	Atlantic City	Limited	9–10 May 2015	7

Last updated: 11 May 2015
Source: wizards.com

Other accomplishments

- Lithuanian national champion 2012, 2013, 2014

== Disqualification ==
Vidugiris was disqualified from Pro Tour Dublin in Round 1 for Unsporting Conduct – Cheating. Vidugiris was found to be covering up an incorrectly drawn number of cards to begin a game.

Preceded by Tomas Sukaitis	Magic Lithuanian National Champion; 2012–2014	Succeeded by Incumbent
