= Luis Scott-Vargas =

American Magic: The Gathering player

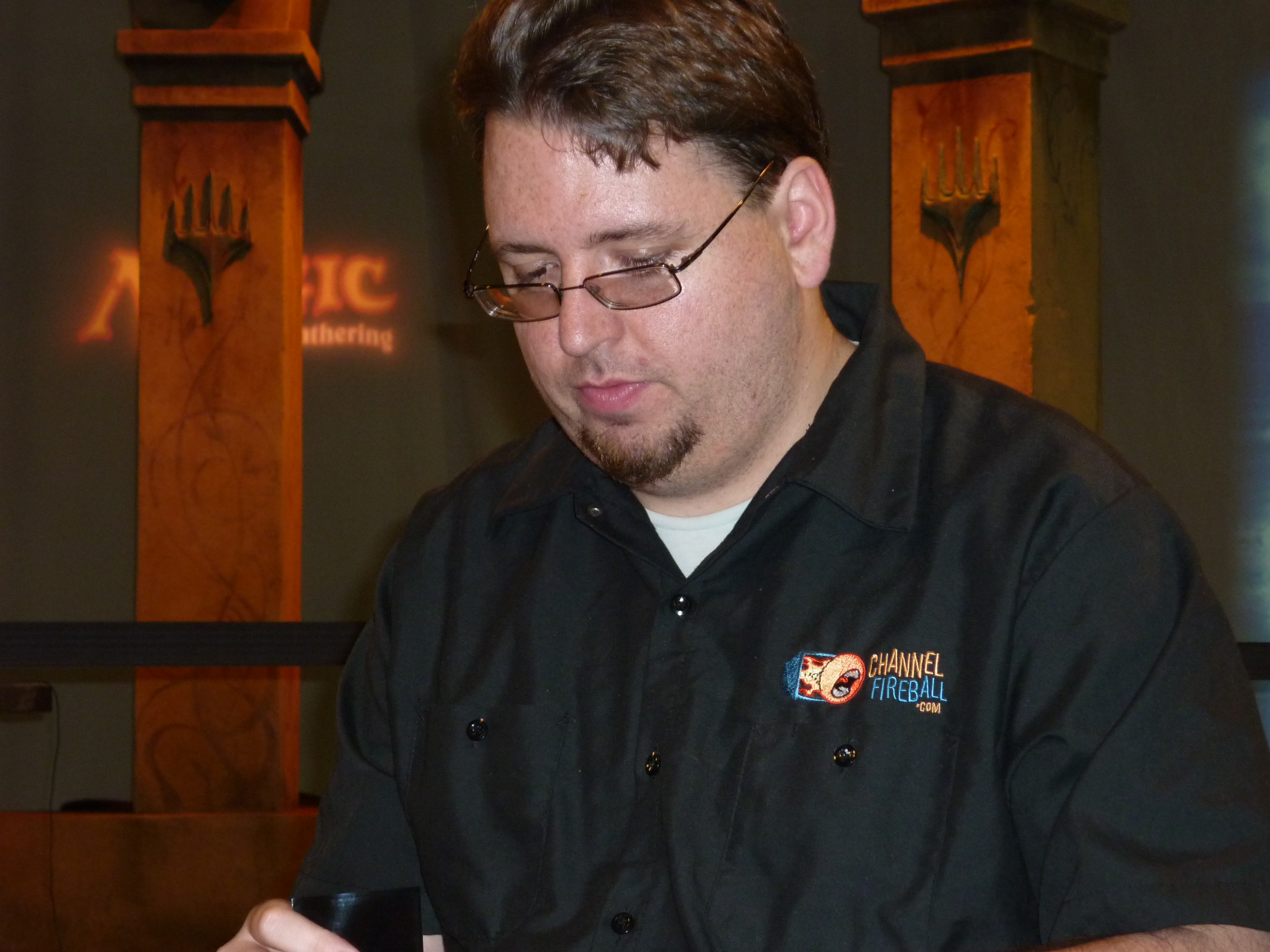
- Scott-Vargas at Pro Tour San Diego 2010
- Nickname: LSV
- Born: February 17, 1983 (age 43); Oakland, California, U.S.
- Nationality: United States
- Pro Tour debut: 2004 Pro Tour San Diego
- Winnings: $337,980
- Pro Tour wins (Top 8): 1 (10)
- Grand Prix wins (Top 8): 5 (15)
- Lifetime Pro Points: 508
- Planeswalker Level: 50 (Archmage)

Luis Scott-Vargas (born February 17, 1983), commonly known as LSV, is a professional Magic: the Gathering player from Oakland, California, USA, currently living in Denver, Colorado. His accomplishments include fifteen Grand Prix Top 8s (five wins among them) and ten Pro Tour Top 8s (one win among them). In 2013 he was inducted into the Magic: The Gathering Hall of Fame. As well as being a prominent player, LSV is also known for his writing about the game. He was a writer for StarCityGames.com before becoming the editor and vice president for ChannelFireball.com, a Magic: The Gathering shop and strategy website. LSV still writes for ChannelFireball but ended his tenure as editor in 2012 to work as a game designer at Dire Wolf Digital, specifically on Eternal, and in 2021 LSV joined Good Luck Games to work on Storybook Brawl.

== Magic: The Gathering career ==
LSV first qualified for the Pro Tour in 2004 for Pro Tour San Diego and has been an active competitor in major Magic: the Gathering events since.

LSV's breakout performance came at the 2006 US Nationals, where he won a play-off to take third place and earn a place on the US Nationals team with Paul Cheon and Benjamin Lundquist. The US Nationals team finished 13th in the team competition at the 2006 World Championship.

He went on to win US Nationals in 2007, leading a US Nationals team featuring Thomas Drake and Michael Bennett. The US National team finished in 25th place at the 2007 World Championship. He also won Grand Prix San Francisco that season, his first Grand Prix title.

The 2008 season brought even greater success for LSV. He made the Top 8 of Grand Prix Philadelphia before going on to make his first Pro Tour Top 8 at Pro Tour Berlin. LSV reached the finals of the Pro Tour where he defeated Matej Zatlkaj to win his first, and so far only, Pro Tour title. He continued his success by winning his second Grand Prix event at Grand Prix Atlanta. By the end of the year, LSV had amassed 58 Pro points, placing him in joint second place in the Player of the Year standings alongside Olivier Ruel.

The 2009 season featured another strong set of results for LSV. He started the season by winning his third Grand Prix in as many years at Grand Prix Los Angeles. He then made his second career Pro Tour Top 8 at Pro Tour Kyoto. Once again, he reached the finals, but this time lost to Gabriel Nassif. He rounded out his year with another Grand Prix Top 8 at Grand Prix Seattle. He finished in seventh place for the 2009 Player of the Year standings with 52 Pro Points.

The 2010 season was the first time since 2006 that LSV did not win a major event. However, he did make a Grand Prix and a Pro Tour Top 8 at Grand Prix Sydney and Pro Tour San Diego. LSV currently holds the record for the longest undefeated run at a Pro Tour after going 16-0 at Pro Tour San Diego, before losing in the semifinals to eventual winner Simon Görtzen. For the second consecutive year, LSV placed seventh in the Player of the Year standings at the end of the season.

The 2011 season was a very successful one for LSV. He won Grand Prix Kansas City and advanced to the Top 8 of US Nationals, Pro Tour Nagoya and the 2011 World Championship. This was the first time that LSV made the Top 8 two Pro Tour events in a single season, and the first time he made Top 8 of a World Championship. LSV only needed to win his quarterfinal match against Richard Bland at the World Championship to overtake Owen Turtenwald and win the Player of the Year title. He lost 2-3 to Bland, leading to Owen Turtenwald winning the Player of the Year title and LSV taking second place. Also in 2011, LSV was invited to take part in the third annual Magic Online Community Cup. The Community Cup is a special event held by Wizards of the Coast in which prominent members of the Magic Online community are invited to the Wizards of the Coast offices to play in a tournament against staff. LSV was picked for the Community Cup for his contribution to the community through draft videos and his articles and work for ChannelFireball.com. Ultimately, it was the Community Team that won the tournament defeating the Wizards Team and winning the Community Cup as well as a prize for the Magic Online community.

From 2009–11, LSV was one of the most consistent players on the Pro Tour, with the highest median and average finish at Pro Tour events amongst high-ranked players.

In the 2012 season, LSV made the Top 8 of Grand Prix Lincoln. His overall performance for the season also qualified him for the inaugural Magic Players Championship. LSV won a 2012 World Magic Cup Qualifier to earn a place on the United States national team, alongside national champion Brian Kibler, for the first World Magic Cup event.

LSV first became eligible for the Magic Pro Tour Hall of Fame in 2013. LSV lead the 2013 ballot, receiving 95.63% of the vote, and thus was the first inductee in the Class of 2013. LSV was inducted into the Hall of Fame at Pro Tour Theros alongside Ben Stark and William Jensen.

After his 2011 Worlds top 8 finish LSV experienced a drought of high-caliber Pro Tour finishes although he made it to the top 8 of several Grand Prix in that period. Eventually LSV managed another Top 8 at Pro Tour Oath of the Gatewatch in 2016 alongside two of his ChannelFireball teammates. In what was LSV's sixth Pro Tour Top 8 he lost to eventual champion Jiachen Tao in the semi-finals, ultimately finishing in third place. LSV followed this up with a top 8 at the next Pro Tour for Shadows Over Innistrad, piloting a BG Aristocrats deck for the standard portion of the event. He lost his quarter final match 3-1 to Shouta Yasooka. The next Pro Tour, for Eldritch Moon, led to LSV's third Pro Tour top 8 in a row, a feat accomplished only twice before (by Scott Johns and Jon Finkel) and not for nearly 18 years.

Despite LSV's great success in the 2015-16 season, he decided to move to primarily doing coverage for the following season instead of playing. However, Wizards of the Coast has allowed him to defer the platinum status he had earned, and he has stated he intends to play on the Pro Tour again at some point in the future.

=== Play style ===
LSV is known to favor control decks in Limited, and often comments on his love for drawn out games involving mana-intensive cards. In Constructed, Scott-Vargas has a preference for Combo and Control decks, but has been successful with a variety of different archetypes. When he won Pro Tour Berlin, he piloted an Elf typal combo deck; he achieved his two Constructed Grand Prix wins with a blue-black control deck and a Storm combo deck; and his three most recent Pro Tour top eight finishes were all with aggressive decks, including a Naya (red-green-white) deck with which he went undefeated in the Swiss rounds of Pro Tour San Diego 2010, and an Eldrazi aggro deck in 2016.

=== Achievements ===
Season	Event type	Location	Format	Date	Rank
2006	Nationals	Atlanta	Special	July 28–30, 2006	3
2007	Nationals	Baltimore	Special	July 26–29, 2007	1
2007	Grand Prix	San Francisco	Block Constructed	August 25–26, 2007	1
2008	Grand Prix	Philadelphia	Extended	March 15–16, 2008	3
2008	Pro Tour	Berlin	Extended	October 31–November 2, 2008	1
2008	Grand Prix	Atlanta	Limited	November 15–16, 2008	1
2009	Grand Prix	Los Angeles	Extended	January 17–18, 2009	1
2009	Pro Tour	Kyoto	Standard and Booster Draft	February 27–March 1, 2009	2
2009	Grand Prix	Seattle/Tacoma	Standard	May 30–31, 2009	5
2010	Pro Tour	San Diego	Standard and Booster Draft	February 19–21, 2010	3
2010	Grand Prix	Sydney	Sealed and Booster Draft	October 9–10, 2010	2
2011	Pro Tour	Nagoya	Block Constructed and Booster Draft	June 10–12, 2011	7
2011	Grand Prix	Kansas City, Missouri	Sealed and Booster Draft	June 18–19, 2011	1
2011	Nationals	Indianapolis	Standard and Booster Draft	August 5–7, 2011	5
2011	Worlds	San Francisco	Special	November 17–20, 2011	6
2012	Grand Prix	Lincoln, Nebraska	Modern	February 18–19, 2012	3
2012–13	Grand Prix	Philadelphia	Sealed and Booster Draft	October 27–28, 2012	7
2012–13	Grand Prix	Indianapolis	Sealed and Booster Draft	December 22–23, 2012	3
2013–14	Grand Prix	Richmond	Modern	March 8–9, 2014	8
2014–15	Grand Prix	Portland	Team Limited	August 9–10, 2014	4
2014–15	Grand Prix	San Jose	Team Limited	January 31–February 1, 2015	1
2014–15	Grand Prix	Atlantic City	Sealed and Booster Draft	May 9–10, 2015	6
2015–16	Grand Prix	Detroit	Team Limited	August 15–16, 2015	2
2015–16	Pro Tour	Atlanta	Modern and Booster Draft	February 5–7, 2016	3
2015–16	Pro Tour	Madrid	Standard and Booster Draft	April 22–24, 2016	7
2015–16	Pro Tour	Sydney	Standard and Booster Draft	August 5–7, 2016	4
2018–19	Pro Tour	Atlanta	Standard and Booster Draft	November 9–11, 2018	2
2018–19	Pro Tour	Cleveland	Standard and Booster Draft	February 22–24, 2019	4
2018–19	Grand Prix	Denver	Standard	July 20–21, 2019	1

Last updated: August 7, 2016
Source: Event Coverage at Wizards.com

=== Team ChannelFireball ===
Team ChannelFireball is a team of professional Magic: The Gathering players, formed in 2010. The team is named after two Magic: the Gathering cards – Channel and Fireball, one of the most famous two-card combos from the early days of the game. Many of the members of the team write strategy articles for an eponymous website. LSV is considered to be the official leader of the team, as he is often responsible for organising the team meeting and practicing for events.

Current and former Team Members

- (United States) Luis Scott-Vargas
- (Brazil) Paulo Vitor Damo da Rosa
- (United States) David Ochoa
- (United States) Josh Utter-Leyton
- (United States) Owen Turtenwald
- (United States) Conley Woods
- (United States) Ben Stark
- (United States) Brian Kibler
- (United States) Brad Nelson
- (United States) Matt Nass
- (United States) Tom Martell
- (United States) Eric Froehlich
- (Japan) Shuhei Nakamura
- (Czech Republic) Martin Juza
- (Czech Republic) Lukas Blohon
- (United States) Reid Duke
- (United States) Gerry Thompson
- (Israel) (United States) Shahar Shenhar
- (Netherlands) Frank Karsten
- (Japan) Kenji Tsumura
- (United States) Pat Cox
- (United States) Ben Lundquist
- (United States) Brock Parker
- (United States) Paul Rietzl
- (United States) Paul Cheon
- (United States) David Williams
- (Slovakia) Ivan Floch
- (United States) Mike Sigrist

Pro Tour Achievements

Team ChannelFireball has had considerable success on the Pro Tour, putting at least one player in the Top 8 of every Pro Tour from Pro Tour San Diego 2010 to Pro Tour Dragon's Maze 2013, with the exception of Pro Tour Avacyn Restored. Eight of the sixteen players participating in the inaugural 2012 Magic Players Championship were members of Team ChannelFireball. Three members of Team ChannelFireball have won Player of the Year titles since the creation of the team: Brad Nelson (2010), though he left the team prior to winning the title; Owen Turtenwald (2011); and Josh Utter-Leyton (2013).

Year	Pro Tour	Members in Top 8 (players in bold won)
2010	San Diego	Luis Scott-Vargas
2010	San Juan	**Paulo Vitor Damo da Rosa**, Josh Utter-Leyton, Brad Nelson
2010	Amsterdam	Brad Nelson, Brian Kibler
2010	Worlds	Paulo Vitor Damo da Rosa, Eric Froehlich
2011	Paris	**Ben Stark**
2011	Nagoya	Luis Scott-Vargas
2011	Philadelphia	Josh Utter-Leyton
2011	Worlds	Conley Woods, Paulo Vitor Damo da Rosa, Luis Scott-Vargas, Josh Utter-Leyton
2012	Dark Ascension	**Brian Kibler**, Paulo Vitor Damo da Rosa, Lukas Blohon
2012–13	Return to Ravnica	David Ochoa
2012–13	Gatecrash	Ben Stark, Gerry Thompson, Eric Froehlich
2012–13	Dragon's Maze	Josh Utter-Leyton
2013–14	Journey into Nyx	Josh Utter-Leyton
2013–14	Magic 2015	Patrick Cox
2014–15	Fate Reforged	Eric Froehlich
2014–15	Oath of the Gatewatch	Ivan Floch, Luis Scott-Vargas, Shuhei Nakamura
2018–19	Guilds of Ravnica	

=== Other Magic-related work ===
From 2006 to 2009, LSV wrote strategy articles for StarCityGames.com and AdventuresOn.com (now BlackBorder.com). In early 2009, he left both to help launch ChannelFireball.com. Among his work for the site, he's been known for his draft videos and set reviews as well as the Magic TV show. Since 2013, LSV has also been doing commentary at Pro Tours, in addition to the occasional Grand Prix. In 2015, LSV joined Marshall Sutcliffe as a cohost of the Limited Resources podcast, a popular podcast that focuses on the Sealed and Draft aspects of Magic.

== Personal life ==
LSV was born in Oakland, California to his parents Claudio and Penny. He has two brothers, Antonio and Miguel. He graduated from UC Davis in 2005.

In May 2012, LSV announced that he would be moving to Denver, having acquired a job as a game designer there.

On June 29, 2016, LSV and his then wife Geneva Sarcedo's first child was born. They named her Naya Scott Vargas Sarcedo, after the Magic nickname for the color combination of red, green, and white.

On October 11, 2021, Gaby Spartz gave birth to their son and LSV's second child, Santi. In November, 2024, Spartz and Vargas had twins named Leo and Sofia.

Preceded by Paul Cheon	Magic US National Champion; 2007	Succeeded by Michael Jacob
