= Magic: The Gathering Pro Tour season 2013–14 =

2013–14 Pro Tour season
- Pro Player of the Year: (France) Jérémy Dezani
- Rookie of the Year: (United States) Raymond Perez Jr.
- World Champion: (Israel) Shahar Shenhar
- Pro Tours: 4
- Grands Prix: 57
- Hall of Fame inductions: (United States) Luis Scott-Vargas (United States) William Jensen (United States) Ben Stark
- Start of season: 25 May 2013
- End of season: 3 August 2014

The 2013–14 Pro Tour season was the nineteenth season of the Magic: The Gathering Pro Tour. It started on 25 May with Grand Prix Guadalajara and ended on 3 August 2014 with the conclusion of Pro Tour Magic 2015 in Portland. The season consisted of 57 Grand Prix and four Pro Tours, located in Dublin, Valencia, Atlanta, and Portland.

== Grand Prix ==
GP Guadalajara (25–26 May 2013)

- Format: Standard
- Attendance: 462
1. (Mexico) Andrés Martínez
2. (Brazil) Willy Edel
3. (Japan) Ken Yukuhiro
4. (Mexico) Juan Carlos Castillo Mata
5. (Mexico) Mervyn Cesar Gonzalez Delgado
6. (Mexico) Emmanuel Ramírez Sánchez
7. (Mexico) Manuel Monge Hernández
8. (Mexico) Emiliano Sanchez Gonzalez

GP Providence (8–9 June 2013)

- Format: Team Limited
- Attendance: 1758 (586 teams)

1.

(United States) Andrew Longo
(United States) Eric Phillipps
(United States) Eric Berger

2.

(United States) Matt McCullough
(United States) Ari Lax
(United States) Alexander John

3.

(United States) Bruce Cowley
(United States) Chris Manning
(United States) Kevin Bohlmann

4.

(Czech Republic) Martin Jůza
(Japan) Shuhei Nakamura
(United States) Ben Stark

GP Gothenburg (8–9 June 2013)

- Format: Limited
- Attendance: 1006
1. (Denmark) Oscar Christensen
2. (Sweden) Mats Törnros
3. (Germany) Robin Steinborn
4. (Germany) Thoralf Severin
5. (Netherlands) Jan van der Vegt
6. (Belgium) Mark Dictus
7. (Finland) Antti Varhimo
8. (Poland) Michal Gajewski

GP Houston (15–16 June 2013)

- Format: Limited
- Attendance: 999
1. (Israel) Shahar Shenhar
2. (United States) Tom Ross
3. (United States) Phu Dao
4. (United States) Marc Lalague
5. (Canada) Mani Davoudi
6. (United States) David Bruno
7. (Japan) Shuuhei Nakamura
8. (United States) Darin Minard

GP Miami (29–30 June 2013)

- Format: Standard
- Attendance: 1258
1. (United States) Reid Duke
2. (United States) Josh McClain
3. (United States) Brad Nelson
4. (Austria) Valentin Mackl
5. (Canada) Samuel Tharmaratnam
6. (United States) Peter Ingram
7. (Denmark) Christoffer Larsen
8. (United States) Matthew Costa

GP Rimini (27–28 July 2013)

- Format: Limited
- Attendance: 1034
1. (Austria) Chistoph Aukenthaler
2. (Sweden) Rasmus Björklund
3. (Italy) Emanuele Giusti
4. (Italy) Federico Del Basso
5. (United States) Ben Stark
6. (Hungary) Tamás Nagy
7. (Croatia) Stjepan Sučić
8. (France) Pierre Sommen

GP Las Vegas (22–23 June 2013)

- Format: Limited
- Attendance: 4500
1. (United States) Neal Oliver
2. (United States) Madison Jonas
3. (United States) Lance Hartbarger
4. (United States) Dustin Ochoa
5. (United States) Sean Collins
6. (United States) Jeff Psyhos
7. (United States) Steve Cahill
8. (United States) Justin Nguyen

GP Kansas City (6–7 July 2013)

- Format: Modern
- Attendance: 958
1. (United States) Seth Manfield
2. (United States) Joe Hemmann
3. (United States) Robert Berni
4. (United States) Scott Hoppe
5. (United States) Brandon Nelson
6. (United States) Ari Lax
7. (United States) Casey Swanson
8. (United States) Greg Ogreenc

GP Bangkok (22–23 June 2013)

- Format: Limited
- Attendance: 864
1. (Indonesia) Patriawan Kurniadi
2. (Singapore) Nicholas Wong
3. (Taiwan) Yu Chung Huang
4. (Japan) Yuuya Watanabe
5. (Thailand) Boonyarit Triphonratana
6. (Thailand) Chanaphol Kamolto
7. (Malaysia) Raymond Tan
8. (France) Beaumer Michael

GP Calgary (27–28 July 2013)

- Format: Standard
- Attendance: 630
1. (Canada) Alexander Hayne
2. (Canada) Stephane Gerard
3. (Canada) Brady Boychuk
4. (Canada) Ryan Zawalsky
5. (United States) Jacob Wilson
6. (Canada) Adam Laforest
7. (United States) Gavin Bennett
8. (Canada) Trent Douglas

== Magic: The Gathering World Championship ==
Amsterdam (31 July–4 August 2013)

- Prize pool: $108,000
- Format: Modern Masters Booster Draft, Standard, Magic 2014 Booster Draft, Modern
- Attendance: 16

=== Top 4 playoff ===
Semifinals
Reid Duke	3
Josh Utter-Leyton	2
Ben Stark	1
Shahar Shenhar	3

Finals
Reid Duke	2
Shahar Shenhar	3

=== Final standings ===
The following sixteen players received an invitation to the 2013 World Championship due to their performance in the 2012–13 season. They are ordered according to the final standings of the event.

#	Player	Prize	Pro points	Qualified due to
1	(Israel) Shahar Shenhar	$40,000	12	5th most Pro Points of otherwise unqualified
2	(United States) Reid Duke	$20,000	11	8th most Pro Points of otherwise unqualified
3	(United States) Ben Stark	$10,000	8	2nd most Pro Points of otherwise unqualified
4	(United States) Josh Utter-Leyton	$10,000	7	2012–13 Player of the Year
5	(United States) Craig Wescoe	$5,000	7	Pro Tour Dragon's Maze winner
6	(Japan) Yuuya Watanabe	$5,000	7	2012 Players Championship winner
7	(United States) Brian Kibler	$5,000	6	4th most Pro Points of otherwise unqualified
8	(Japan) Shuhei Nakamura	$5,000	6	3rd most Pro Points of otherwise unqualified
9	(Russia) Dimitriy Butakov	$1,000	6	2012 Magic Online Champion
10	(United States) David Ochoa	$1,000	6	7th most Pro Points of otherwise unqualified
11	(Czech Republic) Stanislav Cifka	$1,000	5	Pro Tour Return to Ravnica winner
12	(United States) Tom Martell	$1,000	5	Pro Tour Gatecrash winner
13	(Brazil) Willy Edel	$1,000	5	Pro Point leader Latin America
14	(United States) Eric Froehlich	$1,000	4	Most Pro Points of otherwise unqualified
15	(Hong Kong) Lee Shi Tian	$1,000	3	Pro Point leader APAC region
16	(Czech Republic) Martin Jůza	$1,000	2	6th most Pro Points of otherwise unqualified

== World Magic Cup ==
Amsterdam (2–4 August 2013)

- Prize pool: $250,000
- Format: Team Constructed, Team Limited

=== Top 8 ===
Quarter-finals
1	Austria	1
8	Hungary	2
4	Czech Republic	2
5	New Zealand	0
2	France	2
7	Belgium	0
3	Estonia	0
6	Iceland	2

Semi-finals
Hungary	2
Czech Republic	1
France	2
Iceland	0

Finals
Hungary	1
France	2

=== Final standings ===
Place	Country	Player	Prize	Pro Points
1	France	Raphaël Lévy	$12,000	8
1	France	Timothée Simonot	$12,000	8
1	France	Yann Guthmann	$12,000	8
1	France	Stephane Soubrier	$12,000	8
2	Hungary	Tamas Nagy	$6,500	7
2	Hungary	Gabor Kocsis	$6,500	7
2	Hungary	Ervin Hosszú	$6,500	7
2	Hungary	Adorjan Korbl	$6,500	7
3	Czech Republic	Stanislav Cifka	$4,000	6
3	Czech Republic	Leos Kopecky	$4,000	6
3	Czech Republic	Kristian Janda	$4,000	6
3	Czech Republic	Michal Mendl	$4,000	6
4	Iceland	Alvin Orri Gislason	$4,000	6
4	Iceland	Ragnar Sigurdsson	$4,000	6
4	Iceland	Hedinn Haraldsson	$4,000	6
4	Iceland	Orri Ómarsson	$4,000	6

Place	Country	Player	Prize	Pro Points
5	Austria	Thomas Holzinger	$2,000	5
5	Austria	David Reitbauer	$2,000	5
5	Austria	Manuel Danninger	$2,000	5
5	Austria	Marc Mühlböck	$2,000	5
6	Estonia	Hannes Kerem	$2,000	5
6	Estonia	Rauno Raidma	$2,000	5
6	Estonia	Simon Robberts	$2,000	5
6	Estonia	Mikk Kaasik	$2,000	5
7	New Zealand	Walker MacMurdo	$2,000	5
7	New Zealand	Jingwei Zheng	$2,000	5
7	New Zealand	Digby Carter	$2,000	5
7	New Zealand	Jason Chung	$2,000	5
8	Belgium	Vincent Lemoine	$2,000	5
8	Belgium	Emmanuel Delvigne	$2,000	5
8	Belgium	Marijn Lybaert	$2,000	5
8	Belgium	Xavier Vantyghem	$2,000	5

== Grand Prix ==
GP Warsaw (10–11 August 2013)

- Format: Standard
- Attendance: 984
1. (Germany) Wenzel Krautmann
2. (Chile) Felipe Tapia Becerra
3. (France) Jérémy Dezani
4. (Poland) Michal Kolacinski
5. (Sweden) Niklas Ramquist
6. (France) Yann Robin
7. (Sweden) Denniz Rachid
8. (Poland) Przemek Oberbek

GP Prague (31 August–1 September 2013)

- Format: Limited
- Attendance: 1508
1. (Russia) Anatoly Chuhwichov
2. (Italy) Marco Cammilluzzi
3. (Hungary) Balazs Varady
4. (Germany) Kai Mokrusch
5. (Czech Republic) Martin Jůza
6. (Israel) Amit Cohen
7. (France) Eliot Boussaudi
8. (France) Raphaël Lévy

GP Brisbane (5–6 October 2013)

- Format: Modern
- Attendance: 467
1. (Australia) Justin Robb
2. (Australia) Daniel Unwin
3. (Australia) Justin Cheung
4. (Australia) Ben Tudman
5. (Australia) Garry Wong
6. (Australia) Wilfy Horig
7. (Australia) Cameron Harris
8. (Singapore) Wee Yuen Khor

GP Kitakyushu (24–25 August 2013)

- Format: Standard
- Attendance: 1184
1. (Malaysia) Raymond Tan
2. (Japan) Kouichi Kudou
3. (Taiwan) Kuo Tzu-Ching
4. (Japan) Ryosuke Nomura
5. (Japan) Kentaro Yamamoto
6. (Japan) Yuuta Takahashi
7. (Japan) Takashi Naitou
8. (Japan) Hiroaki Taniguchi

GP Detroit (14–15 September 2013)

- Format: Modern
- Attendance: 1461
1. (United States) Josh McClain
2. (United States) Reid Duke
3. (Canada) Ben Moir
4. (United States) Ben Stark
5. (United States) Adam Jansen
6. (United States) Alex Majlaton
7. (Mexico) Marcelino Freeman
8. (Brazil) Willy Edel

GP Oakland (24–25 August 2013)

- Format: Limited
- Attendance: 1631
1. (United States) William Jensen
2. (United States) Neal Oliver
3. (United States) Ben Lundquist
4. (United States) Joshua Goldman
5. (United States) Carlos Ale
6. (United States) Travis Woo
7. (United States) Elliott Woo
8. (United States) Patrick Griffin

GP Oklahoma City (5–6 October 2013)

- Format: Limited
- Attendance: 1081
1. (United States) Pierre-Christophe Mondon
2. (United States) John Penick
3. (United States) Ty Thomason
4. (United States) Tyler Brandstetter
5. (United States) William Lowry
6. (United States) Zach Dorsett
7. (United States) Rick Stout
8. (United States) James Fulgium

== Pro Tour Theros ==
At the start of Pro Tour Theros Luis Scott-Vargas, William Jensen, and Ben Stark were inducted into the Hall of Fame. Day one ended with Samuel Black and Paul Rietzl having won all their eight matches. Thirteen players followed at seven wins, including well-known players such as Jon Finkel and Makihito Mihara. After round 15 of the tournament the standings shaped up in a way that guaranteed the best four player to qualify for the top eight, and allowed the players in fifth to eighth place to guarantee qualification for the top eight by drawing intentionally. Consequently, the eight players that were at the top of the standings after round 15 were also at the top after round 16, and thus qualified for the top eight. They were Jérémy Dezani, Guillaume Wafo-Tapa, and Pierre Dagen of France, Samuel Black and Paul Rietzl from the United States, Makihito Mihara and Kentarou Yamamoto from Japan, and Kamiel Cornelissen from the Netherlands. In the top eight the French players then only lost to each other. Wafo-Tapa was eliminated by Dagen in the quarter-finals, and in the finals Dezani defeated Dagen to win Pro Tour Theros.

Dublin (11–13 October 2013)

- Prize pool: $250,000
- Format: Standard, Booster Draft (Theros-Theros-Theros)
- Attendance: 428

=== Top 8 ===
Quarter-finals
1	Jérémy Dezani	3
8	Kamiel Cornelissen	0
4	Makihito Mihara	3
5	Paul Rietzl	2
2	Samuel Black	3
7	Kentarou Yamamoto	1
3	Guillaume Wafo-Tapa	1
6	Pierre Dagen	3

Semi-finals
Jérémy Dezani	3
Makihito Mihara	0
Samuel Black	2
Pierre Dagen	3

Finals
Jérémy Dezani	3
Pierre Dagen	1

=== Final standings ===
Place	Player	Prize	Pro Points	Comment
1	(France) Jérémy Dezani	$40,000	30	
2	(France) Pierre Dagen	$20,000	24	
3	(United States) Samuel Black	$12,500	22	2nd final day
4	(Japan) Makihito Mihara	$12,500	22	5th final day
5	(France) Guillaume Wafo-Tapa	$10,000	20	5th final day
6	(United States) Paul Rietzl	$10,000	20	4th final day
7	(Japan) Kentarou Yamamoto	$10,000	20	2nd final day
8	(Netherlands) Kamiel Cornelissen	$10,000	20	6th final day

== Grand Prix ==
GP Louisville (19–20 October 2013)

- Format: Standard
- Attendance: 1048
1. (United States) Brian Braun-Duin
2. (Canada) Jon Stern
3. (United States) Andrew Baeckstrom
4. (United States) Alex Sittner
5. (United States) Sam Black
6. (United States) Brad Nelson
7. (United States) Todd Anderson
8. (United States) William Jensen

GP Santiago (2–3 November 2013)

- Format: Standard
- Attendance: 734
1. (Chile) Luis Navas
2. (Argentina) Matias Soler
3. (Chile) Cristian Di Silvestre Vidal
4. (Argentina) Nicolas De Nicola
5. (Argentina) Luis Salvatto
6. (Brazil) Carlos Davi Montenegro
7. (Brazil) Jonathan Melamed
8. (Brazil) Vilmar Barbosa Destini

GP Albuquerque (22–23 November 2013)

- Format: Standard
- Attendance: 862
1. (United States) Owen Turtenwald
2. (United States) Sam Pardee
3. (United States) Todd Anderson
4. (Austria) Valentin Mackl
5. (United States) Samuel Black
6. (United States) Joseph Nix
7. (United States) Andrew Hanson
8. (United States) Paul Rietzl

GP Hong Kong (19–20 October 2013)

- Format: Limited
- Attendance: 989
1. (Japan) Shuuhei Nakamura
2. (Czech Republic) Martin Jůza
3. (Japan) Ken Yukuhiro
4. (Japan) Yuuta Takahashi
5. (China) Xiaoshi Lu
6. (China) Lei Yu Sheng
7. (Singapore) Denny Dunsford
8. (Singapore) Soon Lye Ng

GP Valencia (9–10 November 2013)

- Format: Limited
- Attendance: 1076
1. (Switzerland) Samuel Marti
2. (Ukraine) Andrii Gusiev
3. (Spain) Eddie Chalecki Cuenca
4. (Austria) Valentin Mackl
5. (Latvia) Aleksejs Laizans
6. (Russia) Dmitriy Butakov
7. (Italy) Piero Lombardi
8. (Spain) Roberto Maestro

GP Kyoto (22–23 November 2013)

- Format: Team Limited
- Attendance: 1734 (578 teams)

1.

(United States) Mike Hron
(Canada) Alexander Hayne
(Canada) Richard Hoaen

2.

(Japan) Makihito Mihara
(Japan) Jun'ichirou Bandou
(Japan) Kentarou Yamamoto

3.

(Japan) Toshinori Shigehara
(Japan) Takayuki Kadono
(Japan) Hiroki Furukawa

4.

(Japan) Shouta Yasooka
(Japan) Tomoharu Saitou
(Japan) Katsuhiro Mori

GP Antwerp (26–27 October 2013)

- Format: Modern
- Attendance: 1601
1. (Germany) Patrick Dickmann
2. (Venezuela) Fabrizio Anteri
3. (Russia) Nazar Sotiriadi
4. (Sweden) Rasmus Björklund
5. (Italy) Daniel Fior
6. (Netherlands) Thomas Hendriks
7. (Iceland) Hermann Rúnarsson
8. (France) Alexandre Bonneau

GP Washington, D.C. (16–17 November 2013)

- Format: Legacy
- Attendance: 1698
1. (United States) Owen Turtenwald
2. (United States) Jared Boettcher
3. (United States) Drew Tunison
4. (United States) Samuel Black
5. (United States) Craig Wescoe
6. (United States) Andrew Cuneo
7. (Canada) Ted McCluskie
8. (United States) Deshaun Baylock

GP Toronto (30 November–1 December 2013)

- Format: Limited
- Attendance: 1603
1. (United States) Ari Lax
2. (United States) Greg Ogreenc
3. (United States) William Jensen
4. (Canada) Richard Kraupa
5. (United States) Seth Manfield
6. (Canada) Ben Moir
7. (Canada) Robert Smith
8. (Canada) Edgar Magalhaes

GP Vienna (30 November–1 December 2013)

- Format: Standard
- Attendance: 1465
1. (Poland) Marcin Staciwa
2. (Slovenia) Robin Dolar
3. (Austria) Niklas Kaltenböck
4. (France) Jérémy Dezani
5. (Czech Republic) Stanislav Cifka
6. (Italy) Manuel Cecilia
7. (Sweden) Johan Prinzell
8. (Austria) Oliver Polak-Rottmann

GP Prague (11–12 January 2014)

- Format: Modern
- Attendance: 1401
1. (Croatia) Vjeran Horvat
2. (Germany) Marcel Kachapow
3. (Spain) Carlos Moral
4. (Italy) Emanuele Giusti
5. (Austria) Bernhard Wurmitzer
6. (Slovenia) Andrej Rutar
7. (France) Jérémy Dezani
8. (Slovenia) Robin Dolar

GP Kuala Lumpur (25–26 January 2014)

- Format: Limited
- Attendance: 1007
1. (Singapore) Fabien Li
2. (Taiwan) Ryan Young Hao-Wei
3. (South Korea) Park Jun Young
4. (Malaysia) Shamsul Bahrin Zainuddin
5. (Thailand) Krissapas Kuptimitr
6. (Japan) Shouta Yasooka
7. (Malaysia) Jack Teo
8. (Malaysia) Mohd Khairul Anuar Abdul Aziz

GP Dallas (7–8 December 2013)

- Format: Standard
- Attendance: 834
1. (Mexico) Marlon Gutierrez
2. (United States) William Jensen
3. (Mexico) Carlos Reyes
4. (United States) Ben Stark
5. (United States) Haibing Hu
6. (United States) Eric Centauri
7. (United States) Seth Manfield
8. (United States) Darin Minard

GP Sacramento (18–19 January 2014)

- Format: Limited
- Attendance: 1859
1. (United States) Tom Martell
2. (United States) Philip Yam
3. (United States) Eric Pei
4. (United States) Aaron Lewis
5. (United States) Adam Mancuso
6. (United States) Nathannael Maliszewski
7. (United States) Ryan Miller
8. (United States) Andy Voellmer

GP Paris (15–16 February 2014)

- Format: Legacy
- Attendance: 1587
1. (Spain) Javier Dominguez
2. (France) Maxime Gilles
3. (France) Loïc Le Briand
4. (Austria) Philipp Schönegger
5. (France) Jean-Mary Accart
6. (Spain) Jóse Manuel Fernández Castelló
7. (Germany) Stefan Böttcher
8. (Brazil) Paulo Vitor Damo da Rosa

GP Shizuoka (21–22 December 2013)

- Format: Standard
- Attendance: 1784
1. (Japan) Ryo Nakada
2. (Japan) Shota Takao
3. (Japan) Hajime Nakashima
4. (Japan) Shouta Yasooka
5. (Japan) Kazuaki Fujimura
6. (Japan) Keisuke Sato
7. (Japan) Tadaki Tsukagoshi
8. (Japan) Junya Iyanaga

GP Vancouver (25–26 January 2014)

- Format: Standard
- Attendance: 1042
1. (Canada) Alexander Hayne
2. (United States) Peter Sundholm
3. (Canada) Robert Gillespie
4. (Canada) Jon Stern
5. (United States) Matthew Sperling
6. (United States) Adam Ruprecht
7. (United States) Eugene Hwang
8. (Canada) Mike Vasovski

GP Mexico City (15–16 February 2014)

- Format: Limited
- Attendance: 704
1. (United States) Marc Lalague
2. (Mexico) Marcelino Freeman
3. (Mexico) Hugo Daniel Araiza
4. (Mexico) Ignaci Ibarra Del Rio
5. (Mexico) Mario Flores
6. (Mexico) Emiliano Sanchez
7. (Mexico) Miguel Rodriguez
8. (United States) Derek Woloshyn

== Pro Tour Born of the Gods ==
Valencia (21–23 February 2014)

- Prize pool: $250,000
- Format: Modern, Booster Draft (Born of the Gods-Theros-Theros)
- Attendance: 393

=== Top 8 ===
Quarter-finals
1	Shaun McLaren	2
8	Tim Rivera	1
4	Christian Seibold	1
5	Patrick Dickmann	2
2	Shi Tian Lee	0
7	Anssi Alkio	2
3	Jacob Wilson	2
6	Chris Fennell	0

Semi-finals
Shaun McLaren	2
Patrick Dickmann	1
Anssi Alkio	1
Jacob Wilson	2

Finals
Shaun McLaren	3
Jacob Wilson	2

=== Final standings ===
Place	Player	Prize	Pro Points	Comment
1	(Canada) Shaun McLaren	$40,000	30	
2	(Canada) Jacob Wilson	$20,000	24	
3	(Germany) Patrick Dickmann	$12,500	22	
4	(Finland) Anssi Alkio	$12,500	22	
5	(Hong Kong) Lee Shi Tian	$10,000	20	2nd final day
6	(Germany) Christian Seibold	$10,000	20	
7	(United States) Chris Fennell	$10,000	20	
8	(United States) Tim Rivera	$10,000	20	

== Grand Prix ==
GP Barcelona (1–2 March 2014)

- Format: Team Limited
- Attendance: 1626 (542 teams)

1.

(Germany) Christian Seibold
(Germany) Tobias Gräfensteiner
(Germany) Daniel Gräfensteiner

2.

(Switzerland) Olivier Duport
(Switzerland) Wilson Lam
(Switzerland) Louis Ballivet

3.

(United States) Owen Turtenwald
(United States) William Jensen
(United States) Reid Duke

4.

(Germany) Manuel Hauck
(Germany) Stephan Schwarz
(Germany) Christian Hauck

GP Melbourne (1–2 March 2014)

- Format: Standard
- Attendance: 902
1. (South Korea) Nam Sung-Wook
2. (Australia) Patty Robertson
3. (Australia) Yifan Wei
4. (Australia) Ash Webster
5. (New Zealand) Joe Zheng Jingwei
6. (Australia) Luke McGlaughlin
7. (Australia) Craig Chapman
8. (Taiwan) Huang Hao-Shan

GP Richmond (8–9 March 2014)

- Format: Modern
- Attendance: 4300
1. (Canada) Brian Liu
2. (United States) Vipin Chackonal
3. (United States) Mike Sigrist
4. (United States) Oscar Jones
5. (United States) Ben Friedman
6. (United States) Jamie Parke
7. (United States) Josh McClain
8. (United States) Luis Scott-Vargas

GP Montreal (15–16 March 2014)

- Format: Limited
- Attendance: 1614
1. (United States) Gerard Fabiano
2. (United States) Dave Shiels
3. (Canada) Daniel Fournier
4. (Canada) Ian Robertson
5. (United States) Judah Alt
6. (United States) Brock Parker
7. (United States) Morgan Chang
8. (United States) Benjamin Gomes

GP Vienna (22–23 March 2014)

- Format: Limited
- Attendance: 1208
1. (Spain) Aniol Alcaraz
2. (France) Jérémy Dezani
3. (Slovakia) Robert Jurkovic
4. (Serbia) Aleksa Telarov
5. (Germany) Andreas Lesch
6. (Denmark) Mads Utzon
7. (Ukraine) Alexey Antonenko
8. (Sweden) Denniz Rachid

GP Philadelphia (12–13 April 2014)

- Format: Limited
- Attendance: 1892
1. (United States) Frank Skarren
2. (United States) Reid Duke
3. (United States) Adam Mancuso
4. (United States) Mark Evaldi
5. (United States) Christian Calcano
6. (United States) William Jensen
7. (United States) Danny Goldstein
8. (United States) Pierre-Chris Mondon

GP Warsaw (10–11 May 2014)

- Format: Limited
- Attendance: 1004
1. (Venezuela) Fabrizio Anteri
2. (Spain) Javier Dominguez
3. (United States) Ben Yu
4. (Austria) Bernhard Lehner
5. (Ukraine) Sergiy Sushalskyy
6. (Slovakia) Ivan Floch
7. (Belgium) Nicolas Vanderhallen
8. (Venezuela) Daniel Fior

GP Buenos Aires (15–16 March 2014)

- Format: Standard
- Attendance: 884
1. (Brazil) Philippe Monlevade
2. (Argentina) Demian Tejo
3. (Brazil) Paulo Vitor Damo da Rosa
4. (Chile) José Echeverría
5. (Argentina) Fernando Pietragallo
6. (Brazil) Mateus Dos Anjos
7. (Chile) Eduardo Castro
8. (Chile) Sebastian Martinez

GP Beijing (29–30 March 2014)

- Format: Standard
- Attendance: 1224
1. (Japan) Yuuya Watanabe
2. (United States) Sherwin Pu
3. (China) Ben Ge
4. (Japan) Ken Sawada
5. (Japan) Shuhei Nakamura
6. (China) Jian Zhong
7. (South Korea) Nam Sung-Wook
8. (Japan) Naoki Shimizu

GP Nagoya (12–13 April 2014)

- Format: Limited
- Attendance: 1786
1. (Japan) Ryousuke Kasuga
2. (Japan) Takashi Boku
3. (Japan) Hisataka Matsui
4. (Japan) Takatoshi Satou
5. (Japan) Ryuuji Itagaki
6. (Japan) Hiroshi Date
7. (Singapore) Chapman Sim
8. (Japan) Yuuya Sugiyama

GP Cincinnati (22–23 March 2014)

- Format: Standard
- Attendance: 1735
1. (United States) Kyle Boggemes
2. (United States) Brad Nelson
3. (United States) Jared Boettcher
4. (United States) Clyde Martin
5. (United States) Jeffrey Pyka
6. (United States) Bradford Grant
7. (United States) Auston Tramper
8. (United States) Jacob Maynard

GP Phoenix (5–6 April 2014)

- Format: Standard
- Attendance: 1463
1. (United States) Robert Berni
2. (United States) Nathan Holiday
3. (United States) Gary Wong
4. (United States) William Levin
5. (United States) Art Macurda
6. (United States) Eric Froehlich
7. (United States) Brandon Bercovich
8. (United States) Daniel Ward

GP Minneapolis (10–11 May 2014)

- Format: Modern
- Attendance: 1690
1. (South Korea) Park Jun Young
2. (Canada) Andrew Huska
3. (Canada) Shaun McLaren
4. (United States) Gregory Orange
5. (United States) Nathan Holiday
6. (United States) Nick Bonham
7. (United States) Taylor Laehn
8. (United States) Brian Braun-Duin

== Pro Tour Journey into Nyx ==
Atlanta (16–18 May 2014)

- Prize pool: $250,000
- Format: Block Constructed, Booster Draft (Journey into Nyx-Born of the Gods-Theros)
- Attendance: 349

=== Top 8 ===
Quarter-finals
1	Patrick Chapin	2
8	Jamie Parke	1
4	Josh Utter-Leyton	2
5	Stanislav Cifka	1
2	Reid Duke	0
7	Yuuki Ichikawa	2
3	Andrea Mengucci	1
6	Nam Sung-Wook	2

Semi-finals
Patrick Chapin	2
Josh Utter-Leyton	0
Yuuki Ichikawa	0
Nam Sung-Wook	2

Finals
Patrick Chapin	3
Nam Sung-Wook	1

=== Final standings ===
Place	Player	Prize	Pro Points	Comment
1	(United States) Patrick Chapin	$40,000	30	5th final day
2	(South Korea) Nam Sung-Wook	$20,000	24	1st South Korean in a Top 8
3	(United States) Josh Utter-Leyton	$12,500	22	5th final day
4	(Japan) Yuuki Ichikawa	$12,500	22	
5	(United States) Reid Duke	$10,000	20	
6	(Italy) Andrea Mengucci	$10,000	20	
7	(Czech Republic) Stanislav Cifka	$10,000	20	2nd final day
8	(United States) Jamie Parke	$10,000	20	3rd final day

== Grand Prix ==
GP Atlanta (24–25 May 2014)

- Format: Limited
- Attendance: 1299
1. (Canada) Jon Stern
2. (Japan) Tomoharu Saito
3. (United States) William Jensen
4. (United States) Charley Murdock
5. (United States) Alex Majlaton
6. (Canada) Shaun McLaren
7. (United States) Chris Fennell
8. (Indonesia) Vidianto Wijaya

GP Manchester (31 May–1 June 2014)

- Format: Block Constructed
- Attendance: 1406
1. (Venezuela) Fabrizio Anteri
2. (Hungary) Tamás Glied
3. (Germany) Sebastian Knörr
4. (Austria) Valentin Mackl
5. (Scotland) Bradley Barclay
6. (Germany) Nikolas Labahn
7. (Portugal) Marcio Carvalho
8. (Spain) Juan Carlos Adebo Díaz

GP São Paulo (31 May–1 June 2014)

- Format: Team Limited
- Attendance: 945 (315 teams)

1.

(Brazil) Carlos Alexandre Dos Santos Esteves
(Brazil) Guilherme Medeiros Merjam
(Brazil) Tulio Jaudy

2.

(Brazil) Marcos Paulo Santiago Brandt
(Brazil) Eduardo dos Santos Vieira
(Brazil) Cezar H. Choji

3.

(Brazil) Walter Perez
(Brazil) Paulo Ricardo Cortez
(Brazil) Lucas Esper Berthoud

4.

(United States) Ian Thomas Farnung
(United States) Stephen Berrios
(United States) Armando Bulnes

GP Moscow (14–15 June 2014)

- Format: Standard
- Attendance: 532
1. (Russia) Igor Gorbunov
2. (Russia) Sergey Zheleznov
3. (Russia) Alexey Rogov
4. (Ukraine) Sergiy Sushalskyy
5. (Russia) Dmitriy Butakov
6. (Hong Kong) Lee Shi Tian
7. (Russia) Efim Kashapov
8. (South Africa) Keraan Chetty

GP Milan (28–29 June 2014)

- Format: Limited
- Attendance: 1146
1. (France) Jérémy Dezani
2. (Switzerland) Nico Bohny
3. (Portugal) Marcio Carvalho
4. (Slovakia) Ivan Floch
5. (Switzerland) Serafin Wellinger
6. (Russia) Evgeny Pestov
7. (Italy) Guido Citino
8. (France) Timothée Simonot

GP Chicago (21–22 June 2014)

- Format: Standard
- Attendance: 2041
1. (Canada) Tyler Blum
2. (United States) Jadine Klomparens
3. (United States) Adrian Sullivan
4. (Japan) Yuuta Takahashi
5. (United States) Jared Boettcher
6. (United States) Oscar Jones
7. (United States) Steve Wise
8. (United States) Steve Rubin

GP Boston (26–27 July 2014)

- Format: Modern
- Attendance: 1461
1. (Slovenia) Robin Dolar
2. (United States) Andrew Boswell
3. (United States) Philip Napoli
4. (United States) Alex Bertoncini
5. (Canada) Nathan Jones
6. (United States) Wesley Hovanec
7. (France) Pierre Dagen
8. (Germany) Marc Tobiasch

GP Washington, D.C. (28–29 June 2014)

- Format: Limited
- Attendance: 1422
1. (United States) Mike Sigrist
2. (Japan) Yuuya Watanabe
3. (Hong Kong) Wing Chun Yam
4. (United States) Alexander John
5. (United States) William Jensen
6. (United States) Christian Calcano
7. (United States) Charles League
8. (United States) David Fulk

GP Taipei (26–27 July 2014)

- Format: Limited
- Attendance: 982
1. (Taiwan) Huang Hao-Shan
2. (Taiwan) Ciang Lyu Li
3. (Singapore) Ryan Luo
4. (Taiwan) Cheng Tung Yi
5. (Japan) Kazuyuki Takimura
6. (Malaysia) Joe Soh
7. (Hong Kong) Chung Ngai Shair
8. (Indonesia) Steven Setya

== Pro Tour Magic 2015 ==
Portland (1–3 August 2014)

- Prize pool: $250,000
- Format: Standard, Booster Draft
- Attendance: 358

=== Top 8 ===
Quarter-finals
1	Pat Cox	0
8	Owen Turtenwald	2
4	Ivan Floch	2
5	Matthew Sperling	0
2	Yuuki Ichikawa	1
7	Jackson Cunningham	2
3	William Jensen	0
6	Pierre Mondon	2

Semi-finals
Owen Turtenwald	1
Ivan Floch	2
Jackson Cunningham	2
Pierre Mondon	1

Finals
Ivan Floch	3
Jackson Cunningham	2

=== Final standings ===
Place	Player	Prize	Pro Points	Comment
1	(Slovakia) Ivan Floch	$40,000	30	
2	(Canada) Jackson Cunningham	$20,000	24	Pro tour debut
3	(United States) Pierre Mondon	$12,500	22	
4	(United States) Owen Turtenwald	$12,500	22	2nd final day
5	(United States) Pat Cox	$10,000	20	2nd final day
6	(Japan) Yuuki Ichikawa	$10,000	20	2nd final day
7	(United States) William Jensen	$10,000	20	5th final day
8	(United States) Matthew Sperling	$10,000	20	

== Pro Player of the Year final standings ==
The 2013–14 Pro Tour season ended after Pro Tour Magic 2015. These are the final standings of the Player of the Year race, including every player who at the end of the season reached Platinum, the highest Pro Club Level.

Place	Player	Pro Points	Place	Player	Pro Points	Place	Player	Pro Points
1	(France) Jérémy Dezani	86	11	(United States) Patrick Chapin	52	18	(United States) Ben Stark	47
2	(United States) Owen Turtenwald	73	11	(Japan) Yuuya Watanabe	52	18	(Japan) Kentaro Yamamoto	47
3	(United States) Reid Duke	72	13	(Japan) Yuuki Ichikawa	51	23	(United States) Eric Froehlich	46
4	(United States) William Jensen	63	13	(United States) Sam Black	51	23	(Germany) Patrick Dickmann	46
5	(Slovakia) Ivan Floch	62	15	(Canada) Jacob Wilson	50	23	(Israel) Shahar Shenhar	46
6	(Czech Republic) Stanislav Cifka	58	15	(Hong Kong) Lee Shi Tian	50	23	(Czech Republic) Martin Jůza	46
7	(Canada) Shaun McLaren	55	17	(United States) Jared Boettcher	49	23	(France) Raphaël Lévy	46
8	(United States) Tom Martell	54	18	(United States) Josh McClain	47	28	(South Korea) Nam Sung-Wook	45
8	(United States) Josh Utter-Leyton	54	18	(United States) Chris Fennell	47			
10	(United States) Paul Rietzl	53	18	(Canada) Alexander Hayne	47			

== Invitees to the 2014 World Championship ==
The following twenty-four players received an invitation to the 2014 World Championship due to their performance in the 2013–14 season.

Player	Qualified due to
(France) Jérémy Dezani	2013–14 Player of the Year
(United States) Raymond Perez Jr.*	2013–14 Rookie of the Year
(Israel) Shahar Shenhar	2013 World Champion
(France) Raphaël Lévy	2013 World Magic Cup winner
(Denmark) Lars Dam	2013 Magic Online Champion
(Canada) Shaun McLaren	Pro Tour Born of the Gods winner
(United States) Patrick Chapin	Pro Tour Journey into Nyx winner
(Slovakia) Ivan Floch	Pro Tour Magic 2015 winner
(United States) Owen Turtenwald	Pro Point leader North America
(United States) Reid Duke	Pro Point runner-up North America
(Brazil) Willy Edel	Pro Point leader Latin America
(Brazil) Paulo Vitor Damo da Rosa	Pro Point runner-up Latin America
(Hong Kong) Lee Shi Tian	Pro Point leader APAC region
(South Korea) Nam Sung-Wook	Pro Point runner-up APAC region
(Japan) Yuuya Watanabe	Pro Point leader Japan
(Japan) Yuuki Ichikawa	Pro Point runner-up Japan
(United States) William Jensen	Most Pro Points of otherwise unqualified
(Czech Republic) Stanislav Cifka	2nd most Pro Points of otherwise unqualified
(United States) Josh Utter-Leyton	3rd most Pro Points of otherwise unqualified
(United States) Tom Martell	4th most Pro Points of otherwise unqualified
(United States) Paul Rietzl	5th most Pro Points of otherwise unqualified
(United States) Sam Black	6th most Pro Points of otherwise unqualified
(Canada) Jacob Wilson	7th most Pro Points of otherwise unqualified
(Japan) Kentaro Yamamoto	8th most Pro Points of otherwise unqualified

* = Originally, Jared Boettcher had been declared Rookie of the Year, but when he was suspended by the DCI for cheating, his rookie title was also revoked and passed down to Raymond Perez Jr.
