= Jamie Parke =

American Magic: the Gathering player

- Nationality: American
- Pro Tour debut: Pro Tour Chicago 1997
- Pro Tour wins (Top 8): 0 (3)
- Grand Prix wins (Top 8): 0 (4)
- Lifetime Pro Points: 201

Jamie Parke is an American Magic: the Gathering player. His major successes include four Grand Prix top eights and three Pro Tour top eights. He is known for the extensive time periods between his results; during the coverage of Pro Tour Journey into Nyx, one commentator jokingly remarked that Parke made the top eight of a Pro Tour once per decade.

== Achievements ==
Season	Event type	Location	Format	Date	Rank
1998–99	Worlds	Tokyo	Special	4–8 August 1999	6
2000–01	Grand Prix	New Orleans	Sealed and Booster Draft	6–7 January 2001	7
2008	Grand Prix	Indianapolis	Sealed and Booster Draft	21–22 June 2008	3
2008	Worlds	Memphis	Special	11–14 December 2008	2
2013–14	Grand Prix	Richmond	Modern	8–9 March 2014	6
2013–14	Pro Tour	Atlanta	Block Constructed and Booster Draft	16–18 May 2014	8
2014–15	Grand Prix	Salt Lake City	Sealed and Booster Draft	6–7 September 2014	6

Last updated: 20 November 2014
Source: Event Coverage at Wizards.com
