= Yuuya Watanabe =

Japanese Magic: The Gathering player

- Nationality: (Japan) Japanese
- Pro Tour debut: 2007 Pro Tour Yokohama
- Winnings: $400,525
- Pro Tour wins (Top 8): 0 (5)
- Grand Prix wins (Top 8): 7 (28)
- Lifetime Pro Points: 643
- Planeswalker Level: 50 (Archmage)

Yuuya Watanabe (渡辺雄也) is a Japanese Magic: The Gathering player and former World Champion.^{[I]} With five Pro Tour top eights and 27 Grand Prix top eights (including seven wins), Watanabe is best known for his Rookie of the Year title in 2007, and his Player of the Year titles in 2009 and 2012. He is one of only three players to become Player of the Year more than once. He was elected to the Magic: The Gathering Hall of Fame in 2016, along with Owen Turtenwald, but removed in May 2019 after a cheating scandal involving marked card sleeves.

== Career ==
Watanabe's professional Magic career began in 2007 at Grand Prix Kyoto. He emerged as the champion from a top eight of relatively unknown players, something former Player of the Year Kenji Tsumura had predicted on day one of the tournament. This qualified him for his first Pro Tour, Yokohama, held about a month later. Despite not making another top eight that season at either the Pro Tour or Grand Prix level, strong finishes at Pro Tour San Diego (22nd) with teammate Shuhei Nakamura, and at Pro Tour Valencia (21st) were enough for him to win the Rookie of the Year title.

The following season Watanabe did not perform as well on the Pro Tour, with a 35th-place finish at the World Championship being his best finish. However, off Tour he did have some stand-out finishes. A third place standing at the Japanese National Championship earned him a place on the Japanese national team. Along with his national team colleagues Masashi Oiso and Akihiro Takakuwa, Watanabe made the semifinals of the national team competition at Worlds, where Japan lost to the United States team.

In 2009, Watanabe achieved a strong season, though the first half was somewhat unimpressive. He was able to offset the deficit of earning only the minimum two Pro Points at Kyoto and Honolulu with a second-place finish behind Tomoharu Saitou at Grand Prix Kobe. The second half on the other hand was nothing short of spectacular, with Watanabe making the top eight in six consecutive premier level events. The run began with a second-place finish at Japanese Nationals behind his San Diego teammate Shuhei Nakamura. After this finish, Watanabe made the top eight of four back-to-back Grand Prix in Bangkok, Niigata, Prague, and Melbourne, winning the last of these. This gave him the lead in the player of the year race going into Pro Tour Austin, and made him the first non-Australian to win a Grand Prix in Australia. A year and a half after his Pro Tour debut, Watanabe made his first Pro Tour top eight at Pro Tour Austin. He lost his quarterfinal match in five games to Hunter Burton. After a 62nd-place finish at the next event, Grand Prix Tampa, Watanabe pick up right where he left off with another Grand Prix top eight in Kitakyushu. Despite not doing very well at the World Championship, finishing 101st individually and 7th with the Japanese team that were favourites to win the tournament, none of Watanabe's competitors for Player of the Year were able to capitalise, and he was awarded the title at the end of the tournament.

During the 2012 season, his most successful season yet, Watanabe reached three Grand Prix top 8s, winning two of them (Kuala Lumpur and Manila) and thus securing his participation, as the Japanese player with the most Pro Points, to the first Magic Players Championship, which he eventually won by defeating his fellow countryman Shouta Yasooka in the final. Since the tournament replaced the briefly retired Pro Player of the Year title, Watanabe also became the second Magic player after Kai Budde to earn this title more than once. Later that year, at Pro Tour Return to Ravnica, Watanabe got his second Pro Tour top eight, losing in the final to Stanislav Cifka. The next year's Players Championship was renamed to the World Championship, with Watanabe receiving an invitation as the winner of the Players Championship. He went on to finish 6th at the event.

At Grand Prix Beijing 2014, Watanabe won his seventh Grand Prix title, equalling the all-time record for Grand Prix wins held by Kai Budde. With seven Grand Prix wins in 21 total Grand Prix Top 8s, six more than Kai Budde, Watanabe was for a time the most successful Grand Prix player in the history of the game, until Shuhei Nakamura won GP Dallas in July 2015. His performance during the season earned him an invitation to the 2014 World Championship.

Watanabe started the next season strongly, making the top eight of the first Pro Tour of the 2014–15 season, Pro Tour Khans of Tarkir, where he lost in the quarterfinal to eventual champion Ari Lax. At the 2014 World Championship in December, Watanabe came close to becoming the first repeat World Champion, finishing the Swiss portion of the tournament in first place. However, it was his semifinal opponent Shahar Shenhar who would go on to claim his second Worlds title. He ended the season on 59 points, resulting in an eight-place finish in the Player of the Year standings, as well as an invitation to the 2015 World Championship. He was the only player to have qualified for the first 6 invite-only World Championships since the format change after the 2011 Pro Tour season. His streak was broken at the 2018 World Championship where he failed to qualify.

Watanabe was disqualified at Mythic Championship II for cheating by using marked card sleeves. After an investigation, Wizards of the Coast determined that he had intentionally marked several key cards in his deck, which would allow him to identify a card before drawing it and make decisions based on that information. As a consequence of this, they banned him from organized events for 30 months, removed him from the Magic Pro League, and removed him from the Magic: The Gathering Hall of Fame.

== Achievements ==
=== Top 8 appearances ===
Season	Event type	Location	Format	Date	Rank
2007	Grand Prix	Kyoto	Standard	17–18 March 2007	1
2008	Nationals	Yokohama	Standard and Booster Draft	19–21 September 2008	3
2008	Worlds	Memphis, Tennessee	National team	11–14 December 2008	4
2009	Grand Prix	Kobe	Extended	18–19 April 2009	2
2009	Nationals	Hiroshima	Standard and Booster Draft	18–20 July 2009	2
2009	Grand Prix	Bangkok	Sealed and Booster Draft	22–23 August 2009	6
2009	Grand Prix	Niigata, Niigata	Sealed and Booster Draft	29–30 August 2009	8
2009	Grand Prix	Prague	Sealed and Booster Draft	5–6 September 2009	2
2009	Grand Prix	Melbourne	Sealed and Booster Draft	10–11 October 2009	1
2009	Pro Tour	Austin, Texas	Extended and Booster Draft	16–18 October 2009	6
2009	Grand Prix	Kitakyushu	Sealed and Booster Draft	31 October–1 November 2009	5
2010	Grand Prix	Sendai	Standard	5–6 June 2010	6
2010	Grand Prix	Manila	Standard	12–13 June 2010	4
2010	Grand Prix	Sydney	Sealed and Booster Draft	9–10 October 2010	5
2011	Grand Prix	Kansas City, Missouri	Sealed and Booster Draft	18–19 June 2011	2
2011	Grand Prix	Shanghai	Sealed and Booster Draft	20–21 August 2011	1
2011	Grand Prix	Pittsburgh	Standard	27–28 August 2011	1
2012	Grand Prix	Kobe	Sealed and Booster Draft	18–19 February 2012	7
2012	Grand Prix	Kuala Lumpur	Standard	24–25 March 2012	1
2012–13	Grand Prix	Manila	Standard	16–17 June 2012	1
2012–13	Players Championship	Seattle	Special	29–31 August 2012	1
2012–13	Pro Tour	Seattle	Modern and Booster Draft	19–21 October 2012	2
2012–13	Grand Prix	Philadelphia	Sealed and Booster Draft	27–28 October 2012	8
2012–13	Grand Prix	Taipei	Sealed and Booster Draft	24–25 November 2012	6
2013–14	Grand Prix	Bangkok	Sealed and Booster Draft	22–23 June 2013	4
2013–14	Grand Prix	Beijing	Standard	29–30 March 2014	1
2013–14	Grand Prix	Washington DC	Limited	28–29 June 2014	2
2014–15	Pro Tour	Honolulu	Standard and Booster Draft	10–12 October 2014	7
2014–15	Worlds	Nice	Special	2–7 December 2014	3
2014–15	Grand Prix	Cleveland	Limited	14–15 March 2015	7
2015–16	Grand Prix	Beijing	Team Limited	24–25 October 2015	2
2015–16	World Magic Cup	Barcelona	National team	11–13 December 2015	8
2015–16	Grand Prix	Minneapolis	Standard	28–29 May 2016	8
2016–17	Grand Prix	Chiba	Legacy	26–27 November 2016	3
2016–17	Pro Tour	Nashville	Standard and Booster Draft	12–14 May 2017	2
2016–17	Nationals	Shizuoka	Standard and Booster Draft	9–10 September 2017	3
2017–18	World Magic Cup	Nice	National team	1–3 December 2017	1
2018–19	Pro Tour	Atlanta	Standard and Booster Draft	9–11 November 2018	8

Last updated: 11 September 2017
Source: Event Coverage at Wizards.com

Other accomplishments

- Pro Tour Rookie of the Year 2007
- Pro Tour Player of the Year 2009, 2012
- Magic: the Gathering World Champion 2012^{[I]}
- World Magic Cup Champion 2017

== Notes ==
^I Watanabe has never won an event called the World Championship. However, the Players Championship, which he won in 2012, was later changed to the World Championship, and Watanabe is therefore considered the 2012 World Champion.

Preceded by (Germany) Sebastian Thaler	Rookie of the Year; 2007	Succeeded by (Australia) Aaron Nicastri
Preceded by (Japan) Shuhei Nakamura	Pro Player of the Year; 2009	Succeeded by (United States) Brad Nelson
Preceded by (United States) Owen Turtenwald	Pro Player of the Year; 2012	Succeeded by (United States) Josh Utter-Leyton
Preceded by (Japan) Jun'ya Iyanaga	Magic World Champion; 2012	Succeeded by (Israel) Shahar Shenhar
Preceded by Ryuuichirou Ishida	Japanese National Champion; 2012–2015	Succeeded by Shouta Yasooka
