= David Ochoa (Magic: The Gathering player) =

American Magic: The Gathering player

- Nickname: Webster
- Nationality: American
- Pro Tour debut: Pro Tour Philadelphia 2005
- Winnings: $112,055
- Pro Tour wins (Top 8): 0 (1)
- Grand Prix wins (Top 8): 0 (5)
- Lifetime Pro Points: 268
- Planeswalker Level: 49 (Archmage)

David Ochoa is an American Magic: The Gathering player and longtime member of Team ChannelFireball. Although a Vintage specialist, Ochoa has experienced success at the Magic: the Gathering Pro Tour, with a top 8 finish at Pro Tour Return to Ravnica as well as five Grand Prix top 8 finishes.

== Achievements ==
Season	Event type	Location	Format	Date	Rank
2009	Grand Prix	Minneapolis	Limited	13–14 November 2009	6
2010	Nationals	Minneapolis	Standard and Booster Draft	20–22 August 2010	4
2010	Grand Prix	Portland	Limited	11–12 September 2010	7
2011	Nationals	Indianapolis	Standard and Booster Draft	5–7 August 2011	2
2012	Grand Prix	Austin	Limited	7–8 January 2012	6
2012	Grand Prix	Orlando	Standard	14–15 January 2012	8
2012–13	Grand Prix	San Jose, Costa Rica	Limited	15–16 September 2012	6
2012–13	Pro Tour	Seattle	Modern and Booster Draft	19–21 October 2012	3
2014–15	Grand Prix	Dallas/Fort Worth	Limited	25–26 July 2015	8

Last updated: 27 July 2015
Source: Wizards.com
