= Magic: The Gathering Pro Tour season 2012 =

2012 Pro Tour season
- Pro Player of the Year: (Japan) Yuuya Watanabe
- Rookie of the Year: (Canada) Alexander Hayne
- Pro Tours: 2 / 4
- Grands Prix: 16 / 26
- Hall of Fame inductions: n/a
- Start of season: 13 June 2011 / 7 January 2012
- End of season: 13 May 2012

The 2012 Pro Tour season is the seventeenth season of the Magic: The Gathering Pro Tour. Due to major changes in the Pro Tour systems the 2012 season was retroactively made to overlap with the 2011 season. Originally the 2012 season was supposed to begin on 7 January 2012 with Grand Prix Austin, but retroactively the events from after Pro Tour Nagoya on 10–12 June 2011 were made to count towards the 2012 season as well as the 2011 season. The major changes included a shift of the season. Instead of Pro Tour seasons aligning with the calendar year, beginning with the 2012–13 season Pro Tour seasons will be going from spring to spring. Also a major overhaul of the ratings system was conducted. A new bye policy based upon the new ratings system and a new invitation policy for the Pro Tour were introduced. Finally the number of Grand Prix tournaments was greatly increased.

== Mode ==
Four Pro Tours will be held in the 2012 season. The amount of Grand Prix is still unknown as only Grand Prix tournaments through March have been announced yet. The prize purse of future Pro Tours is also unknown, however Wizards of the Coast announced, that future Grand Prix tournaments will have a total prize pool of $10,000 to $40,000 instead of a flat $30,000 pool that was awarded at each Grand Prix in 2011.

== Grand Prix: Austin, Orlando ==
GP Austin (7–8 January)

- Format: Limited
- Attendance: 1044
1. (France) Raphaël Lévy
2. (United States) Pat Cox
3. (United States) Craig Edwards
4. (United States) Eric Downing
5. (Canada) Jason Howden
6. (United States) David Ochoa
7. (United States) Austin Bursavich
8. (United States) David Saylor

GP Orlando (14–15 January)

- Format: Standard
- Attendance: 926
1. (United States) Conley Woods
2. (United States) Patrick Chapin
3. (Brazil) Paulo Vitor Damo da Rosa
4. (United States) Stephen Mann
5. (United States) Gabriel Nieves
6. (United States) Ben Friedman
7. (United States) Javier Adorno
8. (United States) David Ochoa

== Pro Tour Dark Ascension – Honolulu (10–12 February 2012) ==
The first Pro Tour in the 2012 season is the first to have a proper name. Previously Pro Tours were referred to by their location and/or date. The name Dark Ascension refers to the Magic set with the same name that is to be released a week prior to the Pro Tour.

=== Tournament data ===
Prize pool: $233,500
Format: Standard, Booster Draft
Players: 445

=== Top 8 ===
Quarter-finals
1	Paulo Vitor Damo da Rosa	3
8	Jelger Wiegersma	0
4	Mamoru Nagai	3
5	Lukas Blohon	1
2	Denniz Rachid	1
7	Brian Kibler	3
3	Jon Finkel	3
6	Matthew Costa	1

Semi-finals
Paulo Vitor Damo da Rosa	3
Mamoru Nagai	1
Brian Kibler	3
Jon Finkel	2

Finals
Paulo Vitor Damo da Rosa	2
Brian Kibler	3

=== Final standings ===
Place	Player	Prize	Pro Points	Comment
1	(United States) Brian Kibler	$40,000	30	5th Final day, 2nd Pro Tour win
2	(Brazil) Paulo Vitor Damo da Rosa	$20,000	24	9th Final day
3	(United States) Jon Finkel	$12,500	22	13th Final day
4	(Japan) Mamoru Nagai	$12,500	22	
5	(Sweden) Denniz Rachid	$10,000	20	
6	(United States) Matthew Costa	$10,000	20	
7	(Czech Republic) Lukas Blohon	$10,000	20	
8	(Netherlands) Jelger Wiegersma	$10,000	20	4th Final day

== Grand Prix: Kobe, Lincoln, Madrid, Baltimore, Lille, Seattle, Indianapolis, Nashville, Kuala Lumpur, Mexico City, Melbourne, Salt Lake City, Turin, Manchester ==
GP Kobe (18–19 February)

- Format: Limited
- Attendance: 1117
1. (Japan) Masahiro Hiraga
2. (Japan) Ken Yukuhiro
3. (Japan) Kouji Takeishi
4. (Japan) Hiroaki Kitahara
5. (Japan) Katsuhiro Mori
6. (Japan) Hiroshi Ishida
7. (Japan) Yuuya Watanabe
8. (Japan) Takayuki Nagaoka

GP Baltimore (25–26 February)

- Format: Standard
- Attendance: 1545
1. (United States) Matthew Costa
2. (United States) David Shiels
3. (United States) Jackie Lee
4. (United States) Matt Scott
5. (Brazil) Paulo Vitor Damo da Rosa
6. (United States) Max Tietze
7. (United States) Eric Meng
8. (United States) Adam Snook

GP Indianapolis (10–11 March)

- Format: Legacy
- Attendance: 1214
1. (United States) Tom Martell
2. (United States) Kenny Castor
3. (United States) Dan Jordan
4. (United States) Colin Chilbert
5. (United States) Ando Ferguson
6. (United States) Caleb Durward
7. (Canada) Pascal Maynard
8. (United States) Adam Yurchick

GP Mexico City (24–25 March)

- Format: Limited
- Attendance: 685
1. (United States) Paul Rietzl
2. (Venezuela) Humberto Patarca
3. (United States) Craig Wescoe
4. (Mexico) Daniel Hernandez
5. (Canada) Pascal Maynard
6. (Mexico) Mario Flores
7. (Germany) Gottlieb Yeh
8. (Mexico) Gustavo Nuñez Moreno

GP Turin (31 March–1 April)

- Format: Modern
- Attendance: 1063
1. (United States) Antonino De Rosa
2. (Germany) Michael Thiel
3. (Spain) Jose Velazquez
4. (Italy) Alessandro Lippi
5. (Italy) Marco Cammilluzzi
6. (Switzerland) Yann Blumer
7. (Italy) Alessandro Portaro
8. (Switzerland) David Progin

GP Lincoln (18–19 February)

- Format: Modern
- Attendance: 716
1. (United States) Bronson Magnan
2. (United States) Andrew Cuneo
3. (United States) Luis Scott-Vargas
4. (United States) Samuel Friedman
5. (United States) Mary Jacobson
6. (United States) Samuel Karls
7. (Canada) Matt Mercier
8. (United States) Derrick Rutledge

GP Lille (3–4 March)

- Format: Standard
- Attendance: 1505
1. (England) Richard Parker
2. (France) Simon Diaz
3. (Belgium) Kristof Benaets
4. (Belgium) Tom Valkeneers
5. (Germany) Manuel Mayer
6. (Germany) Jonas Köstler
7. (Poland) Grzegorz Kowalski
8. (Germany) Martin Zimmermann

GP Nashville (17–18 March)

- Format: Limited
- Attendance: 1037
1. (United States) Reid Duke
2. (United States) Todd Anderson
3. (United States) Kyle Babin
4. (United States) Josh Utter-Leyton
5. (United States) Caleb Durward
6. (United States) Robbie Cordell
7. (United States) Lissa Jensen
8. (Japan) Shuhei Nakamura

GP Melbourne (31 March–1 April)

- Format: Limited
- Attendance: 558
1. (Australia) David Crewe
2. (Australia) Geoff Zhao
3. (Australia) Oliver Oks
4. (Australia) Simon Harnden
5. (Australia) Thomas Rafferty
6. (Australia) Daniel Unwin
7. (Australia) Jeremy Neeman
8. (Australia) Hao Wu

GP Manchester (21–22 April)

- Format: Limited
- Attendance: 1028
1. (Belgium) Alexandre Darras
2. (Italy) Mario Pascoli
3. (Sweden) Joel Larsson
4. (Denmark) Lasse Nørgaard
5. (Germany) André Müller
6. (Belgium) Marijn Lybaert
7. (Italy) Ciro Bonaventura
8. (South Africa) Adam Katz

GP Madrid (25–26 February)

- Format: Limited
- Attendance: 1314
1. (Switzerland) Ivo Grossholz
2. (Spain) David Garcia Copete
3. (Netherlands) Guido Sondag
4. (Portugal) Fabio Rodrigues
5. (Germany) Christian von Kalkstein
6. (Germany) Florian Koch
7. (Italy) Marco Frantuma
8. (Czech Republic) Martin Juza

GP Seattle-Tacoma (3–4 March)

- Format: Limited
- Attendance: 1160
1. (Canada) Robert Smith
2. (United States) Iain Bartolomei
3. (United States) Jason Huang
4. (United States) James Nguyen
5. (United States) Andrejs Prost
6. (United States) Paul Rietzl
7. (United States) Henry Romero
8. (United States) Owen Turtenwald

GP Kuala Lumpur (24–25 March)

- Format: Standard
- Attendance: 612
1. (Japan) Yuuya Watanabe
2. (China) Xin Sui
3. (Thailand) Sutti Lee
4. (China) Chao Lu
5. (Thailand) Sukhum Kiwanont
6. (Taiwan) Kuo Tzu-Ching
7. (Hong Kong) Kingston Tong King Yim
8. (Malaysia) Jason Yap

GP Salt Lake City (31 March–1 April)

- Format: Standard
- Attendance: 1137
1. (United States) Shahar Shenhar
2. (United States) Michael Peterson
3. (United States) Tom Martell
4. (United States) James Cooper
5. (United States) Michael Hetrick
6. (United States) Bryan Olvera
7. (United States) David Gleicher
8. (Canada) Marcel Angelo Zafra

== Pro Tour Avacyn Restored – Barcelona (11–13 May 2012) ==
=== Tournament data ===
Prize pool: $233,500
Format: Block Constructed, Booster Draft
Players: 379

=== Top 8 ===
Quarter-finals
1	Gaudenis Vidugiris	3
8	Naoki Shimizu	2
4	Ken Yukuhiro	3
5	Denniz Rachid	2
2	Jon Finkel	2
7	Alexander Hayne	3
3	Joshua Cho	3
6	Thomas Holzinger	0

Semi-finals
Gaudenis Vidugiris	3
Ken Yukuhiro	2
Alexander Hayne	3
Joshua Cho	2

Finals
Gaudenis Vidugiris	2
Alexander Hayne	3

=== Final standings ===
Place	Player	Prize	Pro Points	Comment
1	(Canada) Alexander Hayne	$40,000	30	
2	(Lithuania) Gaudenis Vidugiris	$20,000	24	2nd final day
3	(United States) Joshua Cho	$12,500	22	Pro Tour debut
4	(Japan) Ken Yukuhiro	$12,500	22	
5	(United States) Jon Finkel	$10,000	20	14th final day
6	(Sweden) Denniz Rachid	$10,000	20	2nd final day
7	(Austria) Thomas Holzinger	$10,000	20	
8	(Japan) Naoki Shimizu	$10,000	20	2nd final day

== Invitees to the 2012 Players Championship ==
The following sixteen players received an invitation to the 2012 Players Championship due to their performance in the 2012 season.

Player	Qualified due to
(United States) Owen Turtenwald	2011 Player of the year
(Japan) Jun'ya Iyanaga	2011 World Champion
(United States) Reid Duke	2011 Magic Online Champion
(Italy) Samuele Estratti	Pro Tour Philadelphia winner
(United States) Brian Kibler	Pro Tour Dark Ascension winner
(Canada) Alexander Hayne	Pro Tour Avacyn Restored winner
(United States) Josh Utter-Leyton	Pro Point leader North America
(Brazil) Paulo Vitor Damo da Rosa	Pro Point leader Latin America
(Czech Republic) Martin Juza	Pro Point leader Europe
(Japan) Yuuya Watanabe	Pro Point leader Japan
(Taiwan) Kuo Tzu-Ching	Pro Point leader APAC region
(United States) Jon Finkel	Most Pro Points of otherwise unqualified
(United States) Luis Scott-Vargas	2nd most Pro Points of otherwise unqualified
(Japan) Shouta Yasooka	3rd most Pro Points of otherwise unqualified
(United States) David Ochoa	4th most Pro Points of otherwise unqualified
(Japan) Shuhei Nakamura	5th most Pro Points of otherwise unqualified
