= Owen Turtenwald =

American professional Magic: The Gathering player

- Nickname: ORAT
- Born: April 16, 1989 (age 37); West Allis, Wisconsin
- Nationality: (United States) American
- Pro Tour debut: Pro Tour Valencia 2007
- Winnings: US$345,570
- Pro Tour wins (Top 8): 0 (5)
- Grand Prix wins (Top 8): 4 (21)
- Lifetime Pro Points: 418

Owen Turtenwald (born April 16, 1989) is a former American professional Magic: The Gathering player. He won a number of awards during his career, notably the 2010 Vintage World Championship and 2011 and 2015-16 Player of the Year. In 2016, he was inducted into the Magic: The Gathering Hall of Fame. He was briefly a member of the Magic Pro League in 2019 before being removed following sexual harassment accusations from women in the Magic community. He has not participated in any Wizards of the Coast sanctioned Magic: The Gathering tournaments since the incident.

== Magic: The Gathering career ==
Owen Turtenwald first came to prominence as a player of Magic's eternal formats, Legacy and Vintage. In the 2007 season, Turtenwald made his first Top 8 at GP Columbus, finishing in second place with a Legacy Goblins deck and qualifying for PT Valencia (where he finished in 18th place with an Extended version of the Goblins deck). In 2008, Turtenwald made the Top 8 of the Vintage World Championship. At Gen Con 2010, Turtenwald won the 2010 Vintage World Championship defeating Bob Maher, Jr. in the finals.

Despite reaching the finals of GP Washington DC in the 2010 season, Turtenwald considered quitting, feeling as though he wasn't performing well enough for his efforts. However, he was persuaded to keep playing with the support of Team ChannelFireball.

In the 2011 season, Turtenwald made seven Grand Prix Top 8s, an at-the-time unprecedented number for a single season in a wide variety of formats, including Standard, Extended, Legacy, and Limited. However, Turtenwald failed to win any of the GPs at which he made Top 8, a fact that was very disappointing to him. Turtenwald's success caused him to hold the lead in the 2011 Player of the Year race for the majority of the season. On the final day of the 2011 World Championship, three players were in the position to take the Player of the Year title from Turtenwald. These players were Luis Scott-Vargas, Paulo Vitor Damo da Rosa, and Josh Utter-Leyton, all of whom were also Turtenwald's teammates as part of the ChannelFireball team. Turtenwald noted a sense of conflict in wanting his friends to do well but also needing them to lose if he was to take the Player of the Year title. Fortunately for Turtenwald, those three players lost their quarterfinal matches; Turtenwald won the 2011 Player of the Year title. In doing so, Turtenwald became the first Player of the Year to not have made a Pro Tour Top 8 in the season in which they won the title.

In the 2012-13 Season, Turtenwald practiced and prepared for tournaments with Team StarCityGames (currently known as Team Pantheon), alongside players such as Jon Finkel, Kai Budde and Reid Duke. Shortly thereafter, Turtenwald made his first PT Top 8 at Pro Tour Gatecrash. Turtenwald lost his quarterfinal match against ChannelFireball member Eric Froehlich but still finished in fifth place in the event.

Turtenwald continued to hold the record for most GP Top 8 appearances without a win (11), but in the 2013-14 Season, Turtenwald won GP Washington DC, his 12th GP Top 8. Turtenwald continued this success, winning the next GP in Albuquerque. In doing so, Turtenwald became the sixth player to win back-to-back GP events, the other five players to have achieved this feat being Kenji Tsumura, Kai Budde, Raphaël Lévy, Tomoharu Saito, and Yuuya Watanabe. Turtenwald went on to finish the season with his second PT Top 8 at Pro Tour Magic 2015, where he lost in the semifinals to eventual champion Ivan Floch. Thanks to his fourth-place finish, Turtenwald earned captainship of the US national team for the 2014 World Magic Cup. He also qualified for the 2014 World Championship as the top-ranked North American player.

Turtenwald, alongside teammates William Jensen and Reid Duke, won GP Portland, the very first event of the 2014–15 Season. At Pro Tour Khans of Tarkir in Honolulu later that year, Turtenwald looked poised to make his third PT Top 8, but he got paired down against Yuuya Watanabe in the last round and lost, finishing 11th in the event. At the 2014 World Championship, he finished 13th, but at the 2014 World Magic Cup, he captained the US national team to a fourth-place finish, losing to Greece in the semifinals. Turtenwald ended the season with 55 pro points, good enough for platinum status in the Pro Player Club and an invitation to the 2015 World Championship. He finished second, losing the Championship to Seth Manfield.

Turtenwald's 2015-16 season began with a Top 8 finish at PT Battle for Zendikar. His powerful performance continued throughout the season with three more GP Top 8s and a win at GP Houston that put him in contention for a second Player of the Year title. However, Seth Manfield's late-season performance would put him twenty points ahead of Turtenwald heading into PT Eldritch Moon. In the wake of his Hall of Fame induction alongside Yuuya Watanabe, Turtenwald secured his fourth PT Top 8, finishing in second place, which deposed Seth Manfield as Player of the Year and World Magic Cup captaincy. His finish with 98 points was the first for Player of the Year to finish above 90 points since Kai Budde in 2002; he became the third player to have two Player of the Year titles, after Budde and Watanabe.

In 2019, Turtenwald became one of the original 32 members of the Magic Pro League (MPL) - an esports competition of professional Magic: The Gathering players contracted through Wizards of the Coast.

On March 26, 2019, and just a day prior to the first Magic: The Gathering Mythic Invitational, the esports division of Wizards of the Coast announced on Twitter that Turtenwald would not participate in the tournament. He was replaced by Brian David-Marshall. Two days after the announcement, Kotaku published an article claiming that multiple people had come forward accusing Turtenwald of engaging in "inappropriate behavior toward female players and fans for years." To date, neither Turtenwald nor Wizards of the Coast have addressed these claims, and there have been no public statements by either party regarding Turtenwald's removal from the Mythic Invitational.

A month after Turtenwald's sudden removal from the Mythic Invitational, Turtenwald's name was removed from the official Magic Pro League roster on Wizards of the Coast's website. Kotaku released an article stating that Turtenwald's now-vacant spot in the Magic Pro League would be filled by Autumn Burchett, the professional player who won Mythic Championship I in February 2019. Turtenwald has since deleted his public social media content and has not participated in any sanctioned Magic: The Gathering events.

=== Achievements ===
Season	Event type	Location	Format	Date	Rank
2007	Grand Prix	Columbus	Legacy	May 19–20, 2007	2
2009	Grand Prix	Minneapolis	Sealed and Booster Draft	November 13–14, 2009	5
2010	Grand Prix	Washington D.C.	Standard	May 22–23, 2010	2
2011	Grand Prix	Atlanta	Extended	January 22–23, 2011	8
2011	Grand Prix	Denver	Sealed and Booster Draft	February 19–20, 2011	3
2011	Grand Prix	Dallas/Fort Worth	Standard	April 9–10, 2011	3
2011	Grand Prix	Providence	Legacy	May 28–29, 2011	5
2011	Grand Prix	Singapore	Standard	June 4–5, 2011	4
2011	Grand Prix	Santiago	Sealed and Booster Draft	October 22–23, 2011	3
2011	Grand Prix	San Diego	Sealed and Booster Draft	November 12–13, 2011	6
2012	Grand Prix	Seattle	Sealed and Booster Draft	March 3–4, 2012	8
2012–13	Grand Prix	San Jose	Team Limited	October 9–10, 2012	3 ^{[I]}
2012–13	Pro Tour	Montreal	Standard and Booster Draft	February 15–17, 2013	5
2013–14	Grand Prix	Washington, D.C.	Legacy	November 16–17, 2013	1
2013–14	Grand Prix	Albuquerque	Standard	November 23–24, 2013	1
2013–14	Grand Prix	Barcelona	Team Limited	March 1–2, 2014	3
2013–14	Pro Tour	Portland	Standard and Booster Draft	August 1–3, 2014	4
2014–15	Grand Prix	Portland	Team Limited	August 9–10, 2014	1
2014–15	World Magic Cup	Nice	National team	December 5–7, 2014	4
2015–16	Grand Prix	Detroit	Team Limited	August 15–16, 2015	3
2015–16	Worlds	Seattle	Special	August 28–30, 2015	2
2015–16	Pro Tour	Milwaukee	Standard and Booster Draft	October 16–18, 2015	5
2015–16	Grand Prix	Atlanta	Sealed and Booster Draft	November 13–15, 2015	2
2015–16	Grand Prix	Houston	Standard	February 27–28, 2016	1
2015–16	Grand Prix	Washington, D.C.	Team Limited	March 12–13, 2016	3
2015–16	Grand Prix	Minneapolis	Standard	May 28–29, 2016	6
2015–16	Pro Tour	Sydney	Standard and Booster Draft	August 5–7, 2016	2
2016–17	Grand Prix	San Antonio	Team Unified Modern	April 1–2, 2017	2
2016-17	Grand Prix	Cleveland	Team Limited	June 24–25, 2017	1
2017-18	Grand Prix	Providence	Team Limited	September 30–October 1, 2017	2

Last updated: April 9, 2018
Source: Event Coverage at Wizards.com

== Notes ==
^I Turtenwald finished third at Grand Prix San Jose 2012 with teammates Conley Woods and Eric Froehlich, and although the cutoff was to the top 2 teams instead of the usual top 4 for team events, it has been recognized as a counting Grand Prix top 8 finish by Wizards of the Coast.

Preceded by (United States) Brad Nelson	Pro Player of the Year; 2011	Succeeded by (Japan) Yuuya Watanabe
Preceded by (United States) Mike Sigrist	Pro Player of the Year; 2016	Succeeded by (Brazil) Paulo Vitor Damo da Rosa
Preceded by Josh Utter-Leyton	US National Champion; 2014	Succeeded by Mike Sigrist
Preceded by Mike Sigrist	US National Champion; 2016	Succeeded by Incumbent
