= Reid Duke =

American Magic: The Gathering player

- Duke in TCGplayer branding in 2026
- Nickname: reiderrabbit Reid "the Bones" Duke The Dukeler
- Born: September 8, 1989 (age 37)
- Nationality: (United States) American
- Pro Tour debut: 2010 Pro Tour Amsterdam
- Winnings: US$278,875
- Pro Tour wins (Top 8): 1 (4)
- Grand Prix wins (Top 8): 6 (23)
- Lifetime Pro Points: 285
- Planeswalker Level: 50 (Archmage)

Reid Duke is an American Magic: The Gathering player from Sugar Loaf, New York. He won the Magic: The Gathering Online Championship in 2011. His best finishes include one Pro Tour win, at Pro Tour Phyrexia; three other Pro Tour Top 8s, at Pro Tour Journey Into Nyx, Pro Tour Eldritch Moon, and Pro Tour Rivals of Ixalan; a runner-up finish at the 2013 World Championships; five solo Grand Prix wins, at Grand Prix Nashville 2012, Grand Prix Miami 2013, Grand Prix Portland 2014, Grand Prix Oakland 2016, and Grand Prix Louisville 2017; and one team Grand Prix win, at Grand Prix Cleveland 2017.

== Magic: The Gathering career ==
Commonly referred to as "The gentleman of the Magic world", Reid Duke started playing in 1995, at age five, with his brother Ian Duke, who is now a member of the Magic: The Gathering R&D team at Wizards of the Coast. For a time, he was primarily a Magic: The Gathering Online player, but made the transition to in-person competitive play. He qualified for Pro Tour Amsterdam 2010 via rating, and won a Magic Online Championship Series (MOCS) event to qualify for the 2010 Magic Online World Championship, where he finished 5th, as well as the 2010 Magic: The Gathering World Championships in Chiba, Japan. Although his finishes in his first Pro Tour were unspectacular, he has not missed a Pro Tour since Amsterdam 2010.

Duke first experienced success at paper Magic in 2011, when he reached the top eight of two Grand Prix events: Grand Prix Providence, where he finished fourth, and Grand Prix Montreal, where he finished fifth. He also won another MOCS event to requalify him for the Magic Online Championship, this year held in San Francisco concurrently with the 2011 World Championships. Duke ended up winning the event, defeating Florian Pils in the final. This qualified him for the inaugural Players Championship event (later renamed the Magic World Championship). At Pro Tour Dark Ascension in Honolulu, Duke finished in the money at a Pro Tour for the first time, placing 38th. From here, he would go on to finish in the money in eight consecutive Pro Tours. He also won his first Grand Prix when he defeated Todd Anderson in the final of Grand Prix Nashville. He has since 2012 been a part of the team now known as 'The Pantheon', alongside players such as Jon Finkel, Kai Budde and Gabriel Nassif.

The 2012 Magic Players Championship did not go well for Duke; he finished the event with a 2–10 record, taking last place. Following this failure, Duke made it his mission to redeem himself by qualifying for next year's event and putting up a better performance, even going so far as to write down the mistakes he made in the tournament. Thanks to three Grand Prix top eight finishes, in Charleston, San Antonio and Quebec City, as well as stellar performance on the Pro Tour, he succeeded in requalifying for the World Championship when he finished 9th at Pro Tour Dragon's Maze in San Diego. He finished the 2012–13 season on 52 Pro Points, which was also sufficient for Platinum membership in the Pro Players Club.

Duke started the 2013–14 season well, winning his second Grand Prix, at GP Miami. Duke went on to dominate the Swiss rounds of the 2013 World Championship, finishing in first place before the knockout rounds. Duke faced Josh Utter-Leyton in the semifinals, defeating him 3–2. He was considered a substantial favorite against his final opponent, Shahar Shenhar, and did indeed take a 2–0 lead in the best-of-five match, but Shenhar came all the way back to beat Duke 3–2 in an upset. Duke thus took second place in the event. He put up three more Grand Prix top eight finishes during the season, in Detroit, Barcelona and Philadelphia, before finally posting a top eight performance at a Pro Tour. At Pro Tour Journey into Nyx in Atlanta, Duke finished fifth, losing in the quarterfinals to Yuuki Ichikawa. At this point, he was in position to win the 2013–14 Player of the Year title, but ultimately this was won by Jérémy Dezani. He was also overtaken by teammate Owen Turtenwald for captainship of the United States national team at the 2014 World Magic Cup when the latter made the top eight of the final event of the season, Pro Tour Magic 2015.

The 2014–15 season started really well for Duke, with him and his teammates Owen Turtenwald and William Jensen winning the very first Grand Prix of the season, Grand Prix Portland. At the 2014 World Championships, however, Duke posted a modest 14th-place finish, and his Pro Tour results throughout the season were average. He managed to reach two Grand Prix top eights, in Singapore and Montreal, towards the end of the season to retain Platinum status, but he did not qualify for the 2015 World Championships. In February 2015, Duke almost won a MOCS event for the third time, but lost in the final.

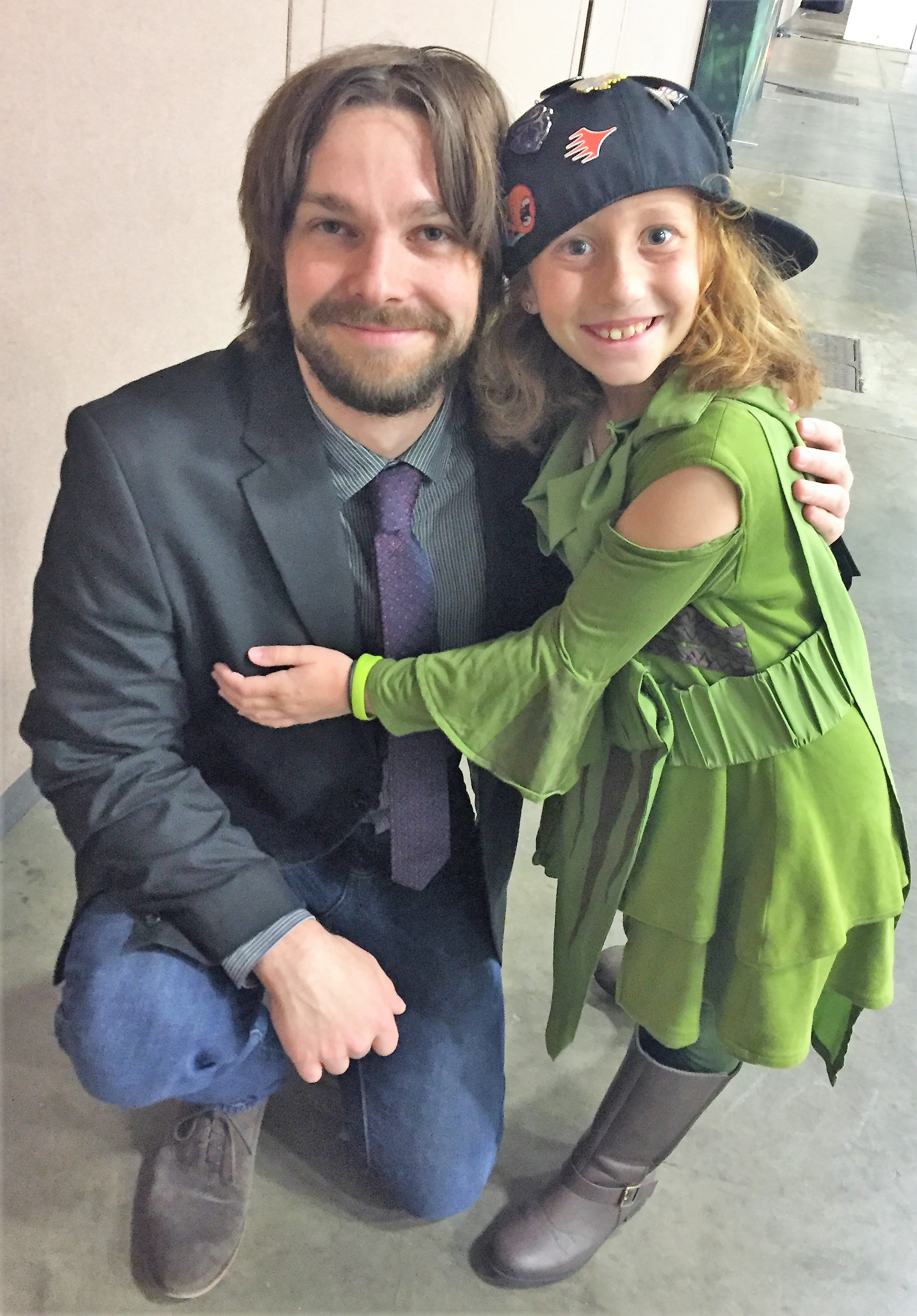
Duke with young competitive Magic player Dana Fischer in 2019

In 2019, Duke was elected into the Magic: The Gathering Hall of Fame.

In 2023, Duke won the Pro Tour Phyrexia, held in Philadelphia February 17–19.

=== Achievements ===
Season	Event type	Location	Format	Date	Rank
2011	Grand Prix	Providence	Legacy	May 28–29, 2011	3
2011	Grand Prix	Montreal	Limited	September 17–18, 2011	5
2011	MOCS	San Francisco	Special	November 17–20, 2011	1
2012	Grand Prix	Nashville	Limited	March 17–18, 2012	1
2012–13	Grand Prix	Charleston	Standard	November 17–18, 2012	5
2012–13	Grand Prix	San Antonio	Standard	November 24–25, 2012	4
2012–13	Grand Prix	Quebec City	Standard	February 22–23, 2013	4
2013–14	Grand Prix	Miami	Standard	June 29–30, 2013	1
2013–14	Worlds	Amsterdam	Special	July 31–August 4, 2013	2
2013–14	Grand Prix	Detroit	Modern	September 14–15, 2013	2
2013–14	Grand Prix	Barcelona	Team Limited	March 1–2, 2014	3
2013–14	Grand Prix	Philadelphia	Limited	April 12–13, 2014	2
2013–14	Pro Tour	Atlanta	Block Constructed and Booster Draft	May 16–18, 2014	5
2014–15	Grand Prix	Portland	Team Limited	August 9–10, 2014	1
2014–15	Grand Prix	Singapore	Modern	June 27–28, 2015	4
2014–15	Grand Prix	Montreal	Limited	July 4–5, 2015	6
2015–16	Grand Prix	Detroit	Team Limited	August 15–16, 2015	3
2015–16	Grand Prix	Quebec City	Standard	October 23–25, 2015	5
2015–16	Grand Prix	Oakland	Standard	January 9–10, 2016	1
2015–16	Grand Prix	Washington, D.C.	Team Limited	March 12–13, 2016	3
2015–16	Grand Prix	Barcelona	Limited	April 16–17, 2016	7
2015–16	Pro Tour	Sydney	Standard and Booster Draft	August 5–7, 2016	7
2016–17	Grand Prix	Louisville	Legacy	January 7–8, 2017	1
2016–17	Grand Prix	San Antonio	Team Unified Modern	April 1–2, 2017	2
2016–17	Grand Prix	Cleveland	Team Limited	June 24–25, 2017	1
2017–18	Grand Prix	Providence	Team Limited	September 30 – October 1, 2017	2
2017–18	Grand Prix	Phoenix	Limited	October 28–29, 2017	2
2017–18	Pro Tour	Bilbao	Modern and Booster Draft	February 2–4, 2018	6
2018–19	Mythic Championship	Cleveland	Standard	February 2–4, 2019	4
2023-24	Pro Tour	Philadelphia	Pioneer and Booster Draft	February 17–19, 2023	1

== Personal life ==
Duke graduated from Dartmouth College in 2011. He is the brother of Ian Duke who is a developer at Wizards of the Coast.
