= Josh Utter-Leyton =

American Magic: The Gathering player

- Nickname: Wrapter
- Nationality: (United States) American
- Pro Tour debut: Pro Tour Hollywood 2008
- Winnings: US$191,450
- Pro Tour wins (Top 8): 0 (6)
- Grand Prix wins (Top 8): 1 (9)
- Lifetime Pro Points: 332

Josh Utter-Leyton is an American Magic: The Gathering player. Perhaps most well known for his work with Team ChannelFireball, he was the American national champion in 2010 and 2013, and the Player of the Year for the 2012–13 season. He has reached the top 8 of six Pro Tours, losing to the eventual champion each time.

== Career ==
Utter-Leyton started playing Magic in 1994, but remained a casual player until 2005, when he started playing Magic Online. He made his Pro Tour debut at Pro Tour Hollywood 2008, and although his Pro Tour finishes in 2008 and 2009 were unimpressive, he managed to remain qualified for all the events, and he was one of the original members of Team ChannelFireball. His breakout performance was his 5th-place finish at Pro Tour San Juan 2010, where he lost in the quarterfinals to eventual champion Paulo Vitor Damo da Rosa. Three months later, Utter-Leyton won the United States National Championship, and in November he reached the top 8 of a Grand Prix for the first time. Though the US National Team would end up at a disappointing 15th place at the World Championships in Chiba, Utter-Leyton finished 16th individually, and with that earning Level 7 status in the Pro Players Club.

In the 2011 Pro Tour season, Utter-Leyton made two additional Pro Tour top 8s. At Pro Tour Philadelphia he lost in the final to Samuele Estratti, his 2nd-place finish there being his best Pro Tour finish to date. It was followed up by a 7th-place finish at the very next Pro Tour, the 2011 World Championships. He ended the year tied for 7th on 52 points, and Level 8 in the Pro Players Club.

Utter-Leyton was a part of the inaugural Players Championship in 2012, later renamed the World Championship, where he finished 13th. He made a total of five Grand Prix top 8s in 2012, and when he finished 4th at Pro Tour Dragon's Maze in San Diego, Utter-Leyton became the 2012–13 Player of the Year. This also made him the US National Champion for 2013, making Utter-Leyton the first American player to be a two-time National champion.

At the 2013 World Magic Cup, Utter-Leyton once again failed to put up a result with Team USA, finishing 18th. At the World Championship, however, Utter-Leyton reached the semifinals, where he was narrowly defeated 2–3 by Reid Duke. Later in the season, he finished 3rd in his fifth Pro Tour top 8 at Pro Tour Journey into Nyx, and qualified for the 2014 World Championship. Utter-Leyton was one of three players to have qualified for all three World Championships since the 2012 format change, the other two being Reid Duke and Yuuya Watanabe. He finished 11th in the event. However, despite earning 53 Pro Points and Platinum status after the 2014–15 season, Utter-Leyton did not qualify for the 2015 World Championship.

== Achievements ==
Season	Event type	Location	Format	Date	Rank
2010	Pro Tour	San Juan	Block Constructed and Booster Draft	28–30 May 2010	5
2010	Nationals	Minneapolis	Standard and Booster Draft	19–22 August 2010	1
2010	Grand Prix	Nashville	Sealed and Booster Draft	20–21 November 2010	5
2011	Grand Prix	Dallas	Standard	9–10 April 2011	6
2011	Pro Tour	Philadelphia	Modern and Booster Draft	2–4 September 2011	2
2011	Worlds	San Francisco	Special	17–20 November 2011	7
2012	Grand Prix	Nashville	Sealed and Booster Draft	17–18 March 2012	4
2012–13	Grand Prix	Minneapolis	Standard	19–20 May 2012	6
2012–13	Grand Prix	San Jose, Costa Rica	Sealed and Booster Draft	15–16 September 2012	5
2012–13	Grand Prix	Chicago	Modern	10–11 November 2012	2
2012–13	Grand Prix	Atlantic City	Standard	12–13 January 2013	2
2012–13	Pro Tour	San Diego	Block Constructed and Booster Draft	17–19 May 2013	4
2013–14	Worlds	Amsterdam	Special	31 July–4 August 2013	4
2013–14	Pro Tour	Atlanta	Block Constructed and Booster Draft	16–18 May 2014	3
2014–15	Grand Prix	Baltimore	Sealed and Booster Draft	13–14 December 2014	8
2016–17	Grand Prix	Vancouver	Modern	17–19 February 2017	1
2016-17	MOCS	Seattle	Standard and Booster Draft	3–5 March 2017	1
2017-18	Pro Tour	Minneapolis	Special	3–5 August 2018	2

Last updated: 06 August 2018

Other accomplishments

- Pro Tour Player of the Year 2013

Preceded by Charles Gindy	Magic US National Champion; 2010	Succeeded by Ali Aintrazi
Preceded by (Japan) Yuuya Watanabe	Pro Player of the Year; 2012–13	Succeeded by (France) Jérémy Dezani
Preceded by Brian Kibler	Magic US National Champion; 2013	Succeeded by Owen Turtenwald
