= Magic: The Gathering Pro Tour season 2012–13 =

2012–13 Pro Tour season
- Pro Player of the Year: (United States) Josh Utter-Leyton
- Rookie of the Year: (Chile) Felipe Tapia Becerra
- World Champion: (Japan) Yuuya Watanabe
- Pro Tours: 3
- Grands Prix: 44
- Hall of Fame inductions: (Brazil) Paulo Vitor Damo da Rosa (Japan) Kenji Tsumura (Japan) Masashi Oiso (United States) Patrick Chapin
- Start of season: 19 May 2012
- End of season: 19 May 2013

The 2012–13 Pro Tour season was the eighteenth season of the Magic: The Gathering Pro Tour. It started on 19 May 2012 with Grand Prix Malmö, and ended on 19 May 2013 with the conclusion of Pro Tour Dragon's Maze in San Diego. The season consisted of 44 Grand Prix and three Pro Tours, which were held in Seattle, Montreal and San Diego. At the end of the season Josh Utter-Leyton was proclaimed Pro Player of the Year.

== Grand Prix: Malmö, Minneapolis, Anaheim, Manila, Yokohama, Vancouver, Atlanta, São Paulo, Ghent, Columbus, Shanghai ==
GP Malmö (19–20 May 2012)

- Format: Limited
- Attendance: 922
1. (Italy) Matteo Versari
2. (Sweden) Oscar Almgren
3. (Denmark) Søren Larsen
4. (Spain) Pere Llimos Muntal
5. (Germany) Jasper Grimmer
6. (Sweden) Jon Westberg
7. (Italy) Samuele Estratti
8. (Sweden) David Hylander

GP Manila (16–17 June 2012)

- Format: Standard
- Attendance: 1108
1. (Japan) Yuuya Watanabe
2. (Malaysia) Rick Lee
3. (Japan) Hironobu Sugaya
4. (Philippines) Richmond Tan
5. (Philippines) Jonathan Luces
6. (Czech Republic) Martin Juza
7. (Singapore) Weng Heng Soh
8. (Philippines) Jacklord Nerez

GP Atlanta (30 June–1 July 2012)

- Format: Legacy
- Attendance: 905
1. (Lithuania) Gaudenis Vidugiris
2. (United States) Michael Majors
3. (United States) Daryl Ayers
4. (United States) Fred Edelkamp
5. (United States) Ben Stark
6. (United States) Sawyer Lucy
7. (Venezuela) Gerardo Fedon
8. (United States) Samuel Black

GP Columbus (21–22 July 2012)

- Format: Modern
- Attendance: 1046
1. (United States) Jacob Maynard
2. (Canada) Lucas Siow
3. (United States) Max Tietze
4. (United States) Aaron Estrin
5. (Israel) Shahar Shenhar
6. (United States) Chris Piland
7. (United States) Orrin Beasley
8. (United States) Caleb Estrada

GP Minneapolis (19–20 May 2012)

- Format: Standard
- Attendance: 1052
1. (United States) Christian Calcano
2. (United States) Brad Nelson
3. (United States) Rick Stout
4. (Canada) Stephen Bishop
5. (United States) Taylor Laehn
6. (United States) Josh Utter-Leyton
7. (United States) Ben Friedman
8. (United States) Jerret Schultz

GP Yokohoma (23–24 June 2012)

- Format: Modern
- Attendance: 1523
1. (Japan) Jyun'ichi Miyajima
2. (Japan) Kei Umehara
3. (Japan) Satoshi Yamaguchi
4. (Japan) Toshiyuki Kadooka
5. (Japan) Hiroya Miyamoto
6. (Japan) Yuki Yotsumoto
7. (Japan) Youichi Nagami
8. (Japan) Masaki Ushijima

GP São Paulo (21–22 July 2012)

- Format: Limited
- Attendance: 738
1. (Brazil) Reinaldo Gomes da Silva Jr.
2. (Brazil) Rodrigo Gonçalves dos Santos
3. (Brazil) Thiago Oliveira
4. (Brazil) José Francisco Dantas Mangueira da Silva
5. (Brazil) Luiz Henrique Martine de Lima
6. (Argentina) Guido Quintana
7. (Brazil) Rafael Mendonca
8. (Venezuela) Daniel Fior

GP Shanghai (28–29 July 2012)

- Format: Limited
- Attendance: 836
1. (China) Bo Li
2. (China) Fengwen Gu
3. (China) Nan Wu
4. (Japan) Rei Satou
5. (China) Yang Wang
6. (Singapore) Nicholas Jonathan Wong
7. (New Zealand) Xiang Xue Song
8. (Japan) Toshiya Kanegawa

GP Anaheim (26–27 May 2012)

- Format: Block Constructed
- Attendance: 938
1. (United States) Marc Lalague
2. (United States) Paul Rietzl
3. (United States) Noah Koessel
4. (United States) Eric Froehlich
5. (United States) Michael Hopkins
6. (United States) Brian Kibler
7. (United States) John Sittner
8. (United States) Jason Rosellini

GP Vancouver (23–24 June 2012)

- Format: Limited
- Attendance: 849
1. (United States) David Stroud
2. (Canada) Jeremey Schofield
3. (Canada) Steven Riecken
4. (Republic of Ireland) Marcin Sciesinski
5. (Canada) Colin Miller
6. (United States) Brian Wong
7. (Canada) Sean Peterson
8. (United States) Morgan Chang

GP Ghent (21–22 July 2012)

- Format: Legacy
- Attendance: 1345
1. (Germany) Timo Schünemann
2. (Germany) Lukas Maurer
3. (Italy) Emanuele Marcotti
4. (Sweden) Elias Watsfeldt
5. (Finland) Max Sjoblom
6. (Austria) Elias Klocker
7. (Italy) Andreas Milillo
8. (France) Tristan Polzl

== World Magic Cup ==
Indianapolis (16–19 August 2012)

- Prize pool: $136,000
- Format: Standard, Booster Draft, Team Constructed, Team Limited
- Attendance: 283 players representing 71 countries/regions

=== Top 8 ===
Quarter-finals
1	Croatia	1
8	Puerto Rico	2
4	Poland	2
5	Philippines	1
2	Scotland	1
7	Hungary	2
3	Chinese Taipei	2
6	Slovak Republic	1

Semi-finals
Puerto Rico	2
Poland	0
Hungary	0
Chinese Taipei	2

Finals
Puerto Rico	0
Chinese Taipei	2

=== Final standings ===
Place	Country	Player	Prize	Pro Points
1	(Taiwan) Chinese Taipei	Kuo Tzu-Ching	$10,000	8
1	(Taiwan) Chinese Taipei	Tung-Yi Cheng	$10,000	8
1	(Taiwan) Chinese Taipei	Yu Min Yang	$10,000	8
1	(Taiwan) Chinese Taipei	Paul Renie	$10,000	8
2	Puerto Rico	Jorge Iramain	$5,000	7
2	Puerto Rico	Gabriel Nieves	$5,000	7
2	Puerto Rico	Cesar Soto	$5,000	7
2	Puerto Rico	Jonathan Paez	$5,000	7
3	Poland	Tomek Pedrakowski	$2,500	6
3	Poland	Mateusz Kopec	$2,500	6
3	Poland	Adam Bubacz	$2,500	6
3	Poland	Jan Pruchniewicz	$2,500	6
4	Hungary	Tamás Glied	$2,500	6
4	Hungary	Gabor Kocsis	$2,500	6
4	Hungary	Tamas Nagy	$2,500	6
4	Hungary	Máté Schrick	$2,500	6

Place	Country	Player	Prize	Pro Points
5	Croatia	Grgur Petric Maretic	$1,500	5
5	Croatia	Toni Portolan	$1,500	5
5	Croatia	Stjepan Sučić	$1,500	5
5	Croatia	Goran Elez	$1,500	5
6	Scotland	Stephen Murray	$1,500	5
6	Scotland	Bradley Barclay	$1,500	5
6	Scotland	Andrew Morrison	$1,500	5
6	Scotland	Chris Davie	$1,500	5
7	Philippines	Andrew Cantillana	$1,500	5
7	Philippines	Gerald Camangon	$1,500	5
7	Philippines	Zax Ozaki	$1,500	5
7	Philippines	Jeremy Bryan Domocmat	$1,500	5
8	Slovakia	Robert Jurkovic	$1,500	5
8	Slovakia	Ivan Floch	$1,500	5
8	Slovakia	Filip Valis	$1,500	5
8	Slovakia	Patrik Surab	$1,500	5

== Grand Prix: Boston ==
GP Boston (25–26 August 2012)

- Format: Limited
- Attendance: 1845
1. (United States) Brian Demars
2. (United States) Robert Victory
3. (United States) Cedric Phillips
4. (United States) Alex Lloyd
5. (United States) Kevin Michael
6. (United States) Jason Ford
7. (Austria) Thomas Holzinger
8. (Japan) Shouta Yasooka

== 2012 Magic Players Championship ==
Seattle (29–31 August 2012)

- Prize pool: $108,000
- Format: Modern, Cube Draft, Booster Draft
- Attendance: 16

=== Top 4 playoff ===
Semifinals
Shouta Yasooka	3
Jon Finkel	0
Paulo Vitor Damo da Rosa	1
Yuuya Watanabe	3

Finals
Shouta Yasooka	2
Yuuya Watanabe	3

=== Final standings ===
The following sixteen players received an invitation to the 2012 Players Championship due to their performance in the 2012 season. They are ordered according to the final standings of the event.

#	Player	Prize	Pro points	Qualified due to
1	(Japan) Yuuya Watanabe	$40,000	11	Pro Point leader Japan
2	(Japan) Shouta Yasooka	$20,000	13	3rd most Pro Points of otherwise unqualified
3	(Brazil) Paulo Vitor Damo da Rosa	$10,000	7	Pro Point leader South America
4	(United States) Jon Finkel	$10,000	7	Most Pro Points of otherwise unqualified
5	(Japan) Shuhei Nakamura	$5,000	7	5th most Pro Points of otherwise unqualified
6	(United States) Brian Kibler	$5,000	6	Pro Tour Dark Ascension winner
7	(Italy) Samuele Estratti	$5,000	6	Pro Tour Philadelphia winner
8	(Canada) Alexander Hayne	$5,000	6	Pro Tour Avacyn Restored winner
9	(Czech Republic) Martin Juza	$1,000	6	Pro Point leader Europe
10	(United States) Owen Turtenwald	$1,000	6	2011 Player of the year
11	(Japan) Jun'ya Iyanaga	$1,000	6	2011 World Champion
12	(United States) Luis Scott-Vargas	$1,000	5	2nd most Pro Points of otherwise unqualified
13	(United States) Josh Utter-Leyton	$1,000	5	Pro Point leader North America
14	(United States) David Ochoa	$1,000	5	4th most Pro Points of otherwise unqualified
15	(Taiwan) Kuo Tzu-Ching	$1,000	4	Pro Point leader APAC region
16	(United States) Reid Duke	$1,000	2	2011 Magic Online Champion

== Grand Prix: San Jose (Costa Rica), Moscow, San Jose (USA) ==
GP San Jose, Costa Rica (15–16 September 2012)

- Format: Limited
- Attendance: 364
1. (Japan) Shuhei Nakamura
2. (United States) David Sharfman
3. (United States) Ben Stark
4. (Brazil) Willy Edel
5. (United States) Josh Utter-Leyton
6. (United States) David Ochoa
7. (United States) A.J. Sacher
8. (Canada) Pascal Maynard

GP Moscow (15–16 September 2012)

- Format: Limited
- Attendance: 869
1. (Italy) Luca Casadei
2. (Germany) Wenzel Krautmann
3. (Russia) Petr Kuznetsov
4. (Russia) Roman Masaladzhiu
5. (Russia) Anatoly Chuhwichev
6. (Estonia) Hannes Kerem
7. (Ukraine) Konstantin Yarosh
8. (Russia) Dmitriy Tolkatchov

GP San Jose, USA (13–14 October 2012)

- Format: Team limited
- Attendance: 1713 (571 teams)

1.

(United States) Matthew Sperling
(United States) David Williams
(United States) Paul Rietzl

2.

(Canada) Maksym Gryn
(Canada) Lucas Siow
(Canada) Jamie Naylor

3.

(United States) Conley Woods
(United States) Eric Froehlich
(United States) Owen Turtenwald

4.

(Slovakia) Ivan Floch
(Czech Republic) Lukas Jaklovsky
(Czech Republic) Stanislav Cifka

== Pro Tour Return to Ravnica ==
Seattle (19–21 October 2012)

- Prize pool: $233,500
- Format: Modern, Booster Draft
- Attendance: 383

Pro Tour Return to Ravnica was the first major Modern event with Return to Ravnica in the format. It was also the first major tournament in which Valakut, the Molten Pinnacle was legal in Modern after being unbanned in the Modern format shortly before.

=== Top 8 ===
Quarter-finals
1	Stanislav Cifka	3
8	Pedro Carvalho	1
4	Lee Shi Tian	3
5	Eduardo Sajgalik	2
2	David Ochoa	3
7	Willy Edel	2
3	Kelvin Chew	2
6	Yuuya Watanabe	3

Semi-finals
Stanislav Cifka	3
Lee Shi Tian	1
David Ochoa	2
Yuuya Watanabe	3

Finals
Stanislav Cifka	3
Yuuya Watanabe	2

=== Final standings ===
Place	Player	Prize	Pro Points	Comment
1	(Czech Republic) Stanislav Cifka	$40,000	30	
2	(Japan) Yuuya Watanabe	$20,000	24	2nd final day
3	(United States) David Ochoa	$12,500	22	
4	(Hong Kong) Lee Shi Tian	$12,500	22	1st Hong Konger in a Top 8
5	(Singapore) Kelvin Chew	$10,000	20	
6	(England) Eduardo Sajgalik	$10,000	20	
7	(Brazil) Willy Edel	$10,000	20	4th final day
8	(Brazil) Pedro Carvalho	$10,000	20	

== Grand Prix: Philadelphia, Lyon, Auckland, Chicago, Bochum, Charleston, Taipei, San Antonio, Lisbon, Toronto, Nagoya, Indianapolis, Denver, Atlantic City, Singapore, Bilbao, Sydney, London ==
GP Philadelphia (27–28 October 2012)

- Format: Limited
- Attendance: 1986
1. (Japan) Shuhei Nakamura
2. (Czech Republic) Lukas Jaklovsky
3. (Czech Republic) Martin Juza
4. (United States) Greg Smith
5. (United States) Jake Gans
6. (United States) Harry Corvese
7. (United States) Luis Scott-Vargas
8. (Japan) Yuuya Watanabe

GP Chicago (10–11 November 2012)

- Format: Modern
- Attendance: 1113
1. (United States) Jacob Wilson
2. (United States) Josh Utter-Leyton
3. (United States) Alex Majlaton
4. (United States) Edgar Flores
5. (United States) Shane McDermott
6. (United States) Ryan Hovis
7. (United States) David Gleicher
8. (United States) Michael Simon

GP Taipei (24–25 November 2012)

- Format: Limited
- Attendance: 727
1. (Japan) Makihito Mihara
2. (Japan) Akimasa Yamamoto
3. (Singapore) Weng Heng Soh
4. (Japan) Motoki Abe
5. (Hong Kong) Derek Tsang
6. (Japan) Yuuya Watanabe
7. (Japan) Toshiaki Murata
8. (Hong Kong) Lee Shi Tian

GP Toronto (8–9 December 2012)

- Format: Modern
- Attendance: 1051
1. (Brazil) Willy Edel
2. (United States) Sam Pardee
3. (Canada) Alon Chitiz
4. (United States) Alex Majlaton
5. (Canada) James Vance
6. (Canada) Collin Morton
7. (Canada) Jon Stern
8. (United States) Dan Jordan

GP Denver (5–6 January 2013)

- Format: Legacy
- Attendance: 700
1. (Indonesia) Vidianto Wijaya
2. (United States) Pat Cox
3. (United States) Ryan Pesch
4. (United States) Joshua Ravitz
5. (United States) Matt Nass
6. (United States) Daniel Signorini
7. (United States) Andrew Ohlschwager
8. (United States) Donnie Peck

GP Bilbao (19–20 January 2013)

- Format: Modern
- Attendance: 988
1. (Netherlands) Mitchell Manders
2. (Czech Republic) Lukas Jaklovsky
3. (France) Louis Deltour
4. (Portugal) Vasco Bonifacio
5. (Italy) Lorenzo Calzolari
6. (Spain) Martin Scheinin
7. (France) Mathieu Deloly
8. (Spain) Francisco Camacho

GP Lyon (3–4 November 2012)

- Format: Modern
- Attendance: 1326
1. (France) Jérémy Dezani
2. (Germany) Emanuel Sutor
3. (France) Mathieu Hautot
4. (Italy) Davide Colla
5. (England) Peter Dun
6. (France) Olivier Ruel
7. (France) Clement Sarton
8. (Germany) Jonas Köstler

GP Bochum (17–18 November 2012)

- Format: Standard
- Attendance: 1723
1. (Czech Republic) Martin Juza
2. (Germany) Fabian Dickmann
3. (Czech Republic) Tomas Vanek
4. (Poland) Kamil Napierski
5. (Netherlands) Enrico Van Eijsden
6. (France) Pierre Dagen
7. (Germany) Lukas Tajak
8. (Germany) Sascha Stein

GP San Antonio (24–25 November 2012)

- Format: Standard
- Attendance: 807
1. (United States) Tyler Lytle
2. (United States) Matthew Pratser
3. (United States) Conley Woods
4. (United States) Reid Duke
5. (United States) Harry Corvese
6. (United States) Ben Rasmussen
7. (Mexico) Joel De Santos Jasso
8. (United States) Matthew Thurber

GP Nagoya (8–9 December 2012)

- Format: Standard
- Attendance: 1689
1. (Japan) Yuuji Okita
2. (Indonesia) Rahman Aryabhima
3. (Japan) Mamoru Nagai
4. (Japan) Ryuji Murae
5. (Japan) Kyouhei Kawaguchi
6. (Japan) Kenji Tsumura
7. (Japan) Kazumasa Satou
8. (Japan) Kazuaki Shinohara

GP Atlantic City (12–13 January 2013)

- Format: Standard
- Attendance: 1648
1. (Canada) Jon Stern
2. (United States) Josh Utter-Leyton
3. (United States) Brad Nelson
4. (United States) Ari Lax
5. (United States) Matt Costa
6. (United States) Ryan Leverone
7. (United States) Lloyd Kurth
8. (United States) Seneca Hobler

GP Sydney (19–20 January 2013)

- Format: Limited
- Attendance: 686
1. (Australia) Allen Zhang
2. (Australia) Justin Cheung
3. (Japan) Tomoharu Saito
4. (New Zealand) Zen Takahashi
5. (Australia) Daniel Unwin
6. (Czech Republic) Martin Juza
7. (Czech Republic) Stanislav Cifka
8. (Australia) Adam Witton

GP Auckland (3–4 November 2012)

- Format: Standard
- Attendance: 264
1. (New Zealand) Walker MacMurdo
2. (Australia) Adam Witton
3. (Japan) Yoshitoki Sakai
4. (Australia) Dylan Brown
5. (Australia) Justin Cheung
6. (New Zealand) John Denz
7. (Australia) Robert Liu
8. (Australia) Anthony Purdom

GP Charleston (17–18 November 2012)

- Format: Standard
- Attendance: 661
1. (United States) Jon Bolding
2. (United States) Brian Eason
3. (United States) Matt Keene
4. (United States) Peter Kelly
5. (United States) Reid Duke
6. (United States) Pat Cox
7. (United States) Gerry Thompson
8. (United States) Morgan Chang

GP Lisbon (1–2 December 2012)

- Format: Limited
- Attendance: 1340
1. (Slovakia) Ivan Floch
2. (Sweden) Elias Watsfeldt
3. (Norway) Sveinung Bjørnerud
4. (Belgium) Johan Verhulst
5. (Denmark) Lasse Nørgaard
6. (Sweden) David Calås
7. (Portugal) Helder Coelho
8. (Portugal) Pedro Carvalho

GP Indianapolis (22–23 December 2012)

- Format: Limited
- Attendance: 817
1. (United States) Ben Stark
2. (United States) Chris Fennell
3. (United States) Luis Scott-Vargas
4. (United States) Brian Demars
5. (United States) Matthias Hunt
6. (United States) Adam Yurchick
7. (United States) Tom Martell
8. (United States) Tyler Lytle

GP Singapore (12–13 January 2013)

- Format: Limited
- Attendance: 894
1. (Japan) Ken Yukuhiro
2. (Singapore) Chapman Sim
3. (Philippines) Andrew Cantillana
4. (Singapore) Lin Rui Zi
5. (Japan) Jun'ya Nakamura
6. (Japan) Toshiya Kanegawa
7. (China) Gao Zhen Xing
8. (Taiwan) Huang Hao-Shan

GP London (9–10 February 2013)

- Format: Limited
- Attendance: 1970
1. (France) Timothée Simonot
2. (England) Bartłomiej Tomiczek
3. (Germany) Manuel Hauck
4. (Austria) David Reitbauer
5. (Norway) Andreas Nordahl
6. (Sweden) Per Carlsson
7. (Venezuela) Fabrizio Anteri
8. (England) Jamie Ross

== Pro Tour Gatecrash ==
Montreal (15–17 February 2013)

- Prize pool: $250,000
- Format: Standard, Booster Draft
- Attendance: 329

=== Top 8 ===
Quarter-finals
1	Ben Stark	3
8	Stephen Mann	1
4	Joel Larsson	3
5	Gerry Thompson	1
2	Owen Turtenwald	1
7	Eric Froehlich	3
3	Melissa DeTora	1
6	Tom Martell	3

Semi-finals
Ben Stark	2
Joel Larsson	3
Eric Froehlich	2
Tom Martell	3

Finals
Joel Larsson	1
Tom Martell	3

=== Final standings ===
Place	Player	Prize	Pro Points	Comment
1	(United States) Tom Martell	$40,000	30	2nd final day
2	(Sweden) Joel Larsson	$20,000	24	
3	(United States) Ben Stark	$12,500	22	4th final day
4	(United States) Eric Froehlich	$12,500	22	3rd final day
5	(United States) Owen Turtenwald	$10,000	20	
6	(United States) Melissa DeTora	$10,000	20	1st woman in a Top 8
7	(United States) Gerry Thompson	$10,000	20	
8	(United States) Stephen Mann	$10,000	20	

== Grand Prix: Quebec City, Charlotte, Yokohama, Verona, Rio de Janeiro, San Diego, Utrecht, Pittsburgh, Strasbourg, Portland, Beijing ==
GP Quebec City (23–24 February 2013)

- Format: Standard
- Attendance: 806
1. (United States) Nico Christiansen
2. (Taiwan) Kuo Tzu-Ching
3. (Chile) Felipe Tapia Becerra
4. (United States) Reid Duke
5. (Austria) Thomas Holzinger
6. (Canada) Wilson Wong
7. (Canada) Maxime Cantin
8. (Germany) Wenzel Krautmann

GP Verona (9–10 March 2013)

- Format: Standard
- Attendance: 1208
1. (Ukraine) Mike Krasnitski
2. (Denmark) Andreas Nilsson
3. (France) Jérémy Dezani
4. (Italy) Samuele Estratti
5. (Spain) Toni Ramis Pascual
6. (Poland) Piotr Wald
7. (Israel) Shahar Shenhar
8. (Germany) Max Schultze

GP Utrecht (16–17 March 2013)

- Format: Team Limited
- Attendance: 2031 (677 teams)

1.

(Sweden) Fredrik Carlsson
(Sweden) Jonathan Bergström
(Sweden) Tomas Westling

2.

(Sweden) Joel Larsson
(Sweden) Elias Watsfeldt
(Sweden) Mikael Magnusson

3.

(Germany) René Kraft
(Germany) Tobias Radloff
(Germany) Martin Zimmermann

4.

(Italy) Matteo Versari
(Italy) Alessandro Lippi
(Italy) Samuele Estratti

GP Charlotte (23–24 February 2013)

- Format: Limited
- Attendance: 2693
1. (United States) Frank Skarren
2. (United States) Gerard Fabiano
3. (United States) Patrick Sullivan
4. (United States) Aaron Lewis
5. (United States) Richard Nguyen
6. (United States) Ben Isgur
7. (United States) Ben Stark
8. (United States) Antonino Baldasari

GP Rio de Janeiro (9–10 March 2013)

- Format: Standard
- Attendance: 709
1. (Brazil) José Francisco Dantas Mangueira da Silva
2. (Brazil) Arthur Villela
3. (Argentina) Andrés Monsalve
4. (Brazil) Walter Coquemala Filho
5. (Brazil) Wellington Cordeiro
6. (Argentina) Martín Quiroga
7. (Brazil) Jorge Henrique Siqueira
8. (Brazil) Matías Arvigo

GP Pittsburgh (23–24 March 2013)

- Format: Limited
- Attendance: 1628
1. (United States) Brock Parker
2. (United States) Alec Nezin
3. (United States) Gabby Izsak
4. (United States) Eric Froehlich
5. (United States) Matthew Falcioni
6. (United States) Adam Carrasco
7. (United States) Michael Derczo
8. (United States) Chase Kovac

GP Beijing (11–12 May 2013)

- Format: Limited
- Attendance: 894
1. (China) Quan Zhou
2. (Thailand) Nonthakorn Kositaporn
3. (Japan) Toshiya Kanegawa
4. (Singapore) Wei Quan Wong
5. (Wales) Daniel Godfrey
6. (China) Shuo Li
7. (China) Nandi Zhang
8. (China) Bo Li

GP Yokohama (2–3 March 2013)

- Format: Limited
- Attendance: 2297
1. (Japan) Masaya Kitayama
2. (Japan) Tian Yu Zhao
3. (United States) Samuel Black
4. (Japan) Makihito Mihara
5. (Japan) Yasutaka Hibino
6. (Japan) Shintarou Ishimura
7. (Japan) Tomomi Shiraishi
8. (Japan) Tomoya Motomura

GP San Diego (16–17 March 2013)

- Format: Modern
- Attendance: 759
1. (United States) Nathan Holiday
2. (United States) Sammy Tuckeman
3. (United States) Eric Froehlich
4. (United States) David Sharfman
5. (United States) Bryan De La Torre
6. (United States) Brian Kibler
7. (Japan) Ken Yukuhiro
8. (United States) Matt Ferrando

GP Strasbourg (13–14 April 2013)

- Format: Legacy
- Attendance: 1364
1. (Denmark) Thomas Enevoldsen
2. (United States) Jacob Wilson
3. (Canada) Alexander Hayne
4. (Denmark) Michael Bonde
5. (Russia) Alexey Romanchuk
6. (Germany) Hove Thießen
7. (Germany) Christopher Brunner
8. (Germany) Fabian Görzgen

GP Portland (11–12 May 2013)

- Format: Modern
- Attendance: 979
1. (United States) Sam Pardee
2. (United States) Joe Demestrio
3. (United States) Zvi Mowshowitz
4. (Canada) Dan MacDonald
5. (Italy) Mattia Rizzi
6. (United States) Orie Guo
7. (United States) Matt Nass
8. (United States) Paul Rietzl

== Pro Tour Dragon's Maze ==
San Diego (17–19 May 2013)

- Prize pool: $250,000
- Format: Block Constructed, Booster Draft
- Attendance: 388

=== Top 8 ===
Quarter-finals
1	Craig Wescoe	3
8	Andrejs Prost	2
4	Andrew Shrout	1
5	Josh Utter-Leyton	3
2	Rob Castellon	2
7	Dustin Ochoa	3
3	Makihito Mihara	3
6	Matej Zatlkaj	2

Semi-finals
Craig Wescoe	3
Josh Utter-Leyton	1
Dustin Ochoa	3
Makihito Mihara	2

Finals
Craig Wescoe	3
Dustin Ochoa	0

=== Final standings ===
Place	Player	Prize	Pro Points	Comment
1	(United States) Craig Wescoe	$40,000	30	3rd final day
2	(United States) Dustin Ochoa	$20,000	24	
3	(Japan) Makihito Mihara	$12,500	22	4th final day
4	(United States) Josh Utter-Leyton	$12,500	22	4th final day
5	(United States) Rob Castellon	$10,000	20	Pro Tour debut
6	(United States) Andrew Shrout	$10,000	20	Pro Tour debut
7	(Slovakia) Matej Zatlkaj	$10,000	20	2nd final day
8	(Latvia) Andrejs Prost	$10,000	20	2nd final day

== Invitees to the 2013 World Championship ==
The following sixteen players received an invitation to the 2013 World Championship due to their performance in the 2012–13 season.

Player	Qualification seat
(United States) Josh Utter-Leyton	2012–13 Player of the Year
(Japan) Yuuya Watanabe	2012 Players’ Championship winner
(Russia) Dimitriy Butakov	2012 Magic Online champion
(Czech Republic) Stanislav Cifka	Pro Tour Return to Ravnica champion
(United States) Tom Martell	Pro Tour Gatecrash champion
(United States) Craig Wescoe	Pro Tour Dragon's Maze champion
(Brazil) Willy Edel	Pro Points leader, Latin America
(Hong Kong) Lee Shi Tian	Pro Points leader, Asia-Pacific
(United States) Eric Froehlich	At-large seat #1
(United States) Ben Stark	At-large seat #2
(Japan) Shuhei Nakamura	At-large seat #3
(United States) Brian Kibler	At-large seat #4
(Israel) Shahar Shenhar	At-large seat #5
(Czech Republic) Martin Jůza	At-large seat #6
(United States) David Ochoa	At-large seat #7
(United States) Reid Duke	At-large seat #8

== Pro Player of the Year final standings ==
After Pro Tour Dragon's Maze Josh Utter-Leyton was awarded the Pro Player of the year title.

Rank	Player	Pro Points
1	(United States) Josh Utter-Leyton	77
2	(United States) Tom Martell	67
3	(United States) Eric Froehlich	65
3	(Japan) Yuuya Watanabe	65
5	(United States) Ben Stark	61
