= Magic: The Gathering Players Tour =

Competitive collectible card game league

The Players Tour (PT) is a competitive international league for the Magic: The Gathering collectible card game, culminating in the World Championship. It consists of a series of tournaments held throughout the world, each requiring an invitation to participate. The Players Tour permanently replaced the Pro Tour in the 2020 season. Every PT awards a total of $250,000 in cash prizes, with $50,000 going to the winner. The Players Tour is split into three regions: Americas, Europe, and Asia-Pacific. Each region hosts three events, resulting in nine Players Tour events per season.

== History ==
The first major Magic: The Gathering tournament was the 1994 World Championship held at Gen Con '94. It was a single-elimination 512-person Constructed event run over three days of competition. The winner, Zak Dolan, received a trophy, a number of booster packs from expansions ranging from Arabian Nights to Ice Age, a deck of Magic: The Gathering poker cards, and a T-shirt. Another World Championship was organized in 1995.

In 1995, Brand Manager Skaff Elias suggested that organized play needed to be expanded. He worked to create a yearly tournament structure to allow players a chance to compete for cash prizes.

=== Pro Tour ===
The Pro Tour debuted in 1996 under the name The Black Lotus Pro Tour, featuring events only in the United States. A tournament was held in New York on February 16–18, 1996. The series included three more Pro Tour events, culminating in the final Pro Tour, the World Championship, held in Seattle. After this first season, Pro Tour events began to be held in Europe and Asia.

In the following years Pro Tour seasons (one year each from August to August the next year) always consisted of five and later six Pro Tours. From 2003 to 2005 Wizards of the Coast made an effort to bring the Pro Tour seasons in accordance with the calendar year. This resulted in the '03-'04 and '04-'05 seasons being composed of seven Pro Tour events. The 2006 and subsequent Pro Tour seasons were reduced to five and later four Pro Tours per year. In 2012, the season schedule was again adjusted, now starting and ending in May. Additionally, the World Championship lost its status as a Pro Tour event, resulting in three Pro Tours to be held each season. In 2014, the amount of Pro Tours went back up to four a season.

Cash prize pools gradually increased from around $150,000 per tournament in 1996–97 to $250,000 in 2012. In the first Pro Tour season each Pro Tour event awarded more prizes than the previous one. Afterwards prize payouts had only minor fluctuations throughout a season with the exception of the World Championships, where additional prizes are awarded.

Pro Tours started as single-format events in 1996, alternating between Constructed and Limited, with the exception of the World Championships which have been multi-format events since the inception of the Pro Tour. In 2010 Pro Tours were changed to always have several rounds of Constructed and Limited play.

=== Pro Points and Pro Club ===
MTG Pro Tour players benefited from a point system that granted tiered awards called the Pro Club. Points were earned based on performance in the Pro Tour events. The tiers were Bronze, Silver, Gold, and Platinum, and provided players with bye-games in tournament play, automatic invitations to Pro Tour events, and complimentary travel expenses to the tournaments. Platinum level players received cash bonuses for participating in tournaments and were given custom Players cards. This program ended on December 22, 2019.

=== Transition to Players Tour ===
In December 2018 Wizards of the Coast announced that the Pro Tours would be renamed to Mythic Championship in 2019. This was done in an effort to include the digital MTG Arena in the competitive scene. Tabletop and online MTG had individual versions of Mythic Championship, and the prize pool was increased to $500,000 per event. Along with this restructure, a "Magic Pro League" (MPL) was created. The Mythic Championship was intended to feed players into the MPL. This system was discontinued after the 2019 season.

Beginning in 2020, the tabletop Mythic Championships were replaced by a new regional system called the Players Tour. This effectively makes the Players Tour the successor to what was once the tabletop Pro Tour.

== Qualification ==
There are approximately 3600 invitations to compete in the Players Tours, and there are many ways to qualify. The most common are:

- Qualifying for the Finals in the previous season.
- Placing highly at Qualifier-level events
- Reaching a Top 8 ranking or having at least 39 match points in individual format Grand Prix; or reaching the Top 4 or having at least 36 match points in team format Grand Prix

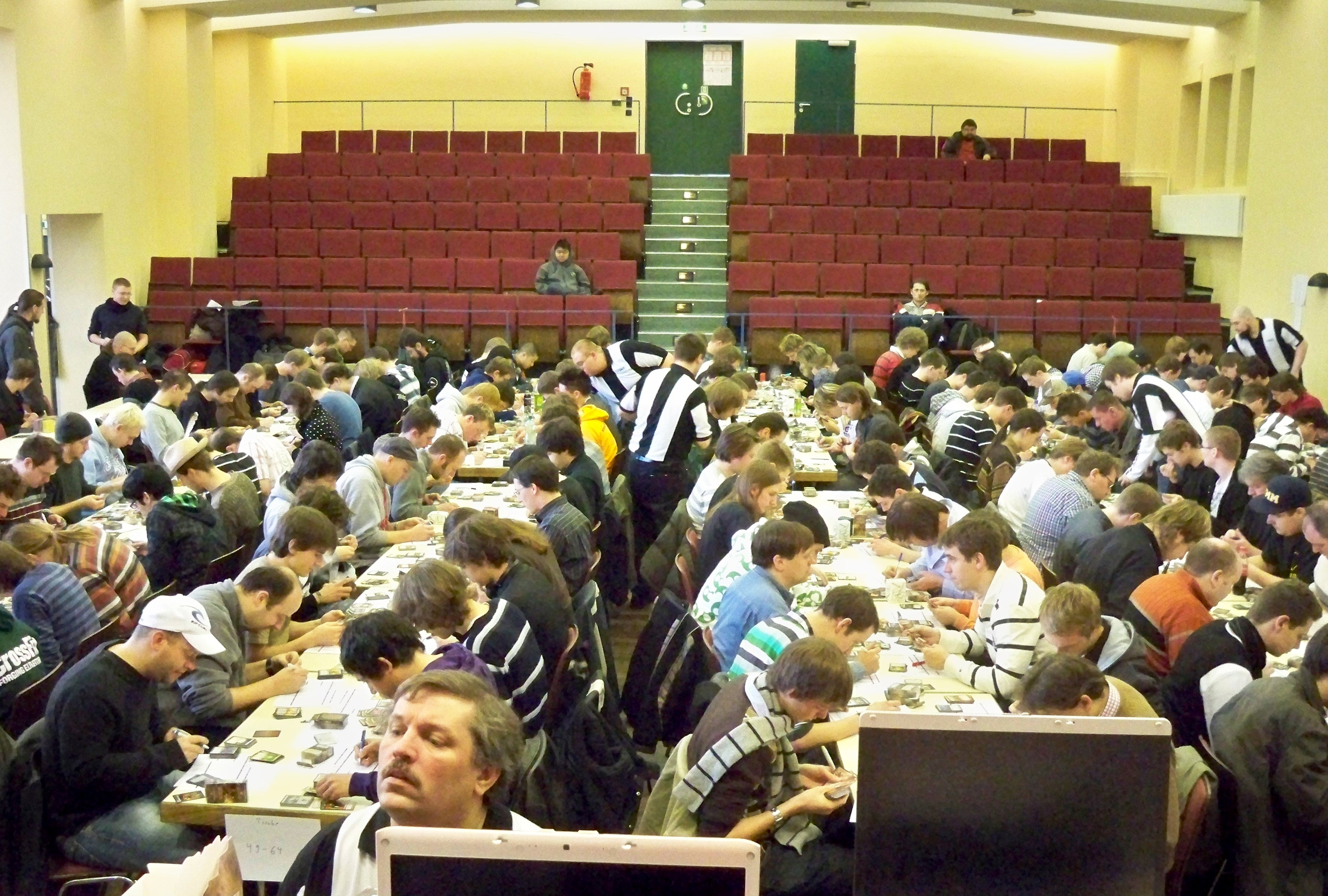
A Pro Tour Qualifier Event in Frankfurt, 2008

In 2012 it was announced that Sponsor's Exemption invitations would be given regularly to players who "showed excellence in play and positive community activity during the qualifying season." Previously, invitations to those who did not meet qualification criteria were given out very rarely.

== Current Play Format ==
Players Tour events consist of one constructed and one limited format. Constructed Players Tours utilize either Block Constructed, Standard, or Extended (succeeded by Modern in 2011 season), while Limited Players Tours usually employ the Booster Draft format. Rochester Draft can be used for Limited play, but due to time constraints rarely is.

World Championships feature multiple formats, which usually include standard with a constructed format, and a limited format (either Booster Draft or Rochester Draft).

== Tournament structure ==
All Players Tours are run using a modified Swiss-system. Typical events are held over three days with 7 rounds (Limited) or 8 rounds (Constructed or Mixed) of Swiss the first day. Players with fewer than 4 victories (Limited or Mixed) or 5 victories (Constructed) after day 1 were eliminated. 8 more rounds of Swiss followed on the second day after which the eight best finishing players constitute what is called the Top 8. On the third and final day, the Top 8 players play single-elimination until the winner is determined. Starting with the 2009 season this system is modified to accompany the fact that each PT utilizes constructed and limited formats, in which three rounds of a booster draft will be held followed by five rounds of constructed.

== Payout ==
The payout of the Players Tour is based on ranking at the conclusion of a tournament. Currently the prize pool amounts to $250,000 for each Players Tour event. The payout extends down to 64th place with the current payout structure being:

Place	Individual
1	$50,000
2	$20,000
3–4	$15,000
5–6	$10,000
7–16	$5,000
17–24	$3,000
25–32	$2,000
33–48	$1,500
49–64	$1,000

== Lifetime Leaderboards ==
=== Top Finishes by Player ===
Players on this list have achieved the highest amount of placements in the Top 8 in official competitive play since the first Pro Tour in 1996. These statistics include Pro Tour Top 8s, Players Tour Top 8s, Players Tour Finals Top 8s, Mythic Championship Top 8s/Top 4s, Mythic Invitational Top 8s/Top 4s, World Championship Top 4s (2012-current), 2020 Season Grand Finals Top 8s, Set Championship Top 8s, Magic Online Championship Top 4s, Magic Online Champions Showcase Top 2s, and Arena Championship Top 8s. (For team events, a Top 4 team place is considered making a Top 8 for the individual team members.). Rankings are current as of July 23, 2026.

Rank	Player	Wins	Top 8
1	(United States) Jon Finkel	3	17
2	(Brazil) Paulo Vitor Damo da Rosa	3	16
2	(France) Gabriel Nassif	2	16
4	(Germany) Kai Budde	7	13
4	(United States) Seth Manfield	5	13
6	(Japan) Shouta Yasooka	2	12
7	(Portugal) Márcio Carvalho	0	11
7	(Spain) Javier Domínguez	3	11
7	(United States) Luis Scott-Vargas	1	11
10	(United States) Josh Utter-Leyton	1	9
10	(Japan) Ken Yukuhiro	1	9

=== Championship Wins by Country ===
The following table displays the amount of Pro and Players Tours won, broken down by country.

M:TG PT wins by country (updated as of PT Marvel)
Rank	Country	Wins
1	United States	61
2	Japan	21
3	Germany	16
4	France	9
5	Canada	7
6	Sweden	6
7	Brazil	5
8	Norway	4
8	Czech Republic	4
8	Netherlands	4
8	Great Britain	4
12	Finland	3
12	Spain	3
12	Denmark	3
15	Argentina	2
15	Italy	2
17	Australia	1
17	Belgium	1
17	Israel	1
17	Portugal	1
17	Slovakia	1
17	Poland	1

== Legacy ==
With the retirement of the Pro Point system in 2019, the Player and Rookie of the year award system is no longer utilized. Thus, these statistics are not available for the current Players Tour seasons.

=== Pro Player of the Year ===
The Pro Player of the Year title was awarded to the individual who has accumulated the most pro points over the course of a season (with the exception of 2012 season, which was awarded to the winner of the Magic Players Championship, a tournament that replaced that year's Magic: The Gathering World Championship. Previously, the Player of the Year received invitations to several high-level tournaments throughout the following year, as well as travel and other accommodations to each of the following season's Pro Tours (including the World Championship). Since the 2016–17 season, there is no additional benefit as a Player of the Year.

A tie in the Player of the Year standings resulted in a playoff to determine the winner. The first playoff was held in 2011 as a side event at Pro Tour Paris, deciding the 2010 Player of the Year race between Brad Nelson and Guillaume Matignon (both finished with 66 points in the 2010 season). In the best-of-7 single match playoff, Nelson won 4 games to 2 to achieve the title.

Season	Player of the Year
1996	(Sweden) Olle Råde
1996–97	(Canada) Paul McCabe
1997–98	(United States) Jon Finkel
1998–99	(Germany) Kai Budde
1999–00	(United States) Bob Maher, Jr.
2000–01	(Germany) Kai Budde
2001–02	(Germany) Kai Budde
2002–03	(Germany) Kai Budde
2003–04	(France) Gabriel Nassif
2005	(Japan) Kenji Tsumura
2006	(Japan) Shouta Yasooka
2007	(Japan) Tomoharu Saitou
2008	(Japan) Shuhei Nakamura
2009	(Japan) Yuuya Watanabe
2010	(United States) Brad Nelson
2011	(United States) Owen Turtenwald
2012	(Japan) Yuuya Watanabe
2012–13	(United States) Josh Utter-Leyton
2013–14	(France) Jérémy Dezani
2014–15	(United States) Mike Sigrist
2015–16	(United States) Owen Turtenwald
2016–17	(Brazil) Paulo Vitor Damo da Rosa
2017–18	(Argentina) Luis Salvatto
2018-22	Not Awarded
2022–23	(Spain) Javier Dominguez

=== Rookie of the Year ===
The Rookie of the Year title, introduced in the 1997–1998 season, was awarded to the player who accumulated the most pro points over the course of a season and did not participate in a Pro Tour, World Championship, or World Magic Cup prior to that season.

Season	Rookie of the Year
1997–98	(United States) Randy Buehler
1998–99	(Germany) Dirk Baberowski
1999–00	(United States) Brian Davis
2000–01	(Japan) Katsuhiro Mori
2001–02	(France) Farid Meraghni
2002–03	(Japan) Masashi Oiso
2003–04	(Netherlands) Julien Nuijten
2005	(France) Pierre Canali
2006	(Germany) Sebastian Thaler
2007	(Japan) Yuuya Watanabe
2008	(Australia) Aaron Nicastri
2009	(Germany) Lino Burgold
2010	(Italy) Andrea Giarola
2011	(United States) Matthias Hunt
2011–12	(Canada) Alexander Hayne
2012–13	(Chile) Felipe Tapia Becerra
2013–14	(United States) Raymond Perez Jr.
2014–15	(United States) Justin Cohen
2015–16	(United States) Oliver Tiu
2016–17	(Canada) Ben Hull
2017–18	(United States) Samuel Ihlenfeldt

== See also ==
- List of Magic: The Gathering Pro Tour events
- Magic: The Gathering World Championship
- Magic: The Gathering Hall of Fame
- Duelists' Convocation International
