= Paulo Vitor Damo da Rosa =

Brazilian Magic: The Gathering player

- Nicknames: PV; PVDDR; Pablo Doritos
- Born: September 29, 1987 (age 39); Porto Alegre, Brazil
- Pro Tour debut: 2003 World Championships – Berlin
- Winnings: $1,083,035
- Pro Tour wins (Top 8): 3 (17)
- Grand Prix wins (Top 8): 2 (24)
- Lifetime Pro Points: 588
- Planeswalker Level: 50 (Archmage)

Paulo Vitor Damo da Rosa (born September 29, 1987) is a Brazilian Magic: The Gathering player. In 2011, Paulo Vitor Damo da Rosa became the youngest player to ever reach 300 lifetime Pro Points. He was elected into the Magic: The Gathering Hall of Fame in 2012 as the first player from South America, and has seventeen Pro Tour Top 8 finishes (with three wins among them), which puts him second for the most Pro Tour Top 8s of all time, and in 2020, Da Rosa won the world championship for the 2019 season. Da Rosa is the all-time leader in prize money won playing professional-level Magic.

== Magic: The Gathering career ==
Paulo Vitor Damo da Rosa began his professional Magic: The Gathering career at the 2003 World Championship in Berlin. A 55th-place finish put da Rosa at the bottom of the money winning places. A year later, he made his second Pro Tour appearance, again at the World Championship.

It was not until 2005 that he began to attract attention, when he reached the top 8 of Grand Prix Porto Alegre, his hometown. The following season da Rosa had his breakthrough. Alongside teammates Willy Edel and Celso Zampere, he made the finals of Pro Tour Charleston, before losing to Tomohiro Kaji, Tomoharu Saitou, and Shouta Yasooka. Just two events later, da Rosa made the top eight again. At Worlds in Paris, he lost in the quarterfinals to the eventual champion, Makihito Mihara, who drew exactly the right card at the last possible moment to win the match. Da Rosa also captained the Brazilian national team to a fourth-place finish. This finish earned him level six, then the highest level in the pro players club, qualified Carlos Romão for all Pro Tour events the following season, and earned invitations to Pro Tour Geneva for the other two members of the team.

2007 was a slower year for da Rosa. He failed to make the top eight of any Pro Tour, and failed to earn money at a Pro Tour for the first time at Pro Tour Yokohama. In 2008, he returned to the top eight. At Pro Tour Hollywood he reached the quarterfinal, losing to eventual player of the year Shuhei Nakamura. Playing almost the same deck, he repeated this feat at the World Championship in Memphis. Despite being considered a heavy favourite, he lost his quarterfinal match to American player Jamie Parke.

2009 started weakly for da Rosa, with day one exits at Pro Tours Kyoto, and Honolulu. However, da Rosa excelled off the Pro Tour, with two Grand Prix top eights and a win at the Brazilian national championship. At Pro Tour Austin, da Rosa made the top eight again, making him the first South American to reach the top eight of five Pro Tours. He made yet another quarterfinal exit, losing to Tsuyoshi Ikeda.

In the 2010 season, da Rosa became only the seventh player to reach six Pro Tour top eights when he won Pro Tour San Juan. At the World Championship that year, da Rosa reached his seventh top eight, losing to the eventual champion, Guillaume Matignon, in the semifinals.

Another Grand Prix top eight followed in Providence in the 2011 season, and just a week later he won Grand Prix Singapore. Da Rosa went on to make his eighth Pro Tour Top 8 at the 2011 World Championship. Paulo made a strong start to the 2012 season, placing 3rd at Grand Prix Orlando and reaching the finals of his ninth Pro Tour Top 8 at Pro Tour Dark Ascension in Honolulu. Da Rosa was invited to the first Players Championship as the highest ranked South American player, where he finished 3rd. The same year, da Rosa was voted into the Magic: The Gathering Hall of Fame, receiving 85.65% of the votes. His induction was conducted at Pro Tour Return to Ravnica in October 2012.

The following seasons were less successful for da Rosa. He made no further Pro Tour top 8s, and at the end of the 2012–13 Pro Tour season he only had 28 points, resulting in Silver level status in the Pro Players Club, where he previously had Platinum status or the equivalent of Platinum since 2006. He maintained his Silver status after the 2013–14 Pro Tour season, collecting 33 points. He did put up three Grand Prix top 8 finishes in 2014, however, after none in 2013, and qualified for the 2014 World Championships, where he finished 23rd.

After two disappointing seasons, the 2014–15 season was a successful one for da Rosa. Although he didn't finish in the top 8 of any Pro Tours, he made the top 8 of three Grand Prix events, winning one, and put up a strong 13th-place finish at Pro Tour Dragons of Tarkir. Most of his top finishes during this season were with the deck called 'Esper Dragons'. By the season's end, da Rosa had amassed 51 Pro Points, good enough for Platinum status in the Pro Players Club, captainship of the Brazilian National team, and an invitation to the 2015 World Championship.

The 2015–16 season, Paulo took 11th place at 2015 World Championship. He would go on to make his tenth Pro Tour Top 8 at Pro Tour Battle For Zendikar, the first Pro Tour of the season. As such, Paulo was at that point in joint second for the most Pro Tour Top 8s of all time alongside Kai Budde. Paulo would also be joined in the Top 8 by the man with the most Pro Tour Top 8s, Jon Finkel, who extended his own record to 16 Pro Tour Top 8s.

In the 2016–17 season, Paulo gained two more Grand Prix placements (Top 4 at Team GP Rotterdam, and finalist at GP Prague), before breaking from Kai Budde's record to gain his eleventh Pro Tour Top 8 at Pro Tour Aether Revolt. In the final Pro Tour of the season (Pro Tour Hour of Devastation), he gained his twelfth Pro Tour Top 8 and second Pro Tour win, with this last accomplishment also making him the Player of the Year.

=== Achievements ===
| Season | Event type | Location | Format | Date | Rank |
|---|---|---|---|---|---|
| 2005 | Grand Prix | Porto Alegre | Rochester Draft | 20–21 November 2005 | 6 |
| 2006 | Pro Tour | Charleston | Team Constructed | 16–18 June 2006 | 2 |
| 2006 | Nationals | Brazil | Special | 9–10 September 2006 | 1 |
| 2006 | Worlds | Paris | Special | 29 November–3 December 2006 | 6 |
| 2007 | Grand Prix | San Francisco | Block Constructed | 25–26 August 2007 | 3 |
| 2007 | Invitational | Essen | Special | 18–21 October 2007 | 5 |
| 2007 | Grand Prix | Daytona Beach | Sealed and Booster Draft | 17–18 November 2007 | 2 |
| 2008 | Pro Tour | Hollywood | Standard | 23–25 May 2008 | 8 |
| 2008 | Worlds | Memphis | Special | 11–14 December 2008 | 5 |
| 2009 | Grand Prix | Barcelona | Standard | 23–24 May 2009 | 3 |
| 2009 | Grand Prix | Seattle | Standard | 30–31 May 2009 | 3 |
| 2009 | Nationals | Brazil | Standard and Booster Draft | 25–26 July 2009 | 1 |
| 2009 | Pro Tour | Austin | Extended and Booster Draft | 16–18 October 2009 | 8 |
| 2010 | Grand Prix | Houston | Extended | 3–4 April 2010 | 6 |
| 2010 | Pro Tour | San Juan | Block Constructed and Booster Draft | 28–30 May 2010 | 1 |
| 2010 | Grand Prix | Portland | Sealed and Booster Draft | 11–12 September 2010 | 8 |
| 2010 | Worlds | Chiba | Special | 9–12 December 2010 | 3 |
| 2011 | Grand Prix | Providence | Legacy | 28–29 May 2011 | 4 |
| 2011 | Grand Prix | Singapore | Standard | 4–5 June 2011 | 1 |
| 2011 | Grand Prix | Santiago | Sealed and Booster Draft | 22–23 October 2011 | 6 |
| 2011 | Worlds | San Francisco | Special | 17–20 November 2011 | 5 |
| 2012 | Grand Prix | Orlando | Standard | 14–15 January 2012 | 3 |
| 2012 | Pro Tour | Honolulu | Standard and Booster Draft | 10–12 February 2012 | 2 |
| 2012 | Grand Prix | Baltimore | Standard | 25–26 February 2012 | 5 |
| 2012–13 | Players Championship | Indianapolis | Special | 29–31 August 2012 | 3 |
| 2013–14 | Grand Prix | Paris | Legacy | 15–16 February 2014 | 8 |
| 2013–14 | Grand Prix | Buenos Aires | Standard | 15–16 March 2014 | 3 |
| 2014–15 | Grand Prix | Nashville | Team Limited | 1–2 November 2014 | 2 |
| 2014–15 | Grand Prix | Kraków | Standard | 18–19 April 2015 | 3 |
| 2014–15 | Grand Prix | São Paulo | Standard | 2–3 May 2015 | 1 |
| 2015–16 | Pro Tour | Milwaukee | Standard and Booster Draft | 16–18 October 2015 | 7 |
| 2016–17 | Grand Prix | Rotterdam | Team Limited | 12–13 November 2016 | 4 |
| 2016–17 | Grand Prix | Prague | Sealed and Booster Draft | 28–29 January 2017 | 2 |
| 2016–17 | Pro Tour | Dublin | Standard and Booster Draft | 3–5 February 2017 | 6 |
| 2016–17 | Pro Tour | Kyoto | Standard and Booster Draft | 28-30 July 2017 | 1 |
| 2017–18 | Grand Prix | Indianapolis | Team Limited | 20-21 January 2018 | 2 |
| 2019-20 | Worlds | Honolulu | Standard | 14-16 February 2020 | 1 |

Last updated: 5 February 2017
Source: Wizards.com

Other accomplishments

- Magic: The Gathering Hall of Fame class of 2012

| Preceded by (United States) Owen Turtenwald | Pro Player of the Year; 2017 | Succeeded by (Argentina) Luis Salvatto |
| Preceded by Pedro Henrique Uehara | Magic Brazilian National Champion; 2006 | Succeeded by Lucas Berthoud |
| Preceded by Vagner Casatti | Magic Brazilian National Champion; 2009 | Succeeded by Eduardo Mendes Lopes |
| Preceded by Marcus Camargo | Magic Brazilian National Champion; 2012 | Succeeded by Willy Edel |
| Preceded by Willy Edel | Magic Brazilian National Champion; 2015–2017 | Succeeded by João Lucas Caparroz |
