= Shouta Yasooka =

Japanese Magic: The Gathering player (born 1984)

Shouta Yasooka 八十岡 翔太
- Born: 10 August 1984 (age 42)
- Nationality: (Japan) Japanese
- Pro Tour debut: 2001 Pro Tour Barcelona
- Winnings: $391,615
- Pro Tour wins (Top 8): 2 (12)
- Grand Prix wins (Top 8): 1 (21)
- Lifetime Pro Points: 600
- Planeswalker Level: 48 (Archmage)

Shouta Yasooka (八十岡 翔太) (also spelled Shota) is a Japanese Magic: The Gathering player. He is best known for his success in the 2006 Pro Tour season, when he won Pro Tour Charleston with Tomohiro Kaji and Tomoharu Saitou, as well as the Player of the Year title. In 2015, Yasooka was elected into the Magic: The Gathering Hall of Fame.

When the Magic Online Player of the Year award was introduced in 2009, Yasooka with his account "yaya3" became the first player to win this honour. He also won the 2009 Magic Online Champion – Sealed title.

Yasooka is currently the lead designer for the Hobby Japan developed trading card games Final Fantasy and WIXOSS.

== Career ==
Yasooka's Pro Tour career began in 2001 at Pro Tour Barcelona. It would be three years until he played his second Pro Tour in 2004 in Kobe. The following season, he put up two more unimpressive Pro Tour finishes in Nagoya, and Atlanta, before finishing in the top sixteen at that year's World Championship. This finish qualified him for Pro Tour Honolulu, and served as a catalyst for a spectacular run the following season.

After another solid finish in Honolulu, Yasooka first came into the spotlight at Grand Prix Hamamatsu. Along with Akira Asahara and Masaya Kitayama, he finished in second at the team event. To follow up on this finish, Yasooka made the top eight individually at the next premier event held in Asia, Grand Prix Kuala Lumpur. Just a week later, Yasooka put up the best finish of his Pro Tour career at Pro Tour Charleston with Tomoharu Saitou, and Tomohiro Kaji. Despite losing his finals match to Willy Edel, Yasooka's team, Kajiharu80, still won the event. At this event, his teammates accurately predicted that he would win the Player of the Year title that season. The latter half of the season took Yasooka all over the world. He added three more Grand Prix top eights to his resume, in Sydney, Toulouse, and New Jersey, before the end of the season. Going into the World Championship, Yasooka had the lead in the Player of the Year race, and despite earning only the minimum two Pro Points there, no one was able to pass him. As a result, Yasooka became the 2006 Player of the Year with a total of 60 Pro Points. Yasooka became the second of five Japanese players to win the Player of the Year title in a row, preceded by Kenji Tsumura and followed by Tomoharu Saito, Shuhei Nakamura and Yuuya Watanabe. This has been referred to as the 'golden age' of Magic in Japan.

Since then, Yasooka has continued to play on the Pro Tour, but without the same degree of success of the 2006 season. He top-eighted three more Grand Prix, Strasbourg, Montreal, and Kitakyushu, in the 2007 season, and Grand Prix Manila in 2008, but did not return to the top eight of a Pro Tour until 2015.

In 2009, Yasooka would be invited to play in the first Magic Online World Championship as a result of becoming Magic Online Player of the Year. The event took place at the same time as the 2009 World Championship. Yasooka would reach the finals of the tournament but ultimately lost to Anssi Myllymäki.

In 2010, Yasooka made the Top 8 of two Grand Prix and the Japanese National Championship. Yasooka's 35 Pro points placed him in 21st place in the 2010 Pro Tour Player of the Year standings.

In 2011, made the Top 8 of three Grand Prix events and the Japanese National Championship. Yasooka gained 52 Pro points through the season, placing him in joint seventh place in the 2011 Pro Tour Player of the Year standings, alongside Yuuya Watanabe and Josh Utter-Leyton.

At the end of the 2012 season, Yasooka had amassed 53 Pro Points, which was enough to secure himself a place in the first ever Magic Players Championship. Yasooka's 53 pro points placed him seventh in the overall Pro Players Club standings for the second season in a row.

Shouta Yasooka won his second pro tour in the Pro Tour season 2016-17, Pro Tour Kaladesh in Honolulu using Grixis control.

== Achievements ==
=== Top 8 appearances ===
| Season | Event type | Location | Format | Date | Rank |
|---|---|---|---|---|---|
| 2006 | Grand Prix | Hamamatsu | Team Constructed | 8–9 April 2006 | 2 |
| 2006 | Grand Prix | Kuala Lumpur | Sealed and Booster Draft | 3–4 June 2006 | 6 |
| 2006 | Pro Tour | Charleston, South Carolina | Team Constructed | 16–18 June 2006 | 1 |
| 2006 | Grand Prix | Toulouse | Sealed and Booster Draft | 24–25 June 2006 | 7 |
| 2006 | Grand Prix | Sydney | Sealed and Booster Draft | 7–8 October 2006 | 7 |
| 2006 | Grand Prix | New Jersey | Sealed and Booster Draft | 11–12 November 2006 | 8 |
| 2007 | Grand Prix | Strasbourg | Block Constructed | 19–20 May 2007 | 3 |
| 2007 | Grand Prix | Montreal | Block Constructed | 23–24 June 2007 | 8 |
| 2007 | Invitational | Essen | Special | 18–21 October 2007 | 8 |
| 2007 | Grand Prix | Kitakyushu | Sealed and Booster Draft | 10–11 November 2007 | 2 |
| 2008 | Grand Prix | Manila | Block Constructed | 30–31 August 2008 | 2 |
| 2010 | Grand Prix | Kuala Lumpur | Standard | 13–14 March 2010 | 5 |
| 2010 | Grand Prix | Sendai | Standard | 5–6 June 2010 | 3 |
| 2010 | Nationals | Kyoto | Standard and Booster Draft | 2–4 July 2010 | 5 |
| 2011 | Grand Prix | Kobe | Extended | 23–24 April 2011 | 1 |
| 2011 | Grand Prix | Singapore | Standard | 4–5 June 2011 | 5 |
| 2011 | Nationals | Osaka | Special | 15–17 July 2011 | 6 |
| 2011 | Grand Prix | Brisbane | Standard | 15–16 October 2011 | 8 |
| 2012–13 | Grand Prix | Boston-Worcester | Sealed and Booster Draft | 25–26 August 2012 | 8 |
| 2012–13 | Players Championship | Indianapolis | Special | 29–31 August 2012 | 2 |
| 2013–14 | Grand Prix | Kyoto | Team Limited | 23–24 November 2013 | 4 |
| 2013–14 | Grand Prix | Shizuoka | Standard | 21–22 December 2013 | 4 |
| 2013–14 | Grand Prix | Kuala Lumpur | Limited | 25–26 January 2014 | 6 |
| 2014–15 | Pro Tour | Brussels | Standard and Booster Draft | 9–12 April 2015 | 2 |
| 2014–15 | Grand Prix | Kyoto | Legacy | 18–19 April 2015 | 7 |
| 2015–16 | Pro Tour | Madrid | Standard and Booster Draft | 22–24 April 2016 | 4 |
| 2016–17 | Grand Prix | Rimini | Standard | 13–14 August 2016 | 6 |
| 2016–17 | Worlds | Seattle | Special | 1–4 September 2016 | 4 |
| 2016–17 | Pro Tour | Hawaii | Standard and Booster Draft | 14–16 October 2016 | 1 |
| 2016–17 | Nationals | Shizuoka | Standard and Booster Draft | 9–10 September 2017 | 2 |
| 2017–18 | World Magic Cup | Nice | National team | 1–3 December 2017 | 1 |

Last updated: 16 October 2016
Source: Wizards.com

Other accomplishments

- Pro Tour Player of the Year 2006
- Magic Online Player of the Year 2009
- 2009 Magic Online Champion – Sealed
- Magic: The Gathering Hall of Fame class of 2015

== Reputation ==
Shouta Yasooka is widely regarded as being a talented deck-builder. He is known to favor blue-based control decks, and decks designed by him are sometimes referred to as 'Yaso-Control' or 'Yaso-Con' decks. Yasooka is also known for his fast and technical play style, an aspect of his game that is considered particularly impressive given his preference for control decks requiring much decision-making. In January 2012, Paulo Vitor Damo da Rosa named Yasooka as the main player he would most like to add to Team ChannelFireball. Paulo stated "...he always comes up with the craziest deck ideas and they all seem very bad, but he always does well and is insanely good, so I would like to see how he thinks".

In an episode of Magic TV aired in 2012, Luis Scott-Vargas listed Yasooka eighth in the Top 8 players he least wants to play against in tournament play. He explained that he believed that Yasooka is one of the most underrated players in professional Magic, and could make it into the Magic: The Gathering Hall of Fame if it were not for his lack of Pro Tour Top 8s. He was eventually elected into the Hall of Fame at the end of 2015 season, during which he had posted his second Pro Tour top 8 appearance, at Pro Tour Dragons of Tarkir in Brussels.

| Preceded by (Japan) Kenji Tsumura | Pro Player of the Year; 2006 | Succeeded by (Japan) Tomoharu Saitou |
| Preceded by n/a | Magic Online Player of the Year; 2009 | Succeeded by (United States) Bing Luke |
| Preceded by Yuuya Watanabe | Japanese National Champion; 2016 | Succeeded by Kenta Harane |
