= Asahara =

Asahara (written: 朝原 lit. "morning field", 浅原 lit. "shallow field" or 麻原 lit. "cannabis field") is a Japanese surname. Notable people with the surname include:

- Akira Asahara, Japanese Magic: The Gathering player
- Nobuharu Asahara (朝原 宣治) (born 1972), Japanese sprinter and long jumper
- Shoko Asahara (麻原 彰晃) (1955–2018), Japanese religious leader, founder of Aum Shinrikyo and terrorist mastermind
- Takuma Asahara (浅原拓真) (born 1987), Japanese international rugby union player
