= Ben Stark =

American Magic: The Gathering player

Benjamin Stark
- Nickname: BenS
- Nationality: American
- Pro Tour debut: 1999 Pro Tour London
- Winnings: US$266,765
- Pro Tour wins (Top 8): 1 (5)
- Grand Prix wins (Top 8): 2 (23)
- Lifetime Pro Points: 451
- Planeswalker Level: 50 (Archmage)

Benjamin "Ben" Stark is an American Magic: The Gathering player. His career accomplishments include back to back Pro Tour Top 8s in 2004 and winning Pro Tour Paris in 2011. In 2013, he was voted into the Magic: The Gathering Hall of Fame.

== Magic: The Gathering ==
Beginning his career in 1999, Stark first came to prominence in 2004, making back to back Pro Tour Top 8s at Pro Tour Kobe and Pro Tour San Diego.

Stark took a break from the game, not returning until late 2009. Since his return, Ben Stark has been considered a Limited expert.

Stark went on to have great success in the 2011 Pro Tour Season, reaching the finals of Grand Prix Atlanta and winning his first Pro Tour at Pro Tour Paris. These finishes, along with other strong finishes throughout the season, led Ben to be a front-runner in the 2011 Pro Player of Year race. Ultimately, Ben would finish in joint 3rd place in the Player of the Year standings, alongside Martin Juza, with 56 pro points. Commentators argued that Stark hurt his chances of winning the Player of the Year title by failing to attend US Nationals and certain Grand Prix events.

The 2012-13 Pro Tour Season was another very successful season for Stark. Stark made the Top 8 of four Grand Prix events, including a win at Grand Prix Indianapolis, and made his fourth Pro Tour Top 8 at Pro Tour Gatecrash. Stark's performance left him with a season total of 61 Pro Points, placing him 5th in the Player of the Year race, and an invite to the 2013 World Championship, where he made it into the Top 4 players after the Swiss rounds of the World Championship. Stark lost to Shahar Shenhar in the semifinals of the World Championship taking 3rd Place overall.

== Achievements ==
=== Top 8 appearances ===
Season	Event type	Location	Format	Date	Rank
2003–04	Grand Prix	Kansas City, Missouri	Rochester Draft	18–19 October 2003	3
2003–04	Grand Prix	Anaheim	Extended	13–14 December 2003	5
2003–04	Pro Tour	Kobe	Block Constructed	27–29 February 2004	7
2003–04	Pro Tour	San Diego	Booster Draft	14–16 May 2004	6
2009	Grand Prix	Boston	Sealed and Booster Draft	1–2 August 2009	2
2010	Grand Prix	Toronto	Sealed and Booster Draft	23–24 October 2010	4
2011	Grand Prix	Atlanta	Extended	22–23 January 2011	2
2011	Pro Tour	Paris	Standard and Booster Draft	10–13 February 2011	1
2012–13	Grand Prix	Atlanta	Legacy	30 June–1 July 2012	5
2012–13	Grand Prix	San Jose, Costa Rica	Sealed and Booster Draft	15–16 September 2012	3
2012–13	Grand Prix	Indianapolis	Sealed and Booster Draft	22–23 December 2012	1
2012–13	Pro Tour	Montreal	Standard and Booster Draft	15–17 February 2013	3
2012–13	Grand Prix	Charlotte	Sealed and Booster Draft	23–24 February 2013	7
2013–14	Grand Prix	Providence	Team Limited	8–9 June 2013	4
2013–14	Grand Prix	Rimini	Sealed and Booster Draft	27–28 July 2013	5
2013–14	Worlds	Amsterdam	Special	31 July–4 August 2013	3
2013–14	Grand Prix	Detroit	Modern	14–15 September 2013	4
2013–14	Grand Prix	Dallas/Fort Worth	Standard	7–8 December 2013	4
2014–15	Grand Prix	Baltimore	Sealed and Booster Draft	13–14 December 2014	3
2014–15	Grand Prix	Memphis	Standard	21–22 February 2015	2
2014–15	Grand Prix	Las Vegas	Sealed and Booster Draft	30–31 May 2015	5
2015–16	Grand Prix	Detroit	Team Limited	15–16 August 2015	2
2015–16	Grand Prix	Paris	Standard	19-20 March 2016	2
2015–16	Grand Prix	Sydney	Limited	30-31 July 2016	3
2016–17	Grand Prix	Warsaw	Standard	29-30 October 2016	6
2016–17	Grand Prix	New Jersey	Standard	11-12 March 2017	4
2016–17	Grand Prix	Mexico City	Team Limited	7-9 April 2017	1
2017–18	Grand Prix	Atlanta	Standard	11-12 November 2017	2
2018–19	Pro Tour	Minneapolis	Team Limited	3-5 February 2018	2

Last updated: 5 August 2018
Source: Event Coverage at Wizards.com
