= Kenji Tsumura =

Japanese player of Magic: The Gathering

Kenji Tsumura 津村 健志
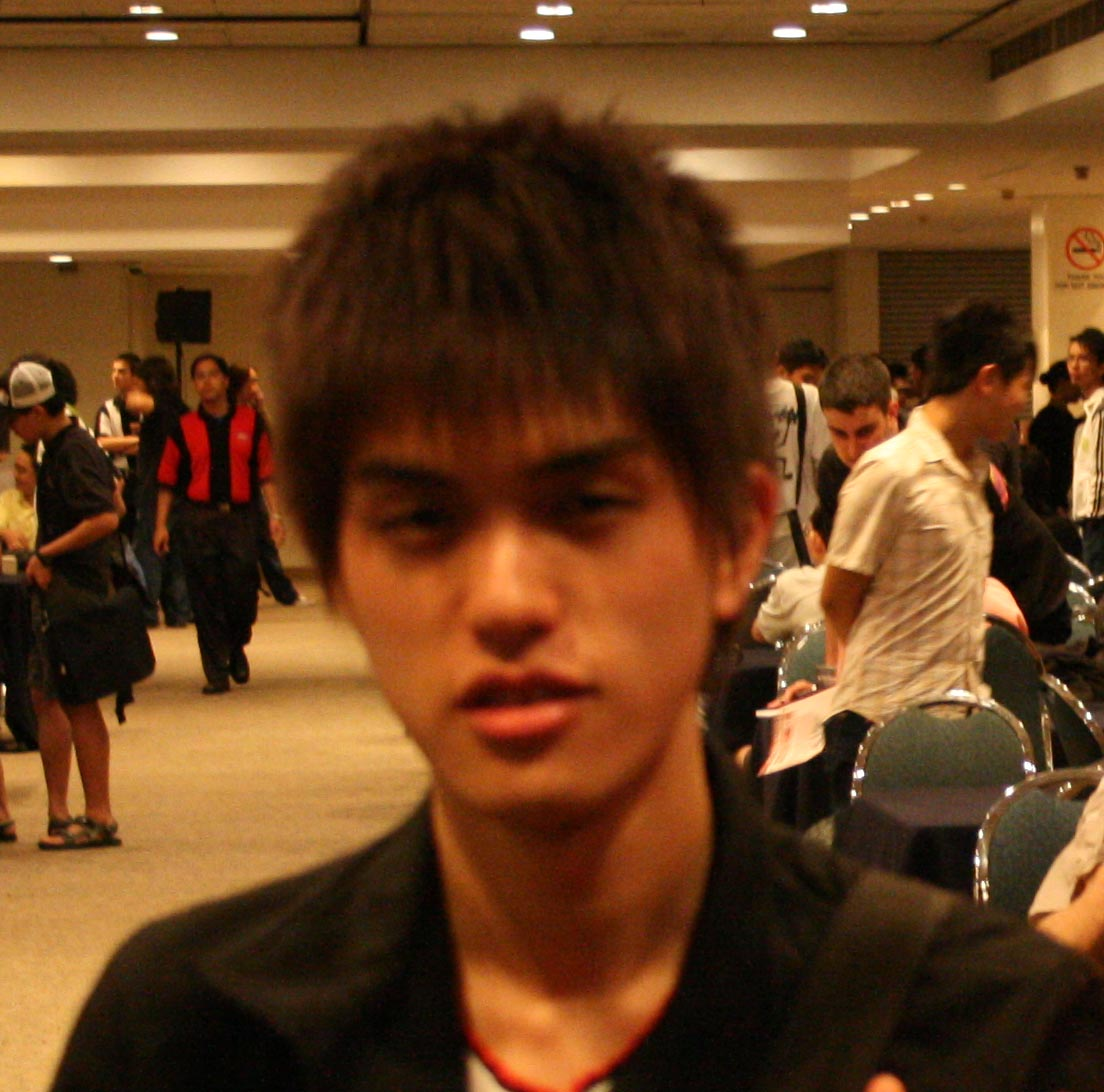
- Born: 19 August 1986 (age 40)
- Nationality: (Japan) Japanese
- Pro Tour debut: 2003 Pro Tour Chicago
- Winnings: US$191,617
- Pro Tour wins (Top 8): 0 (6)
- Grand Prix wins (Top 8): 2 (13)
- Lifetime Pro Points: 261
- Highest Constructed Rating: 2260
- Highest Limited Rating: 2256
- Planeswalker Level: 47 (Archmage)

Kenji Tsumura (津村 健志) (born 19 August 1986) is a professional Magic: The Gathering player from Japan. He is one of only eight players to have reached the top eight of a Pro Tour more than five times.

== Career ==
Tsumura debuted at the 2003 Pro Tour in Chicago, United States. Over the next two seasons, he qualified for most Pro Tours, but never earned more than the minimum two pro points. The 2005 season saw Tsumura make his breakthrough. A twenty-first-place finish at the first Pro Tour of the season in Columbus, United States was a sign of things to come. At Pro Tour Atlanta, United States, he made the final day of a Pro Tour for the first time. Alongside teammates Tomoharu Saitou and Tomohiro Kaji, Tsumura was eliminated in the semifinals by the eventual winners, Nova (consisting of David Rood, Gabe Tsang, and Gabriel Nassif). At the next Pro Tour, held in Philadelphia, Tsumura proved that Atlanta was no fluke. He made the top eight a second time, this time making it all the way to the finals before losing to Gadiel Szleifer. At Pro Tour Los Angeles, United States, Tsumura made the top eight for a third time in one season, once again losing to the eventual winner, Antoine Ruel, this time in the semifinals. In addition to his three Pro Tour top eights, Tsumura also reached the top eight of four Grand Prix events. At the end of the season, he earned the Player of the Year award, besting Olivier Ruel 84 points to 83. He did so without ever having made day two of a Limited format Pro Tour, so he made it his goal to improve in this format the following season. He succeeded with this goal, winning back to back Grand Prix events at Kuala Lumpur, Malaysia and Toulouse, France, both of which were Limited. In addition, Tsumura also made the top eight of Pro Tour Kobe, losing to Bastien Perez in the quarterfinals. The 2007 season saw Tsumura make the top eight of a Pro Tour for the fifth time in Geneva, Switzerland. After the 2007 season, Tsumura announced that he would take a break from traveling to Magic tournaments in order to complete his studies. Nevertheless, he managed a top eight appearance at a Grand Prix on home turf and another top eight appearance at the 2008 World Championship in Memphis, United States. In 2012, Tsumura was inducted into the Magic: The Gathering Hall of Fame at Pro Tour Return to Ravnica. Later that year he made another top eight appearance at Grand Prix Nagoya, Japan.

== Accomplishments ==
=== Top 8 appearances ===
Season	Event type	Location	Format	Date	Rank
2003–04	Nationals	Osaka, Japan	Special	11–13 June 2004	2
2005	Grand Prix	Osaka, Japan	Team Limited	8–9 January 2005	4
2005	Pro Tour	Atlanta, United States	Team Limited	11–13 March 2005	4
2005	Pro Tour	Philadelphia, United States	Block Constructed	6–8 May 2005	2
2005	Grand Prix	Niigata, Niigata, Japan	Block Constructed	23–24 July 2005	6
2005	Grand Prix	Salt Lake City, United States	Block Constructed	27–28 August 2005	3
2005	Pro Tour	Los Angeles, United States	Extended	28–30 October 2005	3
2005	Grand Prix	Beijing, China	Extended	26–27 November 2005	8
2006	Invitational	Los Angeles, United States	Special	10–12 May 2006	3
2006	Grand Prix	Kuala Lumpur, Malaysia	Limited	3–4 June 2006	1
2006	Grand Prix	Toulouse, France	Limited	24–25 June 2006	1
2006	Grand Prix	St. Louis, United States	Limited	22–23 July 2006	3
2006	Pro Tour	Kobe, Japan	Booster Draft	20–22 October 2006	5
2007	Pro Tour	Geneva, Switzerland	Booster Draft	9–11 February 2007	3
2007	Grand Prix	Dallas, United States	Extended	24–25 February 2007	3
2007	Grand Prix	Stockholm, Sweden	Limited	5–6 May 2007	3
2007	Grand Prix	Montreal, Canada	Block Constructed	23–24 June 2007	4
2007	Invitational	Essen, Germany	Special	18–21 October 2007	4
2007	Grand Prix	Kitakyuushuu, Japan	Limited	10–11 November 2007	7
2008	Grand Prix	Shizuoka, Shizuoka, Japan	Standard	8–9 March 2008	3
2008	Worlds	Memphis, United States	Special	11–14 December 2008	6
2009	Nationals	Fukuyama, Japan	Special	18–20 July 2009	4
2012–13	Grand Prix	Nagoya, Japan	Standard	8–9 December 2012	6
2015–16	World Magic Cup	Barcelona, Spain	National team	11–13 December 2015	8

Last updated: 9 December 2012
Source: Event Coverage at Wizards.com

Other accomplishments

- Pro Tour Player of the Year 2005

Preceded by (France) Gabriel Nassif	Pro Player of the Year; 2005	Succeeded by (Japan) Shouta Yasooka
