= Olivier Ruel =

French player of Magic: The Gathering

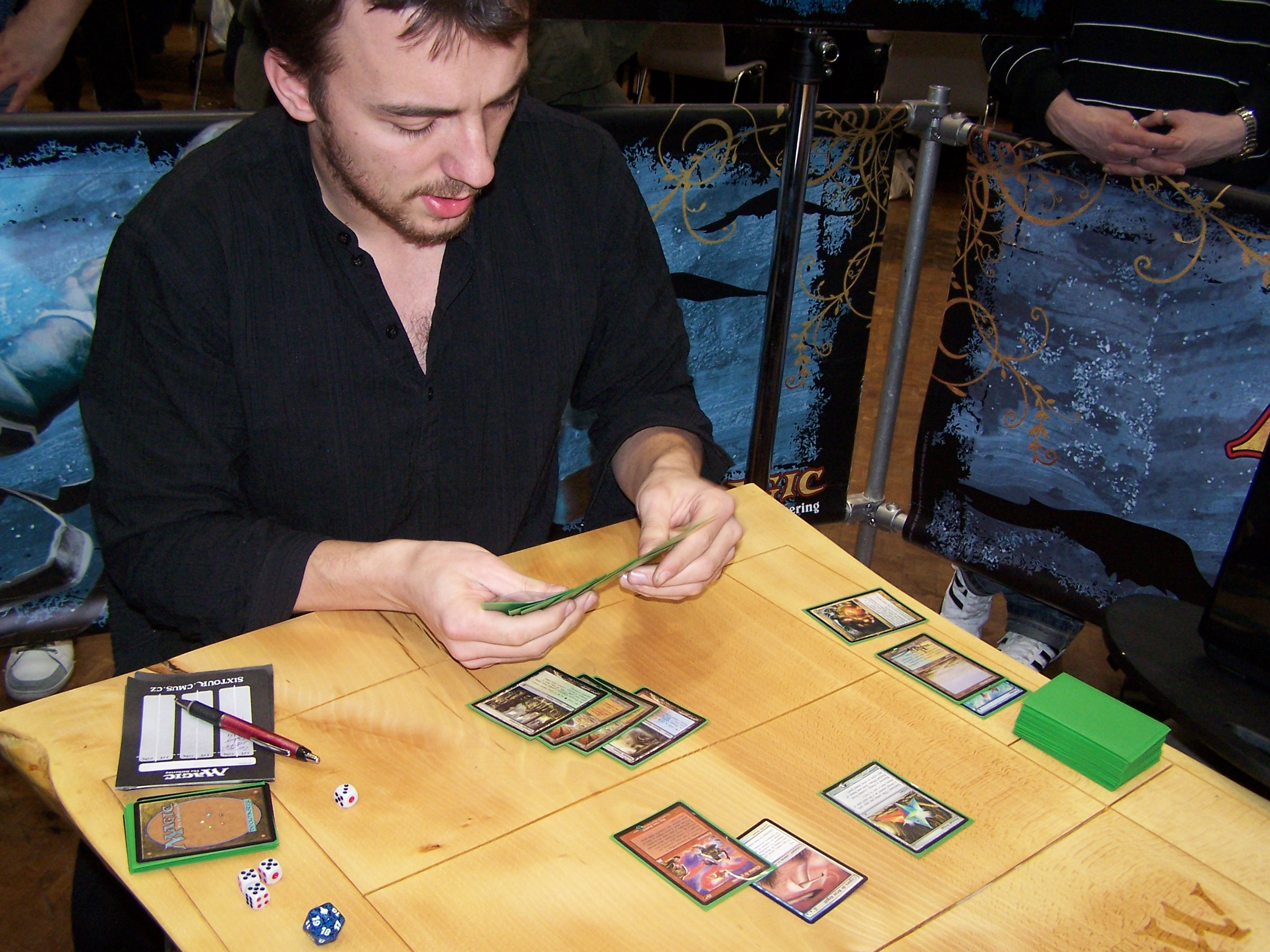
- Born: July 24, 1981 (age 45); Aubervilliers, France
- Nationality: (France) French
- Winnings: $298,515
- Pro Tour wins (Top 8): 0 (5)
- Grand Prix wins (Top 8): 5 (28)
- Lifetime Pro Points: 518
- Planeswalker Level: 50 (Archmage)

Olivier Ruel (born 24 July 1981 in Aubervilliers, France) is one of the most successful professional Magic: The Gathering players. He holds the record for most Grand Prix Top 8’s, and is one of twenty players with five or more Pro Tour top 8’s. After Pro Tour San Juan 2010, Olivier surpassed Kai Budde as the leader in lifetime Pro Points. However, Budde regained that title later that season.

== Career ==
Born in Aubervilliers, France, Olivier and his brother Antoine started playing Magic in 1994. Olivier won the first Pro Tour Qualifier he attended and thereby qualified for Pro Tour Rome 1999. After a mid-table result there he teamed up with his brother and Florent Jeudon for Pro Tour Washington D.C., going under the name of "Phenome J". They finished eleventh at the Pro Tour and quickly followed that up with a victory at Grand Prix Cannes, now going as "Black Ops". These achievements were rewarded with a ranking-based invitation to the Masters Series at Pro Tour New York 2000. Again Black Ops prevailed defeating Game Empire consisting of Alan Comer, Brian Selden, and Kurt Burgner as well as the Antarctica-team of Jon Finkel, O'Mahoney-Schwartz brothers.

Their first major individual success came several months later when the Ruel brothers met in the final of Grand Prix Porto where Antoine defeated Olivier. Another few months later in May 2001 Olivier secured himself a place on the French national team by finishing third at French Nationals. His first Pro Tour Top 8 followed in March 2002 where he finished second at Pro Tour Osaka. Olivier has since racked up an unprecedented 28 Grand Prix Top 8 finishes, winning five. He also has five Pro Tour Top 8 finishes and won the French Nationals in 2004. In 2008, Olivier was voted in the Hall of Fame and was inducted at the World Championship in Memphis.

== Accomplishments ==
=== Top 8 Appearances ===
Season	Event type	Location	Format	Date	Rank
1999–00	Grand Prix	Madrid	Extended	29–30 January 2000	5
1999–00	Grand Prix	Cannes	Team Limited	26–27 February 2000	1
1999–00	Masters	New York	Team Limited	16 April 2000	1
2000–01	Grand Prix	Porto	Rochester Draft	23–24 September 2000	2
2000–01	Grand Prix	Valencia	Sealed and Booster Draft	10–11 February 2001	2
2000–01	Masters	Tokyo	Team Limited	16–18 March 2001	3
2000–01	Nationals	Avignon	Standard and Booster Draft	12–13 May 2001	3
2001–02	Grand Prix	Shizuoka, Shizuoka	Rochester Draft	13–14 October 2001	4
2001–02	Grand Prix	Biarritz	Rochester Draft	24–25 November 2001	8
2001–02	Grand Prix	Lisbon	Extended	19–20 January 2002	4
2001–02	Pro Tour	Osaka	Block Constructed	15–17 March 2002	2
2001–02	Grand Prix	Barcelona	Sealed and Booster Draft	23–24 March 2002	3
2001–02	Grand Prix	Naples	Sealed and Booster Draft	6–7 April 2002	4
2002–03	Nationals	Chambéry	Standard and Booster Draft	3–4 May 2003	3
2003–04	Pro Tour	Amsterdam	Rochester Draft	16–18 January 2004	4
2003–04	Grand Prix	Hong Kong	Sealed and Booster Draft	6–7 March 2004	2
2003–04	Nationals	Tours	Standard and Booster Draft	17–18 July 2004	1
2005	Pro Tour	Columbus	Extended	29–31 October 2004	4
2005	Grand Prix	Helsinki	Rochester Draft	6–7 November 2004	1
2005	Pro Tour	Philadelphia	Block Constructed	6–8 May 2005	4
2005	Grand Prix	Bologna	Sealed and Booster Draft	11–12 June 2005	1
2005	Grand Prix	Copenhagen	Extended	5–6 November 2005	5
2005	Grand Prix	Bilbao	Extended	19–20 November 2005	1
2005	Grand Prix	Beijing	Extended	26–27 November 2005	3
2006	Grand Prix	Dortmund	Sealed and Booster Draft	18–19 February 2006	7
2006	Pro Tour	Honolulu	Standard	3–5 March 2006	4
2006	Grand Prix	Barcelona	Sealed and Booster Draft	8–9 April 2006	5
2006	Grand Prix	Toulouse	Sealed and Booster Draft	24–25 June 2006	6
2007	Grand Prix	Singapore	Extended	3–4 March 2007	5
2007	Grand Prix	Krakow	Standard	3–4 November 2007	4
2007	Grand Prix	Kitakyuushuu	Sealed and Booster Draft	10–11 November 2007	4
2008	Grand Prix	Shizuoka, Shizuoka	Standard	8–9 March 2008	2
2008	Grand Prix	Buenos Aires	Standard	28–29 June 2008	6
2008	Nationals	Tours	Standard and Booster Draft	2–3 August 2008	2
2008	Grand Prix	Okayama	Sealed and Booster Draft	20–21 November 2008	6
2008	Grand Prix	Auckland	Sealed and Booster Draft	6–7 December 2008	5
2009	Nationals	Aix-en-Provence	Standard and Booster Draft	25–26 July 2009	6
2009	Grand Prix	Brighton	Sealed and Booster Draft	8–9 August 2009	1
2011	Nationals	La Rochelle	Standard and Booster Draft	22–24 July 2011	7
2012–13	Grand Prix	Lyon	Modern	3–4 November 2012	6
2014–15	Grand Prix	Lille	Legacy	4–5 July 2015	2

Last updated: 5 July 2015
Source: Wizards.com

=== Other accomplishments ===
- Inducted into the Hall of Fame in 2008

Preceded by Stéphane Damizet	Magic French National Champion; 2004	Succeeded by Julien Goron
