= Carlos Romão =

Brazilian Magic: The Gathering player (born 1982)

Carlos Eduardo Romão
- Nicknames: The Brazilian Huey; Jaba
- Born: 29 June 1982 (age 43)
- Nationality: Brazilian
- Pro Tour debut: 1999 Pro Tour New York
- Winnings: US$145,410
- Pro Tour wins (Top 8): 1 (2)
- Grand Prix wins (Top 8): 5 (10)
- Median Pro Tour Finish: 124
- Lifetime Pro Points: 246
- Planeswalker Level: 47 (Archmage)

Carlos Eduardo Romão is a Brazilian Magic: The Gathering player. He is known for his win at the 2002 World Championships. Along with Diego Ostrovich, he is widely regarded as the first South American to achieve success on the Pro Tour, and was the first South American to win a Pro Tour.

== Achievements ==
Season	Event type	Location	Format	Date	Rank
1999–00	Grand Prix	São Paulo	Limited	6–7 November 1999	5
1999–00	Latin America Championship	Santiago, Chile	Standard and Booster Draft	23–25 June 2000	4
2000–01	Grand Prix	Rio de Janeiro	Sealed and Booster Draft	10–11 March 2001	1
2001–02	Nationals	Brazil	Standard and Booster Draft		5-8
2001–02	Worlds	Sydney	Special	14–18 August 2002	1
2002–03	Invitational	Seattle	Special	18–20 October 2002	6
2002–03	Grand Prix	Sevilla	Sealed and Booster Draft	22–23 February 2003	2
2002–03	Nationals	Brazil	Standard and Booster Draft		2
2002–03	Grand Prix	Amsterdam	Team Limited	7–8 June 2003	1
2003–04	Invitational	Los Angeles	Special	11–13 May 2004	3
2005	Invitational	Los Angeles	Special	17–20 May 2005	4
2006	Nationals	Brazil	Standard and Booster Draft		3
2006	Grand Prix	Phoenix, Arizona	Sealed and Booster Draft	2–3 September 2006	1
2008	Grand Prix	Kansas City	Sealed and Booster Draft	18–19 October 2008	2
2009	Nationals	São Paulo	Standard and Booster Draft	25–26 July 2009	2
2010	Grand Prix	Washington, D.C.	Standard	22–23 May 2010	8
2015–16	Grand Prix	São Paulo	Team Limited	2–3 July 2016	1
2016–17	Grand Prix	Atlanta	Limited	8–9 October 2016	1
2016–17	Pro Tour	Honolulu	Standard and Booster Draft	14–16 October 2016	2
2017–18	Grand Prix	São Paulo	Modern	12–13 August 2017	5
2017–18	Nationals	São Paulo	Standard and Booster Draft	14–15 October 2017	1

Last updated: 14 December 2017
Source: Wizards.com

In 2010, Carlos Romão was invited to play in the 2010 Magic Online World Championships. The tournament only contained 12 players, the winners of 10 invitation-only Season Championships, the winner of one Last Chance Qualifier and the Magic Online Player of the Year. Romão earned his place by winning the fourth Season Championship. The event took place alongside the paper World Championships in Chiba, Japan. Romão would win the tournament defeating Akira Asahara 2-1 in the finals to take the title of 2010 Magic Online World Champion.

Preceded by (Netherlands) Tom van de Logt	Magic World Champion; 2002	Succeeded by (Germany) Daniel Zink
Preceded by (Finland) Anssi Myllymäki	Magic Online World Champion; 2010	Succeeded by (United States) Reid Duke
