= Anton Jonsson =

Swedish Magic: The Gathering player (born 1977)

- Born: September 12, 1977 (age 49)
- Nationality: (Sweden) Swedish
- Pro Tour debut: Pro Tour Tokyo 2001
- Winnings: US$136,080
- Pro Tour wins (Top 8): 0 (5)
- Grand Prix wins (Top 8): 1 (9)
- Median Pro Tour Finish: 110
- Lifetime Pro Points: 212
- Planeswalker Level: 45 (Battlemage)

Anton Jonsson is a Swedish Magic: The Gathering player. He has retired from professional Magic. At the height of his career, Jonsson was considered one of the best players in the game, and was especially known for his proficiency at Limited, having reached the Top 8 of a Pro Tour five times. In 2010, Jonsson came back to play in Grand Prix Gothenburg, where he reached yet another Top 8, five years after his last Top 8 appearance. He was voted into the Magic The Gathering Pro Tour Hall of Fame in 2011 along with Steve O'Mahoney-Schwartz and Shuhei Nakamura.

== Achievements ==
Season	Event type	Location	Format	Date	Rank
2001–02	Grand Prix	Oslo	Block Constructed	22–23 September 2001	2
2001–02	Pro Tour	New Orleans	Extended	2–4 November 2001	5
2001–02	Pro Tour	Nice	Booster Draft	3–5 May 2002	6
2001-02	Nationals	Sweden	Standard and Booster Draft	23–24 May 2002	1
2001–02	European Championship	Amsterdam	Special	28–30 June 2002	6
2002–03	Masters	Houston	Booster Draft	8–11 November 2002	8
2002–03	Grand Prix	Reims	Extended	30 November–1 December 2002	8
2002–03	Grand Prix	Sevilla	Sealed and Booster Draft	22–23 February 2003	1
2002–03	Grand Prix	Prague	Sealed and Booster Draft	12–13 April 2003	7
2002–03	Grand Prix	Amsterdam	Team Limited	7–8 June 2003	3
2003–04	Pro Tour	Amsterdam	Rochester Draft	16–18 January 2004	3
2003–04	Grand Prix	Bochum	Team Limited	17–18 April 2004	2
2003–04	Pro Tour	San Diego	Booster Draft	14–16 May 2004	4
2003-04	Nationals	Sweden	Standard and Booster Draft	21–23 May 2004	2
2005	Grand Prix	Helsinki	Rochester Draft	6–7 November 2004	5
2005	Pro Tour	Nagoya	Rochester Draft	28–30 January 2005	2
2005	Grand Prix	Lisbon	Sealed and Booster Draft	23–24 April 2005	8
2010	Grand Prix	Gothenburg	Sealed and Booster Draft	28–29 August 2010	2
2011	Nationals	Sweden	Standard and Booster Draft	28–28 May 2011	8

Last updated: 28 April 2014
Source: Wizards.com
