= Frank Karsten (Magic: The Gathering player) =

Dutch Magic: The Gathering player (born 1984)

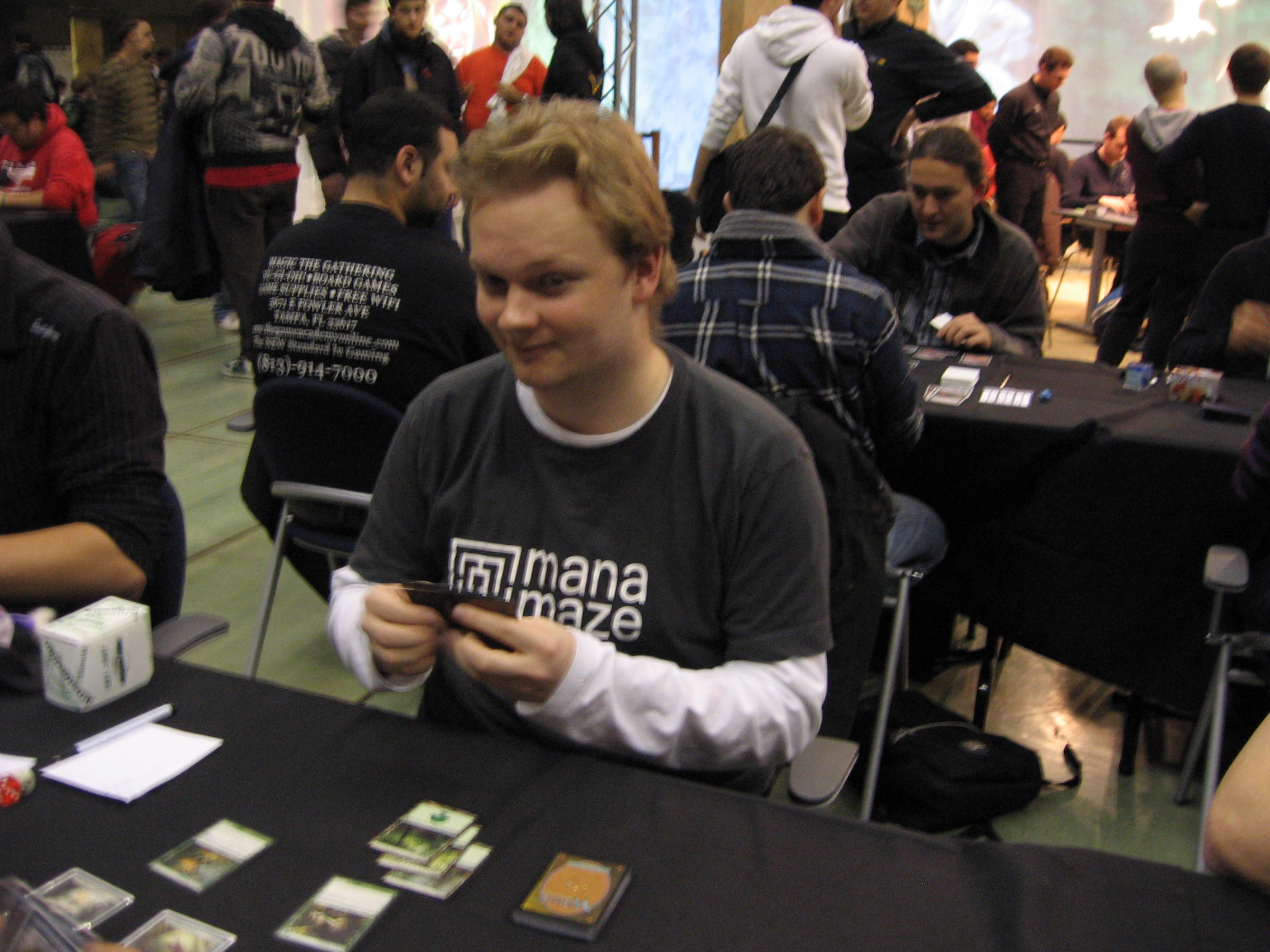
- Born: June 19, 1984 (age 42)
- Nationality: (Netherlands) Dutch
- Pro Tour debut: Worlds 2000
- Winnings: US$204,853
- Pro Tour wins (Top 8): 0 (3)
- Grand Prix wins (Top 8): 0 (7)
- Lifetime Pro Points: 442
- Planeswalker Level: 50 (Archmage)

Frank Karsten (born 19 June 1984) is a Dutch Magic: The Gathering player. His achievements include three Pro Tour Top 8 appearances, including a second-place finish at the 2005 World Championships, and seven Grand Prix Top 8s. He is a member of the Magic: The Gathering Hall of Fame. Karsten is considered one of the game's foremost analytical minds and writers. He has since been considered mostly retired from Magic pro play, and has become a writer for Wizards' Magic event coverage.

== Career ==
Frank Karsten's professional Magic career began in 2000. He made the top eight of the Dutch National Championship, and finished fifth, one spot short of making the national team. However, this qualified him for the European Championship, where he finished ninth, one spot short of the elimination rounds. These finishes ensured that despite the near misses, Karsten qualified for the World Championships on Elo rating.

The following season, Karsten played four of six Pro Tours. Off tour, he made the top eight of Grand Prix Cologne, and the Dutch National Championship, this time earning a spot on the national team. Karsten's breakout performance came in In 2001–02. Alongside Victor van den Broek, and Jelger Wiegersma, he finished third at the Masters Series held at Pro Tour Osaka. In spite of this performance, his other finishes on the Pro Tour were unremarkable, with a 42nd-place finish in the main event at Osaka being his best finish of that season. Over the next two years, Karsten put up solid finishes, including a fifth place at Pro Tour Boston 2002, once again with Victor van der Broek and Jelger Wiegersma, and a tenth-place finish at Pro Tour San Diego 2004. In addition, he reached the top eight of Grand Prix Zürich, Birmingham, and London in 2003–04.

In 2005, Karsten finally made the top eight of a Pro Tour, finishing sixth at Pro Tour Nagoya. When the Pro Tour returned to Japan for the World Championships that year, Karsten made the top eight yet again. His quarterfinal match against Ding Leong is remembered as having one of the longest single games in Pro Tour history at 90 minutes. In the end, Karsten made it as far as the final match, before losing to Katsuhiro Mori. After 2005, Karsten returned to performing well without standing out. His best result in the next couple of seasons was 10th place at Pro Tour Yokohama 2007, which received some attention as Karsten was so ill that he had to play with a bucket at his feet throughout the event.

In 2008, Karsten made his third Pro Tour top eight at the World Championship in Memphis, advancing to the semifinals in which he lost to Tsuyoshi Ikeda. This Top 8 appearance was largely known for the way Karsten made the card choices for his Standard, which he did entirely by mathematical formula, based on previous Top 8 deck lists, rather than thorough playtesting. In 2009, Karsten was inducted into the Pro Tour Hall of Fame alongside Kamiel Cornelissen and Antoine Ruel, receiving 44.79% of the votes. Despite attending most PTs Karsten has since been considered mostly retired from Magic pro play as he focused more on his work as a Magic writer and data scientist.

In May 2024, Karsten won the first Disney Lorcana European Challenge in Lille, France.

== Accomplishments ==
| Season | Event type | Location | Format | Date | Rank |
|---|---|---|---|---|---|
| 1999–00 | Nationals | Netherlands | Standard and Booster Draft | 2000 | 5 |
| 2000–01 | Grand Prix | Cologne | Limited | 24–25 February 2001 | 6 |
| 2000–01 | Nationals | Netherlands | Standard and Booster Draft | 2001 | 3 |
| 2001–02 | Masters | Osaka | Team Limited | 14–17 March 2002 | 3 |
| 2003–04 | Grand Prix | London | Block Constructed | 22–24 August 2003 | 8 |
| 2003–04 | Grand Prix | Birmingham | Booster Draft | 27–28 March 2004 | 3 |
| 2003–04 | Grand Prix | Zürich | Booster Draft | 26–27 June 2004 | 4 |
| 2005 | Pro Tour | Nagoya | Rochester Draft | 28–30 January 2005 | 6 |
| 2005 | Grand Prix | Salt Lake City | Block Constructed | 27–28 August 2005 | 5 |
| 2005 | Grand Prix | Mexico City | Block Constructed | 3–4 September 2005 | 3 |
| 2005 | Worlds | Yokohama | Standard and Booster Draft | 30 November–4 December 2005 | 2 |
| 2006 | Nationals | Netherlands | Standard and Booster Draft | 8–10 September 2006 | 5 |
| 2008 | Nationals | Netherlands | Standard and Booster Draft | 15–17 August 2008 | 4 |
| 2008 | Worlds | Memphis, Tennessee | Standard and Booster Draft | 11–14 December 2008 | 7 |
| 2016-17 | Grand Prix | Rotterdam | Team Limited | 12–13 November 2016 | 2 |

Last updated: 3 December 2016
Source: Wizards.com

Other accomplishments

- Magic: The Gathering Hall of Fame class of 2009

| Preceded by Raymond Veenis | Dutch National Champion; 2014 | Succeeded by Jelger Wiegersma |
