= Antoine Ruel =

French Magic: The Gathering player

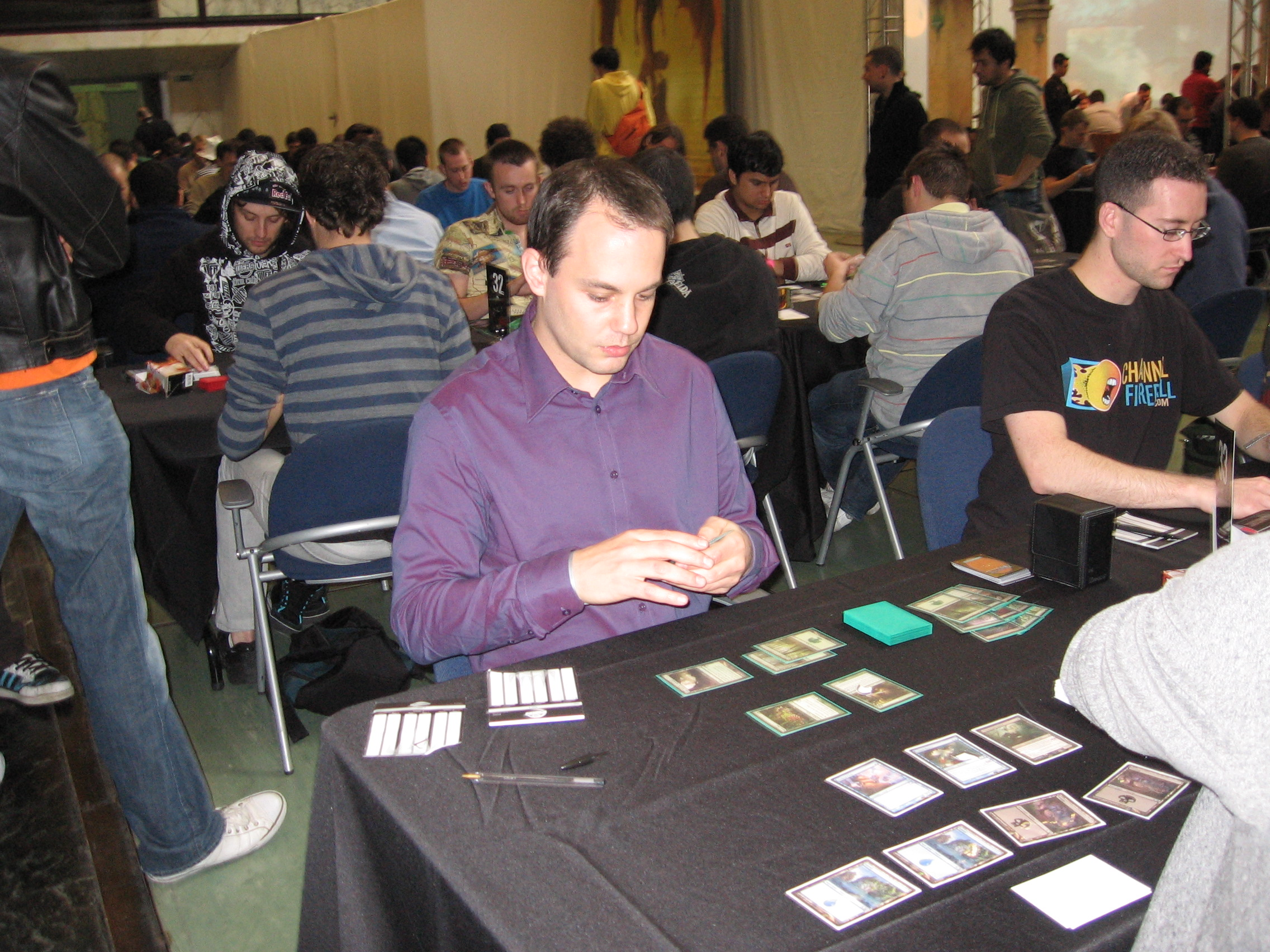
- Born: 31 October 1979 (age 45); Aubervilliers, France
- Nationality: (France) French
- Pro Tour debut: Pro Tour Washington D.C. 1999
- Winnings: $239,640
- Pro Tour wins (Top 8): 1 (4)
- Grand Prix wins (Top 8): 2 (18)
- Median Pro Tour Finish: 113
- Lifetime Pro Points: 403
- Planeswalker Level: 50 (Archmage)

Antoine Ruel (born 31 October 1979) is a French professional Magic: The Gathering player. He has reached the top eight at the Pro Tour four times, including a win in Los Angeles in 2005. With eighteen Grand Prix top eights, he is among the most successful Grand Prix players of all time. In 2009, Ruel joined his brother Olivier in the Magic: The Gathering Hall of Fame.

== Career ==
Born in Aubervilliers, France, Antoine and his brother Olivier started playing Magic in 1994. In the 1999-2000 Pro Tour season, he first began to attract attention in the new teams format alongside his brother and Florent Jeudon. As Phenomène J, they finished eleventh at the first teams Pro Tour in Washington, D.C., and followed with a win and Grand Prix Cannes under the name Black Ops. These two finishes qualified the three Frenchmen for a special event called the Magic: The Gathering Team Challenge. The event featured some very prominent players, with seven of the twelve players involved being future members of the Hall of Fame. Black Ops won the event, with Antoine defeating Jon Finkel in the final.

Antoine's first major individual success followed soon after. In September 2000, he won Grand Prix Porto defeating his brother in final. At the 2001 World Championships, Antoine had his first breakthrough at the Pro Tour level with a third-place finish. Although, his next high finish at the Pro Tour would not come until 2004, Antoine would continue to make top eight appearances at the Grand Prix Level. In 2004, he made the finals of Pro Tour San Diego, losing to Nicolai Herzog for whom it was the second Pro Tour win that season. The following year, Antoine won Pro Tour Los Angeles taking out Japanese giants Tsuyoshi Fujita and Kenji Tsumura in the quarter- and semifinals respectively. The semifinal match is known for a well played bluff on the part Antoine. He would then go on to sweep American Billy Moreno in the finals in three games. In 2005, he reached the top eight of Pro Tour Honolulu with his brother, making it the first time that brothers had reached the top eight of an individual Pro Tour together. Antoine would lose the quarterfinals to Craig Jones in what has been described as "the most lopsided match in the history of Pro Tour top eights."

In 2009, Antoine was inducted into the Hall of Fame, alongside Dutch players Frank Karsten and Kamiel Cornelissen.

== Accomplishments ==
=== Top 8 Appearances ===
Season	Event type	Location	Format	Date	Rank
1999–00	Grand Prix	Cannes	Team Limited	26–27 February 2000	1
1999–00	Masters	New York	Team Limited	16 April 2000	1
2000–01	Grand Prix	Porto	Rochester Draft	23–24 September 2000	1
2000–01	Grand Prix	Amsterdam	Limited	13–14 January 2001	6
2000–01	Grand Prix	Cologne	Limited	24–25 February 2001	2
2000–01	Grand Prix	Prague	Limited	10–11 March 2001	6
2000–01	Grand Prix	Moscow	Standard	21–22 April 2001	4
2000–01	Worlds	Toronto	Special	8–12 August 2001	3
2001–02	Grand Prix	London	Block Constructed	1–2 September 2001	7
2001–02	Grand Prix	Curitiba	Extended	8–9 December 2001	3
2001–02	Grand Prix	Sao Paulo	Standard	13–14 July 2002	3
2002–03	Grand Prix	Sevilla	Sealed and Booster Draft	22–23 February 2003	4
2003–04	Grand Prix	Sendai	Booster Draft	20–21 March 2004	3
2003–04	Pro Tour	San Diego	Booster Draft	14–16 May 2004	2
2005	Grand Prix	Vienna	Rochester Draft	9–10 October 2004	2
2005	Invitational	Los Angeles	Special	17–20 May 2005	6
2005	Pro Tour	Los Angeles	Extended	28–30 October 2005	1
2006	Invitational	Los Angeles	Special	10–12 May 2006	1
2006	Pro Tour	Honolulu	Standard	3–5 March 2006	8
2006	Grand Prix	Cardiff	Sealed and Booster Draft	25–26 March 2006	8
2006	Grand Prix	Turin	Sealed and Booster Draft	3–4 June 2006	2
2006	Grand Prix	Athens	Sealed and Booster Draft	14–15 October 2006	6
2006	Grand Prix	Yamagata	Sealed and Booster Draft	18–19 November 2006	6
2007	Grand Prix	Singapore	Extended	3–4 March 2007	3
2007	Invitational	Essen	Special	18–21 October 2007	3
2008	Grand Prix	Brussels	Sealed and Booster Draft	3–4 May 2008	4
2010	Nationals	Reims	Standard and Booster Draft	24–25 July 2010	3

Last updated: 10 August 2009
Source: wizards.com

=== Other accomplishments ===
- Inducted into the Hall of Fame in 2009
