= Shuhei Nakamura =

Japanese Magic: The Gathering player (born 1981)

Shuhei Nakamura 中村 修平
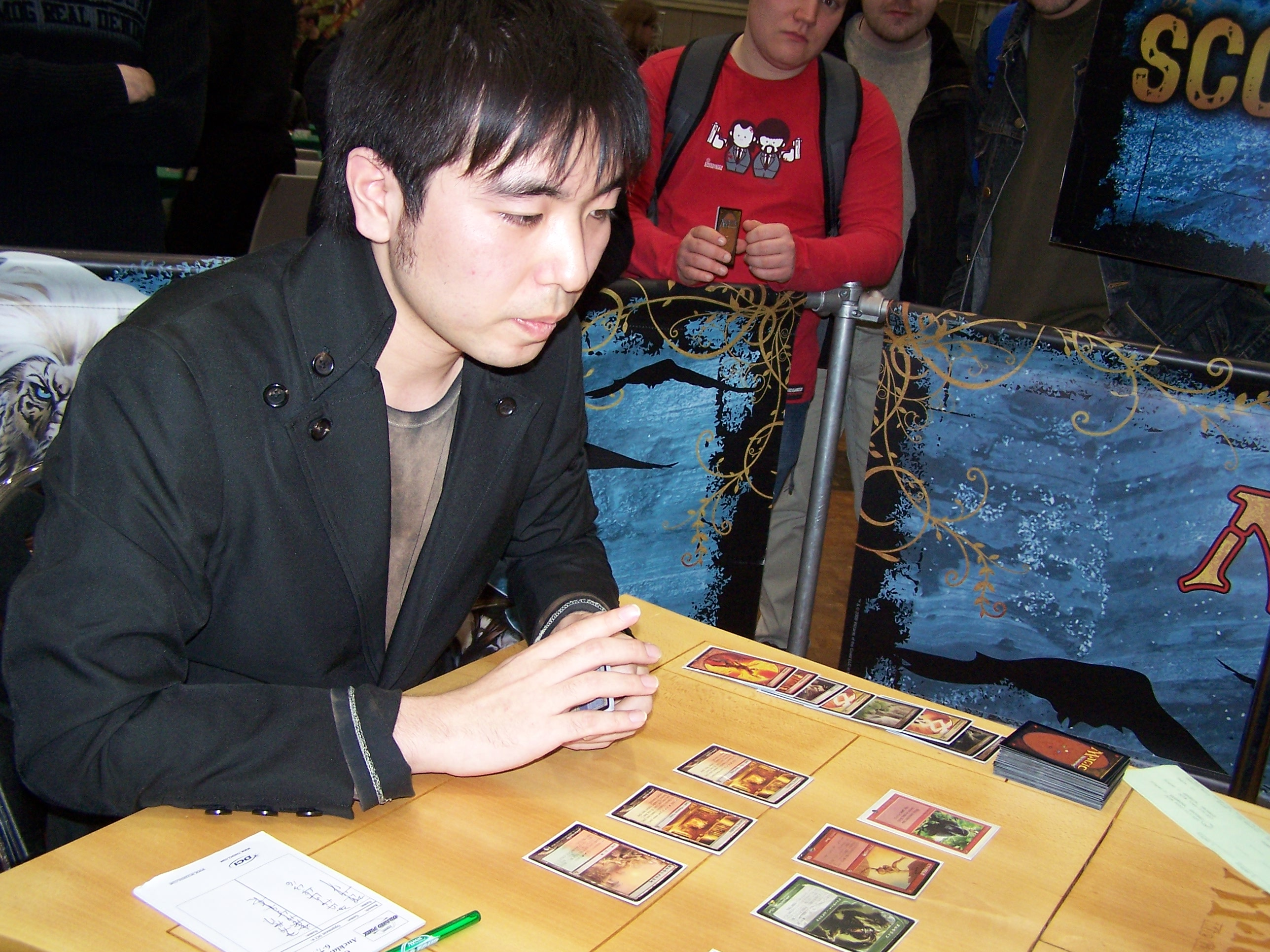
- Born: 3 November 1981 (age 45); Osaka, Japan
- Nationality: (Japan) Japanese
- Pro Tour debut: 2002 Pro Tour San Diego
- Winnings: $397,400
- Pro Tour wins (Top 8): 0 (6)
- Grand Prix wins (Top 8): 7 (27)
- Lifetime Pro Points: 595
- Planeswalker Level: 50 (Archmage)

Shuhei Nakamura (中村 修平, Nakamura Shūhei; born 3 November 1981) is a Japanese Magic: The Gathering player. He has reached the Top 8 of six Pro Tours and won seven Grands Prix, as well as being the 2008 Pro Player of the Year. In 2011, he was inducted into the Magic: The Gathering Hall of Fame and is considered one of the most successful professional players.

== Career ==
Nakamura's first success came in a second place at Grand Prix Kobe in 2001. This qualified him for Pro Tour New Orleans. However, he chose not to attend. In January 2002 he played his first Pro Tour in San Diego.

Managing several Top 8 at Japanese Grand Prix, a Top 8 appearance at Pro Tour Columbus in 2005 was his first major showing on the Pro Tour. He followed this finish with another Top 8 at the World Championship the same season. Ultimately, Nakamura would finish fourth in the Player of the Year standings with 66 Pro Points.

In 2006 Nakamura achieved several high finishes at Limited events, including third places at PT Prague and GP Toulouse. Eventually he also won his first major tournament, Grand Prix St. Louis 2006, immediately backing up the victory by winning the next Grand Prix event in Hiroshima four weeks later. As both of his Grand Prix wins were in the Coldsnap limited format, Shuhei earned the nickname 'Snowmaster'. Nakamura gained 56 Pro Points throughout the season placing him second in the 2006 Player of the Year Race, only four points behind winner Shouta Yasooka.

The 2007 season was not quite as successful for Nakamura, however, he did manage to make his fourth Pro Tour Top 8 appearance at PT Valencia.

The 2008 season started off perfect with a victory in the first professional tournament of the season, Grand Prix Stuttgart. This victory made him only the third player to have won a Grand Prix in Europe, Asia, and North America. Nakamura proceeded to manage Top 4 finishes at Pro Tour Hollywood, Grand Prix Copenhagen, and Grand Prix Rimini. He finished the season with 70 Pro Points to become Pro Player of the Year. Nakamura was the fourth of five Japanese players to win the Player of the Year title in a row, preceded by Kenji Tsumura, Shouta Yasooka, Tomoharu Saito and followed by Yuuya Watanabe. Nakamura has personally referred to this period as a 'golden age' for Magic in Japan.

In 2009 Nakamura finished third at Grand Prix Rotterdam in February, but achieved no further final eight appearances until his victory at the Japanese Nationals in July.

On 19 August 2011 it was announced that Nakamura will be inducted into the Magic: The Gathering Hall of Fame along with Steven O'Mahoney-Schwartz and Anton Jonsson. The ceremony took place on 17 November at the 2011 Magic: The Gathering World Championship.

In the 2012 season, Shuhei placed tenth in the Pro Players Club Standings at the end of the season with 51 Pro Points. This performance earned Nakamura an invite to the inaugural 2012 Magic Players Championship. Shuhei would take fifth place at the inaugural event, narrowly missing the cut to Top 4.

== Accomplishments ==
| Season | Event type | Location | Format | Date | Rank |
|---|---|---|---|---|---|
| 2001–02 | Grand Prix | Kobe | Block Constructed | 18–19 August 2001 | 2 |
| 2001–02 | Grand Prix | Fukuoka | Limited | 16–17 February 2002 | 8 |
| 2001–02 | Grand Prix | Nagoya | Team Limited | 11–12 May 2002 | 2 |
| 2002–03 | Grand Prix | Utsunomiya | Limited | 12–13 October 2002 | 2 |
| 2003–04 | Nationals | Osaka | Special | 11–13 June 2004 | 4 |
| 2003–04 | Grand Prix | Yokohama | Block Constructed | 23–24 August 2004 | 6 |
| 2005 | Pro Tour | Columbus, Ohio | Extended | 29–31 October 2004 | 2 |
| 2005 | Grand Prix | Seattle | Extended | 5–6 March 2005 | 3 |
| 2005 | Grand Prix | Matsuyama | Limited | 14–15 May 2005 | 6 |
| 2005 | Worlds | Yokohama | Special | 30 November – 4 December 2005 | 5 |
| 2006 | Pro Tour | Prague | Limited | 5–7 May 2006 | 3 |
| 2006 | Grand Prix | Toulouse | Limited | 24–25 June 2006 | 3 |
| 2006 | Grand Prix | St. Louis | Limited | 22–23 July 2006 | 1 |
| 2006 | Grand Prix | Hiroshima | Limited | 19–20 August 2006 | 1 |
| 2007 | Pro Tour | Valencia, Spain | Extended | 12–14 October 2007 | 4 |
| 2007 | Invitational | Essen | Special | 18–21 October 2007 | 6 |
| 2008 | Grand Prix | Stuttgart | Limited | 15–16 December 2007 | 1 |
| 2008 | Pro Tour | Hollywood | Standard | 23–25 May 2008 | 3 |
| 2008 | Grand Prix | Copenhagen | Standard | 23–24 August 2008 | 4 |
| 2008 | Grand Prix | Rimini | Block Constructed | 13–14 September 2008 | 2 |
| 2009 | Grand Prix | Rotterdam | Limited | 21–22 February 2009 | 3 |
| 2009 | Nationals | Hiroshima | Standard and Booster Draft | 18–20 July 2009 | 1 |
| 2010 | Grand Prix | Houston | Extended | 3–4 April 2010 | 5 |
| 2010 | Grand Prix | Florence | Sealed and Booster Draft | 27–28 November 2010 | 3 |
| 2011 | Grand Prix | Prague | Sealed and Booster Draft | 21–22 May 2011 | 3 |
| 2012 | Grand Prix | Nashville | Sealed and Booster Draft | 17–18 March 2012 | 8 |
| 2012–13 | Grand Prix | San Jose, Costa Rica | Sealed and Booster Draft | 15–16 September 2012 | 1 |
| 2012–13 | Grand Prix | Philadelphia | Sealed and Booster Draft | 27–28 October 2012 | 1 |
| 2013–14 | Grand Prix | Providence | Team Limited | 8–9 June 2013 | 4 |
| 2013–14 | Grand Prix | Houston | Sealed and Booster Draft | 15–16 June 2013 | 7 |
| 2013–14 | Grand Prix | Hong Kong | Sealed and Booster Draft | 19–20 October 2013 | 1 |
| 2013–14 | Grand Prix | Beijing | Standard | 29–30 March 2014 | 5 |
| 2014–15 | Grand Prix | Shanghai | Sealed and Booster Draft | 4–5 October 2014 | 5 |
| 2014–15 | Grand Prix | Dallas/Fort Worth | Sealed and Booster Draft | 25–26 July 2015 | 1 |
| 2015–16 | Grand Prix | Kobe | Standard | 21–22 November 2015 | 8 |
| 2015–16 | Pro Tour | Atlanta | Modern and Booster Draft | 5–7 February 2016 | 5 |

Last updated: 7 February 2016
Source: Event Coverage Archive at Wizards.com

Other accomplishments

- 2008 Pro Player of the Year
- 2011 Hall of Fame class (vote leader)
- Most Grand Prix wins (7), tied with Kai Budde and Yuuya Watanabe

| Preceded by (Japan) Tomoharu Saitou | Pro Player of the Year; 2008 | Succeeded by (Japan) Yuuya Watanabe |
| Preceded by Masashi Oiso | Magic Japanese National Champion; 2009 | Succeeded by Katsuhiro Mori |
