= Makihito Mihara =

Japanese Magic: The Gathering player

Makihito Mihara 三原槙仁
- Nationality: (Japan) Japanese
- Pro Tour debut: 2003 Pro Tour Venice
- Winnings: $196,700
- Pro Tour wins (Top 8): 1 (5)
- Grand Prix wins (Top 8): 2 (10)
- Lifetime Pro Points: 378
- Planeswalker Level: 48 (Archmage)

Makihito Mihara (三原槙仁) is a Japanese Magic: The Gathering player best known for winning the 2006 World Championship, 2011 Team World Championship and being inducted into the 2014 Hall of Fame. Mihara's resume includes four more Pro Tour top eights, and eight Grand Prix top eights, including two wins.

== Career ==
Mihara's Pro Tour career began at Pro Tour Venice in 2003. Over the three years that followed, he played a number of Pro Tours, but without much success; his best finish being a 53rd place at Pro Tour Kobe. Mihara first came to prominence at the end of the 2005 season, with a Grand Prix top eight in Kitakyuushuu, a top eight that featured seven other players who had all made the top eight of a Pro Tour before. The following season, Mihara managed to establish himself on the Pro Tour, playing all five events and designing the CAL, one of the major decks in extended. Mihara's breakout performance came at that year's World Championship in Paris. After three days of competition, Mihara was in seventh place, and in the quarterfinals of a Pro Tour for the first time. In the quarterfinal, Mihara played Paulo Vitor Damo da Rosa, and almost lost the match to misplays, but managed to draw the exact sequence of cards he needed to win. Mihara's semifinal opponent, Gabriel Nassif, was considered to be a heavy favourite in the match, but Mihara managed the upset in five games. In the final, he played Ryo Ogura. Mihara handily defeated his countryman without losing a single game. The following season, work commitments meant Mihara could not play as many events, but he made the most of the ones he did attend. After a sixteenth-place finish in Geneva, Mihara returned to the top eight at Pro Tour Valencia. Mihara was unable to duplicate his success from the World Championship, and lost in the quarterfinals to Giulio Barra by three games to zero. Mihara rounded out his season with an eighteenth-place finish at the World Championship, to finish the season on 32 pro points. After an unimpressive 152nd-place finish in Kuala Lumpur, Mihara made his third Pro Tour top eight at Pro Tour Hollywood 2008. Like in Valencia the previous year, Mihara's tournament ended in the quarterfinals, losing to Jan Ruess in five games. Although unable to impress on tour, his best finish being a 113th place, Mihara did manage a strong finish off Tour, winning Grand Prix Okayama. The 2009 season was somewhat of an off year for Mihara. While he did not put up any top eights on the Pro Tour or Grand Prix level, he did earn enough points to remain qualified. His only top eight since then was a 2nd-place finish at Grand Prix Sendai 2010, losing to Brian Kibler in the finals. Later that season, Mihara finished third at Japanese nationals earning a spot on the Japanese national team, alongside Ryuuichirou Ishida and Tamoya Fujimoto. At worlds, the Japanese team won the team competition, making Mihara only the fourth player to win both individual and team world titles.

== Achievements ==
Season	Event type	Location	Format	Date	Rank
2002–03	Nationals	Tokyo	Special	20–22 June 2003	8
2003–04	Nationals	Osaka	Special	11–13 June 2004	7
2005	Nationals	Yokohama	Special	2–4 September 2005	5
2005	Grand Prix	Kitakyuushuu	Extended	5–6 November 2005	3
2006	Worlds	Paris	Special	29 November – 3 December 2006	1
2007	Pro Tour	Valencia	Extended	12–14 October 2007	8
2008	Pro Tour	Hollywood	Standard	23–25 May 2008	7
2008	Nationals	Yokohama	Special	19–21 September 2008	5
2008	Grand Prix	Okayama	Sealed and Booster Draft	22–23 November 2008	1
2010	Grand Prix	Sendai	Standard	5–6 June 2010	2
2011	Grand Prix	Kobe	Extended	23–24 April 2011	2
2011	Nationals	Osaka	Special	16–18 July 2011	3
2011	Worlds	San Francisco	National team	17–20 November 2011	1
2012–13	Grand Prix	Taipei	Sealed and Booster Draft	24–25 November 2012	1
2012–13	Grand Prix	Yokohama	Sealed and Booster Draft	2–3 March 2013	4
2012–13	Pro Tour	San Diego	Block Constructed and Booster Draft	17–19 May 2013	3
2013–14	Pro Tour	Dublin	Standard and Booster Draft	11–13 October 2013	4
2013–14	Grand Prix	Kyoto	Team Limited	23–24 November 2013	2
2014–15	Grand Prix	Manila	Standard	3–4 January 2015	4
2015–16	Grand Prix	Beijing	Team Limited	24–25 October 2015	2
2015–16	Grand Prix	Beijing	Limited	16–17 April 2016	5

Last updated: 19 April 2016
Source: Wizards.com

Preceded by (Japan) Katsuhiro Mori	Magic World Champion; 2006	Succeeded by (Israel) Uri Peleg
Preceded by (Slovakia) Slovakia; Ivan Floch; Robert Jurkovic; Patrik Surab	Magic: The Gathering Team World Champion; With: Ryuichiro Ishida; Tomoya Fujimoto 2011	Succeeded by Taiwan; Kuo Tzu-Ching; Tung-Yi Cheng; Yu Min Yang; Paul Renie
