= Katsuhiro Mori =

Japanese Magic: The Gathering player (born 1983)

Katsuhiro Mori 森 勝洋
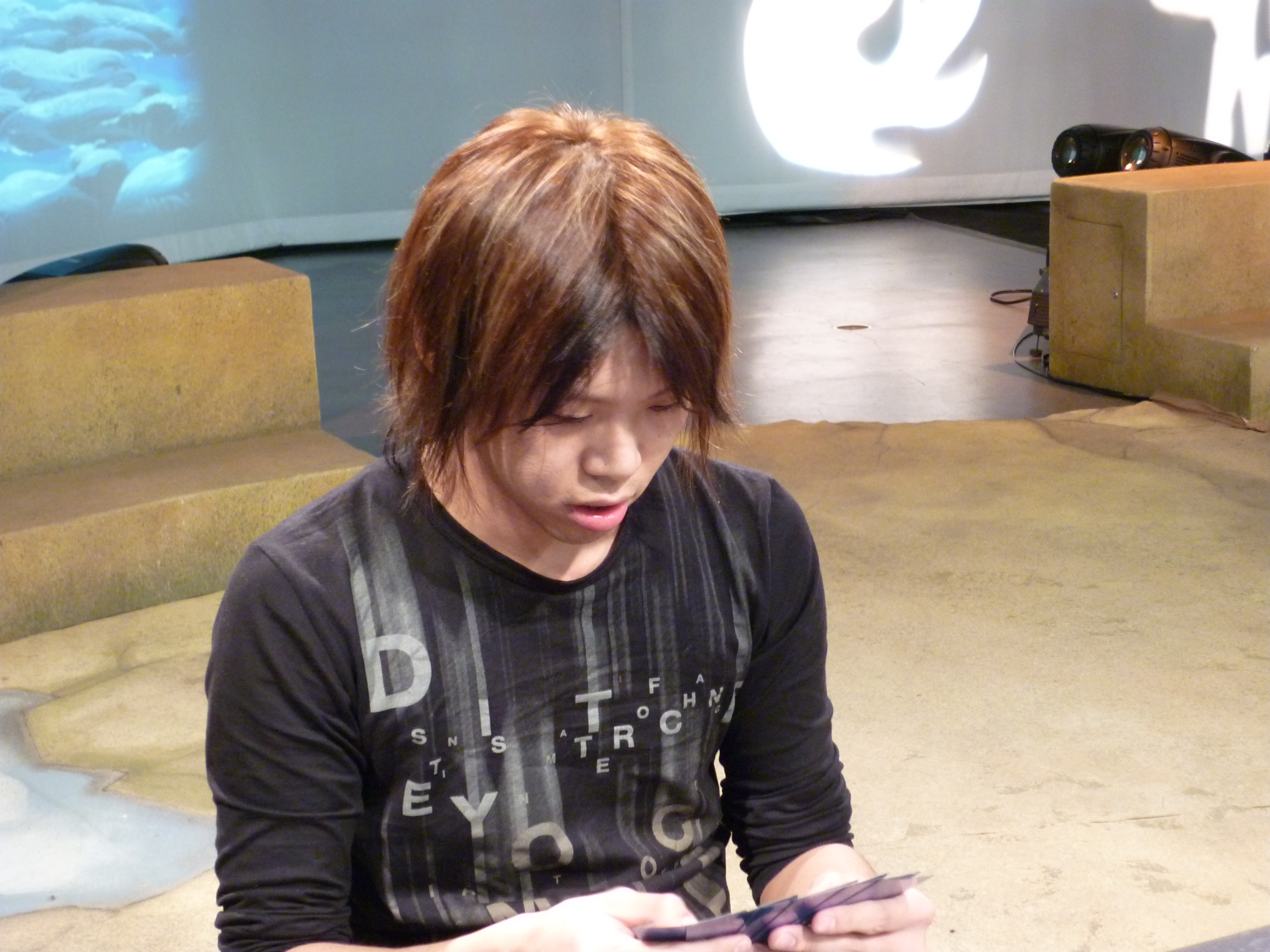
- Born: 22 February 1983
- Nationality: (Japan) Japanese
- Pro Tour debut: 2001 Pro Tour Los Angeles
- Winnings: US$176,275
- Pro Tour wins (Top 8): 1 (3)
- Grand Prix wins (Top 8): 4 (15)
- Lifetime Pro Points: 298
- Planeswalker Level: 48 (Archmage)

Katsuhiro Mori (森 勝洋) is a Japanese Magic: The Gathering player. He is the most successful player in the individual portion of World Championships, winning one tournament and making the top eight of two others.

== Career ==
Mori first appeared on the Pro Tour in the 2000–01 season, at Pro Tour Los Angeles. With three Grand Prix top eights and a ninth-place finish at the World Championship, he accumulated enough points to win the rookie of the year title that season. The following season Mori's success abated as he was unable to repeat his strong performance from the previous Worlds at the Pro Tour level. However, he did manage to make a number of Grand Prix top eights. In 2002–03, Mori played only one Pro Tour, Venice. While his finish at the tournament was mediocre, with his teammates Masashiro Kuroda and Masahiko Morita, he won the penultimate Masters Series, also held in Venice on the same weekend. The following season Mori failed to make the top eight of any premier event, although he did come close with a tenth-place finish at Pro Tour Kobe. In 2005, Mori played every Pro Tour but again failed to make a top 8 until the final event of the season, the World Championship. Beating Shuhei Nakamura, Tomohiro Kaji, and Frank Karsten, Mori won the tournament and became the 2005 World Champion. Another top eight appearance at the next World Championship made him the first World Champion to make it back to the top eight of a World Championship after his win. He also captained the Japanese national team to a second-place finish. The following year came to solid start for Mori. He finished ninth at Pro Tour Geneva. However, he was given a six-month suspension for accumulated game play warnings after the following event. In spite of this, Mori made his third, and to date final, Pro Tour Top eight at the World Championship that year. He lost in the quarterfinal to the eventual champion Uri Peleg.

== Accomplishments ==
Season	Event type	Location	Format	Date	Rank
1999–00	Nationals	Tokyo	Special	27–28 May 2000	8
2000–01	Grand Prix	Sapporo	Sealed and Booster Draft	23–24 September 2000	7
2000–01	Grand Prix	Hiroshima	Sealed and Booster Draft	27–28 January 2001	5
2000–01	APAC Region Championship	Kuala Lumpur	Special	22–24 June 2001	3
2000–01	Grand Prix	Taipei	Team Limited	21–22 July 2001	2
2001–02	Grand Prix	Shizuoka, Shizuoka	Sealed and Booster Draft	13–14 October 2001	5
2001–02	Grand Prix	Sendai	Extended	15–16 December 2001	8
2001–02	Grand Prix	Nagoya	Team Limited	11–12 March 2002	1
2002–03	Masters	Venice	Team Limited	20–23 March 2003	1
2005	Grand Prix	Osaka	Team Limited	8–9 January 2005	1
2005	Grand Prix	Niigata, Niigata	Block Constructed	23–24 July 2005	1
2005	Grand Prix	Beijing	Extended	26–27 November 2005	4
2005	Worlds	Yokohama	Special	30 November–4 December 2005	1
2006	Nationals	Tokyo	Special	25–27 August 2006	1
2006	Grand Prix	Yamagata	Sealed and Booster Draft	18–19 November 2006	4
2006	Worlds	Paris	Special	29 November–3 December 2006	8
2006	Worlds	Paris	National team	29 November–3 December 2006	2
2007	Worlds	New York	Special	6–9 December 2007	7
2009	Grand Prix	Kitakyushu	Sealed and Booster Draft	31 October–1 November 2009	6
2010	Grand Prix	Yokohama	Extended	20–21 March 2010	1
2010	Nationals	Kyoto	Standard and Booster Draft	2–4 July 2010	1
2012	Grand Prix	Kobe	Sealed and Booster Draft	18–19 February 2012	5
2013–14	Grand Prix	Kyoto	Team Limited	23–24 November 2013	4
2014–15	Grand Prix	Chiba	Sealed and Booster Draft	30–31 May 2015	4

Last updated: 29 June 2015
Source: Wizards.com

Preceded by (United States) Brian Davis	Magic: The Gathering Rookie of the Year; 2001	Succeeded by (France) Farid Meraghni
Preceded by (Netherlands) Julien Nuijten	Magic: The Gathering World Champion; 2005	Succeeded by (Japan) Makihito Mihara
Preceded by Takuma Morofuji	Magic Japanese National Champion; 2006	Succeeded by Masaya Kitayama
Preceded by Shuhei Nakamura	Magic Japanese National Champion; 2010	Succeeded by Ryuuichirou Ishida
