= Magic: The Gathering Pro Tour season 2011 =

2011 Pro Tour season
- Pro Player of the Year: (United States) Owen Turtenwald
- Rookie of the Year: (United States) Matthias Hunt
- World Champion: (Japan) Jun'ya Iyanaga
- Pro Tours: 4
- Grands Prix: 20
- Hall of Fame inductions: (Japan) Shuhei Nakamura (Sweden) Anton Jonsson (United States) Steven O'Mahoney-Schwartz
- Start of season: 22 January 2011
- End of season: 20 November 2011

The 2011 Pro Tour season was the sixteenth season of the Magic: The Gathering Pro Tour. It began on 22 January 2011 with Grand Prix Atlanta, and ended on 20 November 2011 with the conclusion of the 2011 World Championship in San Francisco. The season consisted of twenty Grands Prix, and four Pro Tours, located in Paris, Nagoya, Philadelphia, and San Francisco.

== Mode ==
Four Pro Tours and eighteen Grands Prix were held in the 2011 season. Further Pro Points were awarded at national championships. These Pro Points were mainly used to determine the Pro Player club levels of players participating in these events, but also decide which player was awarded the Pro Player of the year title at the end of the season. Based on final standings Pro Points are awarded as follows:

Rank	Pro Points awarded at			
Rank	Pro Tour	Grand Prix	Nationals	Worlds (Team)
1	25	10	10	6
2	20	8	8	5
3–4	16	6	6	4
5–8	12	5	4	3
9–12	8	4	2	2
13–16	8	3	1	1
17–24	7	2		
25–32	6	2		
33–64	5	1		
65–100	4			
101–200	3			
201+	2			

== Grand Prix: Atlanta ==
GP Atlanta (22–23 January 2011)

- Format: Extended
- Attendance: 1223
1. (United States) Jason Ford
2. (United States) Ben Stark
3. (United States) Jody Keith
4. (United States) Christian Valenti
5. (United States) Ari Lax
6. (United States) John Runyon
7. (United States) Charles Gindy
8. (United States) Owen Turtenwald

== Pro Tour – Paris (10–13 February 2011) ==
Pro Tour Paris was held at Espace Champerret. The formats were Standard and Scars of Mirrodin-Mirrodin Besieged Booster Draft.

=== Tournament data ===
Prize pool: $230,795
Format: Standard, Booster Draft

=== Top 8 ===
Quarter-finals
1	Vincent Lemoine	3
8	Shintaro Ishimura	2
4	Patrick Chapin	0
5	Paul Rietzl	3
2	Nico Bohny	2
7	Naoki Nakada	3
3	Ben Stark	3
6	Tom Martell	2

Semi-finals
Vincent Lemoine	2
Paul Rietzl	3
Naoki Nakada	0
Ben Stark	3

Finals
Paul Rietzl	1
Ben Stark	3

=== Final standings ===
Place	Player	Prize	Pro Points	Comment
1	(United States) Ben Stark	$40,000	25	3rd Final day
2	(United States) Paul Rietzl	$20,000	20	3rd Final day
3	(Belgium) Vincent Lemoine	$15,000	16	
4	(Japan) Naoki Nakada	$13,000	16	
5	(Switzerland) Nico Bohny	$11,000	12	2nd Final day
6	(United States) Patrick Chapin	$10,500	12	4th Final day
7	(United States) Tom Martell	$10,000	12	
8	(Japan) Shintaro Ishimura	$9,500	12	

=== Pro Player of the year standings ===
Rank	Player	Pro Points
1	(United States) Ben Stark	33
2	(United States) Paul Rietzl	22
3	(Belgium) Vincent Lemoine	16
3	(Japan) Naoki Nakada	16
5	(United States) David Sharfman	13
5	(Germany) Christian Hüttenberger	13
5	(United States) Owen Turtenwald	13

== Grands Prix: Paris, Denver, Hamburg, Kobe, Barcelona, Dallas, London, Prague, Providence, and Singapore ==
Originally scheduled for the weekend of 12–13 March GP Hamburg was cancelled as announced on 13 January. On 14 March 2011, Wizards of the Coast announced that GP Kobe, originally scheduled for 19–20 March, had been postponed, citing safety, power and travel concerns.

GP Paris (12–13 February)

- Format: Limited
- Attendance: 2182
1. (United States) David Sharfman
2. (United States) William Lowry
3. (Germany) Christian Hüttenberger
4. (Austria) Gerald Leitzinger
5. (Germany) Kai Budde
6. (Norway) Sveinung Bjørnerud
7. (England) Lewis McLeod
8. (Greece) Dimitris Davios

GP Dallas (9–10 April)

- Format: Standard
- Attendance: 1189
1. (United States) David Shiels
2. (United States) Orrin Beasley
3. (United States) Owen Turtenwald
4. (United States) Austin Bursavich
5. (United States) Alex Bertoncini
6. (United States) Josh Utter-Leyton
7. (United States) Michael Jacob
8. (United States) Korey McDuffie

GP Prague (21–22 May)

- Format: Limited
- Attendance: 1236
1. (Czech Republic) Ondrej Baudys
2. (Czech Republic) Lukas Blohon
3. (Japan) Shuhei Nakamura
4. (Sweden) Anders Melin
5. (Czech Republic) Petr Brozek
6. (Poland) Lukasz Cichecki
7. (Sweden) Joel Larsson
8. (Slovakia) Robert Jurkovic

GP Denver (19–20 February)

- Format: Limited
- Attendance: 841
1. (United States) Gaudenis Vidugiris
2. (Czech Republic) Martin Juza
3. (United States) Owen Turtenwald
4. (Brazil) Eduardo dos Santos Vieira
5. (United States) Thomas Pannell
6. (United States) Paul Cheon
7. (United States) James Zornes
8. (United States) Brian Kibler

GP Kobe (23–24 April)

- Format: Extended
- Attendance: 710
1. (Japan) Shouta Yasooka
2. (Japan) Makihito Mihara
3. (Japan) Kenichiro Omori
4. (Japan) Shunsuke Aka
5. (Japan) Shinya Satou
6. (Japan) Shouhei Yamamoto
7. (Czech Republic) Martin Juza
8. (Japan) Kentaro Ino

GP Providence (28–29 May)

- Format: Legacy
- Attendance: 1179
1. (United States) James Rynkiewicz
2. (United States) Bryan Eleyet
3. (Brazil) Paulo Vitor Damo da Rosa
4. (United States) Reid Duke
5. (United States) Owen Turtenwald
6. (United States) Wilson Hunter
7. (United States) John Kubilis
8. (United States) Alex Majlaton

GP Barcelona (26–27 March)

- Format: Standard
- Attendance: 1201
1. (Spain) Martin Scheinin
2. (Spain) Toni Ramis Pascual
3. (England) Richard Bland
4. (United Kingdom) Eduardo Sajgalik
5. (Germany) Jonas Köstler
6. (Poland) Karol Nosowicz
7. (France) Guillaume Wafo-Tapa
8. (Greece) Simon Bertiou

GP London (30 April–1 May)

- Format: Limited
- Attendance: 709
1. (England) Daniel Royde
2. (France) Louis Deltour
3. (Sweden) Martin Lindström
4. (Italy) Gennaro Mango
5. (Germany) Raul Porojan
6. (Italy) Andra La Placa
7. (Sweden) Kenny Öberg
8. (England) Nicholas Taylor

GP Singapore (4–5 June)

- Format: Standard
- Attendance: 623
1. (Brazil) Paulo Vitor Damo da Rosa
2. (Japan) Chikara Nakahima
3. (Thailand) Chatchai Seathang
4. (United States) Owen Turtenwald
5. (Japan) Shouta Yasooka
6. (Singapore) Weng Heng Soh
7. (Taiwan) Hao-Shan Huang
8. (Greece) Marios Angelopozlos

== Pro Tour – Nagoya (10–12 June 2011) ==
Pro Tour Nagoya was held at the Trade & Industry Center. The formats are Block Constructed and Booster Draft.

=== Tournament data ===
Prize pool: $230,795
Format: Block Constructed, Booster Draft

=== Top 8 ===
Quarter-finals
6	Toshiyuki Kadooka	3
3	Luis Scott-Vargas	1
5	Pat Cox	1
4	Elie Pichon	3
2	Gaudenis Vidugiris	2
8	Fabian Thiele	3
7	David Sharfman	3
1	Tsuyoshi Fujita	0

Semi-finals
Toshiyuki Kadooka	3
Elie Pichon	0
Fabian Thiele	0
David Sharfman	3

Finals
Toshiyuki Kadooka	0
David Sharfman	3

Top 8 pairings are determined at random

=== Final standings ===
Place	Player	Prize	Pro Points	Comment
1	(United States) David Sharfman	$40,000	25	
2	(Japan) Toshiyuki Kadooka	$20,000	20	
3	(France) Elie Pichon	$15,000	16	
4	(Germany) Fabian Thiele	$13,000	16	
5	(Japan) Tsuyoshi Fujita	$11,000	12	4th final day
6	(United States) Gaudenis Vidugiris	$10,500	12	
7	(United States) Luis Scott-Vargas	$10,000	12	4th final day
8	(United States) Pat Cox	$9,500	12	

=== Pro Player of the year standings ===
Rank	Player	Pro Points
1	(United States) Ben Stark	41
2	(United States) Owen Turtenwald	40
3	(United States) David Sharfman	38
4	(Brazil) Paulo Vitor Damo da Rosa	31
5	(Czech Republic) Martin Juza	29
5	(Japan) Shouta Yasooka	29

== Grands Prix: Kansas City, Shanghai, and Pittsburgh ==
GP Kansas City (18–19 June)

- Format: Limited
- Attendance: 879
1. (United States) Luis Scott-Vargas
2. (Japan) Yuuya Watanabe
3. (United States) Tim Aten
4. (United States) Samuel Friedman
5. (United States) Zach Jesse
6. (United States) Gregory Jolin
7. (United States) Matthew Costa
8. (Brazil) Willy Edel

GP Shanghai (20–21 August)

- Format: Limited
- Attendance: 633
1. (Japan) Yuuya Watanabe
2. (Japan) Ryouta Endou
3. (China) Zhiyang Zhang
4. (Japan) Kentarou Ino
5. (China) Kuang Chen
6. (Japan) Kentarou Nonaka
7. (Canada) Daniel Pham
8. (China) Bin Xu

GP Pittsburgh (27–28 August)

- Format: Standard
- Attendance: 1435
1. (Japan) Yuuya Watanabe
2. (Poland) Lukasz Musial
3. (United States) Patrick Chapin
4. (United States) Max Tietze
5. (Sweden) Joel Larsson
6. (United States) Matthew Nass
7. (Germany) Florian Pils
8. (United States) Harry Corvese

== Pro Tour – Philadelphia (2–4 September 2011) ==
Pro Tour Philadelphia was held at the Philadelphia Convention Center. The formats were initially announced to be Extended and Booster Draft. Three weeks before the event it was announced that the Extended portion would be replaced by Modern. The winner of the tournament was Samuel Estratti, who became the first Modern Pro Tour Champion and the first Italian player to win a Pro Tour.

=== Tournament data ===
Prize pool: $230,795
Players: 417
Format: Modern, Booster Draft
Headjudge: Riccardo Tessitori

=== Top 8 ===
Quarter-finals
6	Alessandro Portaro	1
3	Josh Utter-Leyton	3
7	Samuel Black	3
2	Jesse Hampton	1
5	Samuele Estratti	3
4	Andrejs Prost	1
8	Chikara Nakajima	3
1	Max Sjöblom	1

Semi-finals
Josh Utter-Leyton	3
Samuel Black	2
Samuele Estratti	3
Chikara Nakajima	1

Finals
Josh Utter-Leyton	1
Samuele Estratti	3

=== Final standings ===
Place	Player	Prize	Pro Points	Comment
1	(Italy) Samuele Estratti	$40,000	25	
2	(United States) Josh Utter-Leyton	$20,000	20	2nd Final Day
3	(United States) Samuel Black	$15,000	16	
4	(Japan) Chikara Nakajima	$13,000	16	2nd Final Day
5	(Finland) Max Sjöblom	$11,000	12	
6	(United States) Jesse Hampton	$10,500	12	
7	(United States) Andrejs Prost	$10,000	12	
8	(Italy) Alessandro Portaro	$9,500	12	

=== Pro Player of the year standings ===
Rank	Player	Pro Points
1	(United States) Owen Turtenwald	48
2	(United States) Luis Scott-Vargas	45
3	(United States) Ben Stark	44
3	(Japan) Yuuya Watanabe	44
5	(United States) David Sharfman	40

== Grands Prix: Montreal, Milan, Brisbane, Amsterdam, Santiago, Hiroshima, and San Diego ==
GP Montreal (17–18 September)

- Format: Limited
- Attendance: 1054
1. (Canada) Richard Hoaen
2. (Canada) Alexander Hayne
3. (Germany) Lino Burgold
4. (Canada) Andrew Noworaj
5. (United States) Reid Duke
6. (United States) Alex West
7. (United States) Michael Holden
8. (United States) Matthew Costa

GP Amsterdam (22–23 October)

- Format: Legacy
- Attendance: 1878
1. (France) Pierre Sommen
2. (Italy) Ciro Bonaventura
3. (Germany) Christof Kovacs
4. (France) Elie Pichon
5. (Germany) Fabian Görzgen
6. (Poland) Maciej Pasek
7. (Denmark) Kim Grymer
8. (Italy) Paolo Pavesi

GP San Diego (12–13 November)

- Format: Limited
- Attendance: 1045
1. (United States) Shahar Shenhar
2. (England) Richard Bland
3. (United States) Ricky Sidher
4. (United States) Lokman Chen
5. (Sweden) Elias Watsfeldt
6. (United States) Owen Turtenwald
7. (United States) Aaron Cheng
8. (United States) Alexander West

GP Milan (8–9 October)

- Format: Limited
- Attendance: 1790
1. (Italy) Marco Ricci
2. (France) Raphaël Lévy
3. (Italy) Samuele Estratti
4. (Italy) Davide Vergoni
5. (Romania) Alexandru Dimitriu
6. (Italy) Marcello Calvetto
7. (Belgium) Michael Milis
8. (Germany) Jörg Unfried

GP Santiago (22–23 October)

- Format: Limited
- Attendance: 737
1. (Brazil) Igor Silva Pinto
2. (Chile) Carlos Iturra
3. (United States) Owen Turtenwald
4. (United States) Melissa DeTora
5. (Czech Republic) Martin Juza
6. (Brazil) Paulo Vitor Damo da Rosa
7. (Chile) David Kaliski
8. (Argentina) Martin Lecce

GP Brisbane (15–16 October)

- Format: Standard
- Attendance: 389
1. (Australia) Jeremy Neeman
2. (Australia) Tim Fondum
3. (Australia) Andreas Pranoto
4. (Australia) Luke Mulcahy
5. (Taiwan) Hao-Shan Huang
6. (Australia) Jacky Zhang
7. (Australia) Daniel Unwin
8. (Japan) Shouta Yasooka

GP Hiroshima (29–30 October)

- Format: Standard
- Attendance: 796
1. (Czech Republic) Martin Juza
2. (Japan) Takahiro Shiraki
3. (Japan) Akira Asahara
4. (Japan) Rin Satou
5. (Japan) Kouichi Tashiro
6. (Japan) Hiroshi Onizuka
7. (Japan) Naoki Obayashi
8. (Japan) Kouichi Tanaka

== 2011 World Championships – San Francisco (17–20 November 2011) ==
The 18th Magic World Championships was held in the Fort Mason Center in San Francisco, United States.

=== Tournament data ===
Prize pool: $245,245 (individual) + ? (teams)
Players: 375 from 60 countries
Formats: Standard, Booster Draft, Modern
Team Formats: Standard, Modern, Legacy
Head Judge: Sheldon Menery

=== Top 8 ===
Quarter-finals
1	Conley Woods	3
8	Craig Wescoe	2
4	Jun'ya Iyanaga	3
5	Josh Utter-Leyton	1
2	Paulo Vitor Damo da Rosa	1
7	David Caplan	3
3	Luis Scott-Vargas	2
6	Richard Bland	3

Semi-finals
Conley Woods	0
Jun'ya Iyanaga	3
David Caplan	0
Richard Bland	3

Finals
Jun'ya Iyanaga	3
Richard Bland	0

=== Final standings ===
Place	Player	Prize	Pro Points	Comment
1	(Japan) Jun'ya Iyanaga	$45,000	25	
2	(England) Richard Bland	$24,000	20	
3	(United States) Conley Woods	$15,000	16	2nd final day
4	(Canada) David Caplan	$14,000	16	
5	(Brazil) Paulo Vitor Damo da Rosa	$11,000	12	8th final day
6	(United States) Luis Scott-Vargas	$10,500	12	5th final day
7	(United States) Josh Utter-Leyton	$10,000	12	3rd final day
8	(United States) Craig Wescoe	$9,500	12	2nd final day

=== Team competition ===
1. Japan — Ryuuichirou Ishida, Makihito Mihara, Tomoya Fujimoto
2. Norway — Sveinung Bjørnerud, Kristoffer Jonassen, Andreas Nordahl

== Pro Player of the Year final standings ==
Rank	Player	Pro Points
1	(United States) Owen Turtenwald	64
2	(United States) Luis Scott-Vargas	61
3	(Czech Republic) Martin Juza	56
3	(United States) Ben Stark	56
5	(Brazil) Paulo Vitor Damo da Rosa	53
5	(Japan) Shuhei Nakamura	53
7	(United States) Josh Utter-Leyton	52
7	(Japan) Yuuya Watanabe	52
7	(Japan) Shouta Yasooka	52

== Performance by country ==
Country	T8	Q	Q/T8	GT	Best Player (PPts)
United States	16	521	33	39	Owen Turtenwald (64)
Japan	6	140	23	9	Shuhei Nakamura (53)
Italy	2	60	30	2	Samuele Estratti (38)
Germany	1	88	88	4	Fabian Thiele (30)
France	1	91	91	2	Raphaël Lévy (40)
Belgium	1	32	32	1	Vincent Lemoine (40)
Brazil	1	27	27	1	Paulo Vitor Damo da Rosa (53)
