= Tomoharu Saitou =

Magic: The Gathering player

Tomoharu Saitou 齋藤 友晴
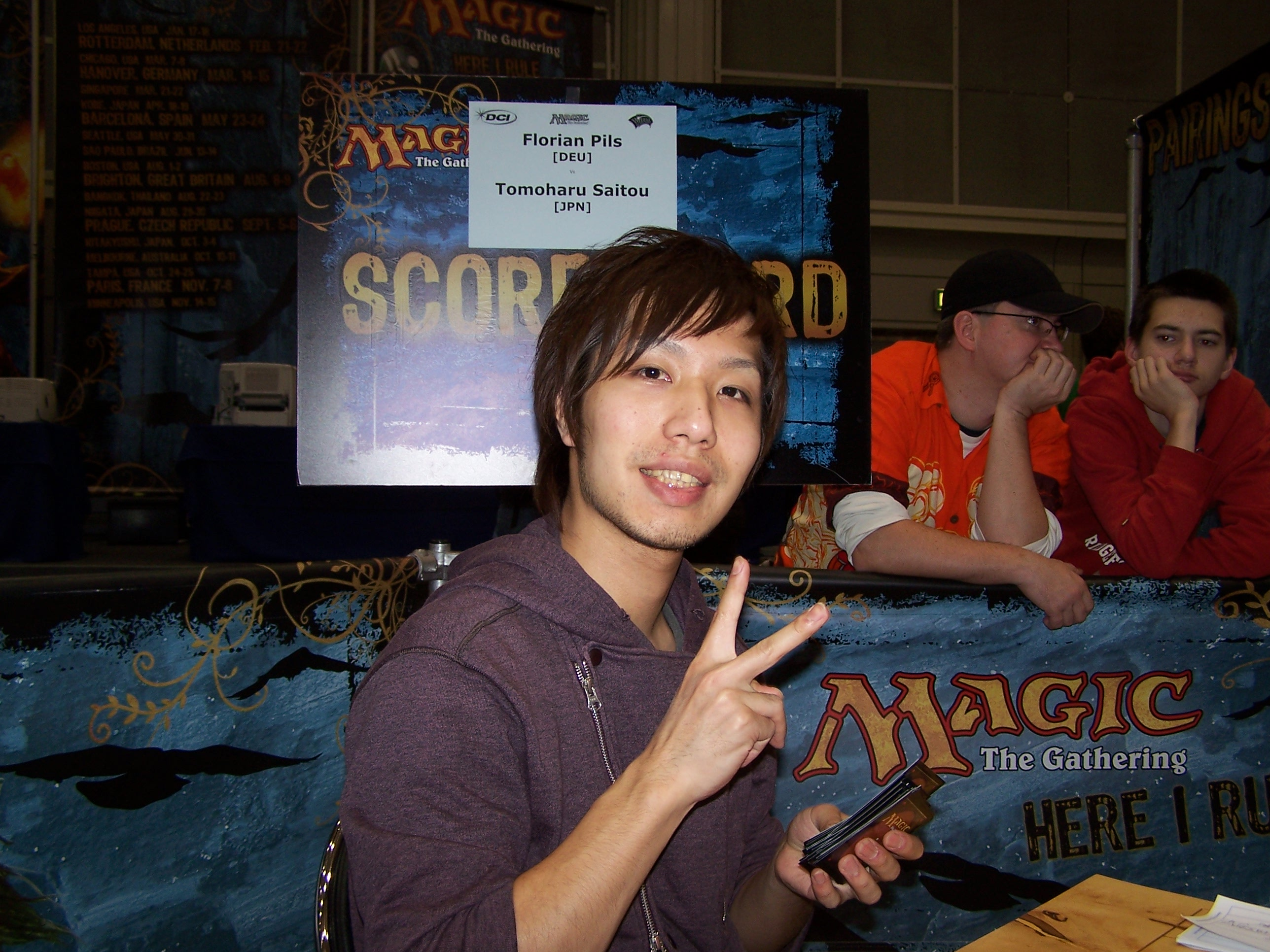
- Born: 14 December 1983; Tokyo, Japan
- Nationality: (Japan) Japanese
- Pro Tour debut: 2000 Pro Tour Chicago
- Winnings: $262,092
- Pro Tour wins (Top 8): 1 (5)
- Grand Prix wins (Top 8): 4 (24)
- Lifetime Pro Points: 506
- Planeswalker Level: 50 (Archmage)

Tomoharu Saitou (齋藤 友晴, Saitō Tomoharu) is a professional Magic: The Gathering player and the owner of Hareruya Store in Tokyo.

== Career ==
Saitou debuted at Pro Tour Chicago 2000. An 83rd-place finish meant he fell just short of making money. Later the same season, he made his first standout finish by reaching the top eight of the Asia Pacific Championship. His quarter-final opponent was to have been Peter Chao of Taiwan. However, Chao was not able to attend the final day of competition, and asked Saitou for a prize split. The judges ruled this to be bribery and disqualified Saitou, Chao, and Satoshi Nakamura who had acted as their interpreter.

After two seasons off tour, Saitou returned the Pro Tour in 2003–04, and to the elimination rounds at the premier level by finishing eighth at Grand Prix Nagoya. In 2005, he made his first Sunday appearance on the Pro Tour. Alongside Tomohiro Kaji, and Kenji Tsumura, he reached the top four of Pro Tour Atlanta. Saitou's team, One Spin, lost in the semifinals to the eventual champions Nova, with Saitou losing to Gabriel Nassif.

In 2006, Saitou won Pro Tour Charleston as a member of Team Kajiharu80, along with Tomohiro Kaji and Shouta Yasooka. At the next Pro Tour, held in Kobe, Saitou made his first individual top eight appearance. He lost in the quarterfinals to Pro Tour first-timer and eventual champion Jan-Moritz Merkel. At the end of the 2006 season, Saitou was dubbed the PoY maker, because in the past two seasons his teammates, Tsumura and Yasooka, had won the Player of the year title. The following year, it would be his turn.

In 2007, Saitou made his fourth Pro Tour top eight that year, in Yokohama, losing to Kazuya Mitamura in the semifinals. He also top eighted Grand Prix Singapore, and won Grand Prix Strasbourg. At the end of the season, he won the Player of the year title, making him the first player to do so without either winning a Pro Tour or reaching the top eight of multiple Pro Tours.

The 2008 season saw Saitou finishing third at Pro Tour Berlin and making the Top 8 of three Grand Prix, but falling 20 points short of defending his title.

In 2009 Saitou won back to back Extended Grand Prix in Singapore and Kobe. The following season, he made the top eight of three more Grand Prix, winning in Columbus. At Pro Tour Amsterdam it was announced that Saitou would be inducted into the Hall of Fame. Two weeks before his induction Saitou was disqualified for stalling at Grand Prix Florence. He subsequently received an 18-month suspension from the DCI. One day before the Hall of Fame induction ceremony Wizards of the Coast announced that Saitou would not be inducted due to his suspension.

== Accomplishments ==
Season	Event type	Location	Format	Date	Rank
2000–01	APAC Region Championship	Kuala Lumpur	Special	22–24 June 2001	DQ^{1}
2003–04	Grand Prix	Nagoya	Standard	28–29 August 2004	8
2005	Grand Prix	Osaka	Team Limited	8–9 January 2005	4
2005	Pro Tour	Atlanta	Team Limited	11–13 March 2005	4
2005	Grand Prix	Matsuyama	Limited	14–15 May 2005	7
2005	Grand Prix	Beijing	Extended	26–27 November 2005	6
2006	Pro Tour	Charleston, South Carolina	Team Constructed	16–18 June 2006	1
2006	Nationals	Ōta, Tokyo	Standard and Booster Draft	25–27 August 2006	8
2006	Grand Prix	Sydney	Limited	7–8 October 2006	3
2006	Pro Tour	Kobe	Limited	20–22 October 2006	7
2007	Grand Prix	Singapore	Extended	3–4 March 2007	8
2007	Pro Tour	Yokohama	Block Constructed	20–22 April 2007	4
2007	Grand Prix	Strasbourg	Block Constructed	19–20 May 2007	1
2008	Grand Prix	Vienna	Extended	15–16 March 2008	4
2008	Grand Prix	Copenhagen	Standard	23–24 August 2008	2
2008	Pro Tour	Berlin	Extended	31 October–2 November 2008	3
2008	Grand Prix	Atlanta	Limited	15–16 November 2008	6
2009	Grand Prix	Singapore	Extended	21–22 March 2009	1
2009	Grand Prix	Kobe	Extended	18–19 April 2009	1
2009	Grand Prix	Melbourne	Limited	10–11 October 2009	2
2010	Grand Prix	Oakland	Extended	13–14 February 2010	8
2010	Grand Prix	Madrid	Legacy	27–28 February 2010	4
2010	Grand Prix	Columbus, Ohio	Legacy	31 July–1 August 2010	1
2012–13	Grand Prix	Sydney	Limited	19–20 January 2013	3
2013–14	Grand Prix	Kyoto	Team Limited	23–24 November 2013	4
2013–14	Grand Prix	Atlanta	Limited	24–25 May 2014	2
2014–15	Grand Prix	Sydney	Limited	23–24 August 2014	6
2015–16	Grand Prix	Santiago	Limited	29–30 August 2015	2
2015–16	Grand Prix	Lyon	Limited	30 October–1 November 2015	3
2015–16	Grand Prix	Mexico City	Limited	30–31 January 2016	2
2016-17	Grand Prix	Rotterdam	Team Limited	12–13 November 2016	3

Last updated: 1 February 2016
Source: Wizards.com

Notes

- ^Note 1: Tomoharu Saitou reached the top eight of the 2001 APAC Championships as the number 1 seed after two days of competition. He was disqualified for bribery, along with Satoshi Nakamura and Peter Chao.

Other accomplishments:

- Pro Player of the Year 2007

== Suspensions ==
In 2001 after Grand Prix Kobe, Saitou was suspended for 18 months due to consecutive disqualifications. A prize split was interpreted as being bribery resulting in a disqualification at the Asian Pacific Championships. Following that Saitou was disqualified for inappropriately attempting to get his opponent disqualified. As a result of these disqualifications, the DCI suspended Saitou for 18 months.

In 2010, Saitou was voted into the Hall of Fame. However, two weeks prior to the induction Saitou was disqualified during Grand Prix Florence leading to an 18-month suspension from the game for 'slow playing'. Wizards announced without further explanation that Saitou would not be part of the Hall of Fame based on the 2010 ballot.

Preceded by (Japan) Shouta Yasooka	Pro Player of the Year; 2007	Succeeded by (Japan) Shuhei Nakamura
