= Akira Asahara =

Japanese Magic: The Gathering player

- Nationality: (Japan) Japanese
- Pro Tour debut: 2001 Pro Tour Tokyo
- Winnings: US$101,995
- Pro Tour wins (Top 8): 0 (2)
- Grand Prix wins (Top 8): 2 (10)
- Median Pro Tour Finish: 93
- Lifetime Pro Points: 228
- Planeswalker Level: 47 (Archmage)

Akira Asahara (浅原晃) is a Japanese Magic: The Gathering player. His successes include two Pro Tour top eights, two Grand Prix wins, and eight other Grand Prix top eights. He has been referred to as a rogue deck designer.

== Achievements ==
Season	Event type	Location	Format	Date	Rank
2002–03	Grand Prix	Kyoto	Sealed and Booster Draft	29–30 March 2003	1
2003–04	Grand Prix	Okayama	Extended	24–25 January 2004	3
2005	Grand Prix	Yokohama	Rochester Draft	20–21 November 2004	3
2005	Grand Prix	Matsuyama	Sealed and Booster Draft	14–15 May 2005	1
2005	Grand Prix	Niigata (city)	Block Constructed	23–24 July 2005	3
2005	Grand Prix	Kitakyushu	Extended	5–6 November 2005	8
2005	Worlds	Yokohama	Special	30 November – 4 December 2005	4
2006	Grand Prix	Hamamatsu	Team Constructed	8–9 April 2006	2
2007	Grand Prix	Kitakyushu	Sealed and Booster Draft	10–11 November 2007	3
2008	Grand Prix	Shizuoka City	Sealed and Booster Draft	8–9 March 2008	8
2008	Worlds	Memphis, Tennessee	Special	11–14 December 2008	8
2011	Grand Prix	Hiroshima	Standard	29–30 October 2011	3

Last updated: 30 October 2011
Source: Wizards.com

In 2010, Akira Asahara qualified for an invitation to the 2010 Magic Online World Championships. Asahara (known as Archer on Magic Online) reached the finals of the twelve man tournament, facing Carlos Romão. He lost the match 1–2, coming second in the tournament but still winning a $17,000 prize.
