= Magic: The Gathering Pro Tour season 2005 =

2005 Pro Tour season
- Pro Player of the Year: (Japan) Kenji Tsumura
- Rookie of the Year: (France) Pierre Canali
- World Champion: (Japan) Katsuhiro Mori
- Pro Tours: 7
- Grands Prix: 31
- Hall of Fame inductions: Jon Finkel; Darwin Kastle; Alan Comer; Tommi Hovi; Olle Råde
- Start of season: 10 September 2004
- End of season: 4 December 2005

The 2005 Pro Tour season was the tenth season of the Magic: The Gathering Pro Tour. On 10 September 2004 the season began with Grand Prix Rimini. It ended on 4 December 2005 with the conclusion of the 2005 World Championship in Yokohama and was thus the longest Pro Tour season ever. The season consisted of 31 Grand Prixs and 7 Pro Tours, held in Columbus, Nagoya, Atlanta, Philadelphia, London, Los Angeles, and Yokohama. At the end of the season Kenji Tsumura was proclaimed Pro Player of the year as the first Japanese player. Also the first class of the Hall of Fame was inducted. The inductees were Jon Finkel, Darwin Kastle, Tommi Hovi, Alan Comer, and Olle Råde.

== Grand Prixs – Rimini, Vienna, Austin ==
GP Rimini (10–11 September)

- Format: Standard
- Attendance: 750
1. (Italy) Domingo Ottati
2. (Germany) Florian Pils
3. (Italy) Giovanni Gesiot
4. (Croatia) Luka Gasparac
5. (Italy) Davide Ghini
6. (Czech Republic) Jan Brodzak
7. (Italy) Andrea Paselli
8. (Italy) Luca Cialini

GP Vienna (9–10 October)

- Format: Rochester Draft
- Attendance: 979
1. (Austria) Nicolaus Eigner
2. (France) Antoine Ruel
3. (Germany) René Kraft
4. (Croatia) Sasha Zorc
5. (Germany) Sebastian Aljiaj
6. (Italy) Daniele Canavesi
7. (Italy) Dario Minieri
8. (Austria) Stefan Jedlicka

GP Austin (9–10 October)

- Format: Rochester Draft
- Attendance: 386
1. (United States) Jonathan Sonne
2. (United States) Eugene Levin
3. (United States) Chris Prochak
4. (United States) Gerry Thompson
5. (United States) Jim Finstrom
6. (United States) Neil Reeves
7. (United States) Michael Jacob
8. (United States) Mike Thompson

== Pro Tour – Columbus (29–31 October 2004) ==
Pierre Canali from France won the inaugural Pro Tour of the season, which was also the first Pro Tour he attended. His deck was an aggressive all-artifact deck called "Affinity". For the first time Japan had three players amongst the final eight while the USA had in the Top 8 for the first time in three Pro Tours.

=== Tournament data ===
Prize pool: $200,130
Players: 286
Format: Extended
Head Judge: Jaap Brouwer

=== Top 8 ===
Quarter-finals
1	Pierre Canali	3
8	Geoffrey Siron	1
4	Masashi Oiso	0
5	Olivier Ruel	3
2	Nicholas West	3
7	Ryuichi Arita	0
3	Gadiel Szleifer	1
6	Shuhei Nakamura	3

Semi-finals
Pierre Canali	3
Olivier Ruel	2
Nicholas West	0
Shuhei Nakamura	3

Finals
Pierre Canali	3
Shuhei Nakamura	0

=== Final standings ===
Place	Player	Prize	Pro Points	Comment
1	(France) Pierre Canali	$30,000	25	Pro Tour debut
2	(Japan) Shuhei Nakamura	$20,000	20	
3	(United Kingdom) Nicholas West	$15,000	16	Pro Tour debut
4	(France) Olivier Ruel	$13,000	16	3rd Final day
5	(United States) Gadiel Szleifer	$9,000	12	
6	(Japan) Masashi Oiso	$8,500	12	4th Final day
7	(Japan) Ryuichi Arita	$8,000	12	2nd Final day
8	(Belgium) Geoffrey Siron	$7,500	12	

=== Pro Player of the year standings ===
Rank	Player	Pro Points
1	(France) Pierre Canali	25
2	(Japan) Shuhei Nakamura	20
3	(France) Olivier Ruel	18
4	(United Kingdom) Nicholas West	16
5	(Japan) Ryuichi Arita	12
5	(Japan) Masashi Oiso	12
5	(Belgium) Geoffrey Siron	12
5	(United States) Gadiel Szleifer	12

== Grand Prixs – Helsinki, Brisbane, Yokohama, Porto Alegre, Paris, Chicago, Osaka ==
GP Helsinki (6–7 November)

- Format: Rochester Draft
- Attendance: 455
1. (France) Olivier Ruel
2. (Finland) Mikko Leiviskä
3. (France) Jean Charles Salvin
4. (Denmark) Ulrik Tarp
5. (Sweden) Anton Jonsson
6. (Germany) Wenzel Krautmann
7. (Belgium) Pavlos Akritas
8. (Finland) Erkki Siira

GP Brisbane (13–14 November)

- Format: Rochester Draft
- Attendance: 222
1. (Australia) Will Copeman
2. (Australia) Anatoli Lightfoot
3. (Japan) Masami Ibamoto
4. (Australia) Andrew Grain
5. (Australia) Tom Hay
6. (Australia) Andrew Varga
7. (Australia) Jarrod Bright
8. (Australia) Bryce Trevilyan

GP Yokohama (20–21 November)

- Format: Rochester Draft
- Attendance: 707
1. (Japan) Kazuki Katou
2. (Japan) Tomohiro Kaji
3. (Japan) Akira Asahara
4. (Japan) Koutarou Ootsuka
5. (Japan) Masahiko Morita
6. (Japan) Rei Hashimoto
7. (Japan) Takashi Akiyama
8. (Japan) Ren Ishikawa

GP Porto Alegre (20–21 November)

- Format: Rochester Draft
- Attendance: 342
1. (Argentina) Jose Barbero
2. (Argentina) Gabriel Caligaris
3. (Argentina) Mauro Kina
4. (Brazil) Rafael Mendonça
5. (Brazil) Guilherme Fonseca
6. (Brazil) Paulo Vitor Damo da Rosa
7. (Brazil) Renato Wholers
8. (Brazil) Adilson de Oliveira

GP Paris (27–28 November)

- Format: Rochester Draft
- Attendance: 1594
1. (Netherlands) Wilco Pinkster
2. (France) Bastien Perez
3. (Netherlands) Wessel Oomens
4. (France) Raphael Lévy
5. (Italy) Giuseppe Reale
6. (Czech Republic) Arnost Zidek
7. (Germany) Stephan Meyer
8. (France) Jean-Baptiste Gouesse

GP Chicago (18–19 December)

- Format: Team Limited
- Attendance: 474 (158 teams)

1. :B

(United States) Timothy Aten
(United States) Gadiel Szleifer
(United States) John Pelcak

2. Gindy's Sister's Fan Club

(United States) Adam Chambers
(United States) Zach Parker
(United States) Charles Gindy

3. The Max Fischer Players

(United States) Igor Frayman
(United States) Joshua Ravitz
(United States) Chris Pikula

4. Voracious Cobra

(United States) Bob Allbright
(United States) Mike Hron
(United States) Paul Artl

GP Osaka (8–9 January)

- Format: Team Limited
- Attendance: 480 (160 teams)

1. P.S.2

(Japan) Masashiro Kuroda
(Japan) Katsuhiro Mori
(Japan) Masahiko Morita

2. FireBall.Pros

(Japan) Jin Okamoto
(Japan) Tsuyoshi Ikeda
(Japan) Itaru Ishida

3. Gatas Brilhantes

(Japan) Ichiro Shimura
(Japan) Shu Komuro
(Japan) Tomohide Sasagawa

4. One Spin

(Japan) Tomohiro Kaji
(Japan) Kenji Tsumura
(Japan) Tomoharu Saitou

== Pro Tour – Nagoya (28–30 January 2005) ==
Pro Tour Nagoya was the last Pro Tour employing the Rochester Draft format. Shu Komuro from Japan defeated Anton Jonsson in the finals to win the tournament.

=== Tournament data ===
Prize pool: $200,130
Players: 236
Format: Rochester Draft (Champions of Kamigawa)
Head Judge: Collin Jackson

=== Top 8 ===
Quarter-finals
1	Masashiro Kuroda	1
8	Anton Jonsson	3
4	Frank Karsten	1
5	Terry Soh	3
2	Jarno Harkonen	1
7	Murray Evans	3
3	Vasilis Fatouros	1
6	Shu Komuro	3

Semi-finals
Anton Jonsson	3
Terry Soh	1
Murray Evans	1
Shu Komuro	3

Finals
Anton Jonsson	1
Shu Komuro	3

=== Final standings ===
Place	Player	Prize	Pro Points	Comment
1	(Japan) Shu Komuro	$30,000	25	
2	(Sweden) Anton Jonsson	$20,000	20	5th Final day
3	(Malaysia) Terry Soh	$15,000	16	2nd Final day
4	(Canada) Murray Evans	$13,000	16	2nd Final day
5	(Japan) Masashiro Kuroda	$9,500	12	2nd Final day
6	(Netherlands) Frank Karsten	$8,500	12	
7	(Finland) Jarno Harkonen	$7,500	12	
8	(Greece) Vasilis Fatouros	$6,500	12	1st Greek in a Top 8

=== Pro Player of the year standings ===
Rank	Player	Pro Points
1	(Japan) Shu Komuro	31
2	(Japan) Shuhei Nakamura	30
3	(France) Pierre Canali	28
4	(France) Olivier Ruel	27
5	(Sweden) Anton Jonsson	23

== Grand Prixs – Boston, Eindhoven, Seattle ==
GP Boston (5–6 February)

- Format: Extended
- Attendance: 699
1. (Japan) Masashi Oiso
2. (United States) Lucas Glavin
3. (United States) Keith McLaughlin
4. Benjamin Dempsey
5. (United States) Osyp Lebedowicz
6. (Japan) Masahiko Morita
7. Anthony Impellizzierei
8. (United States) Daniel O'Mahoney-Schwartz

GP Eindhoven (26–27 February)

- Format: Extended
- Attendance: 1012
1. (France) Sebastien Roux
2. (Netherlands) Rogier Maaten
3. (Germany) Xuan-Phi Nguyen
4. (Germany) Tobias Radloff
5. (Netherlands) Kamiel Cornelissen
6. (Germany) Michael Leicht
7. (Czech Republic) Petr Nahodil
8. (Netherlands) Bas Postema

GP Seattle (5–6 March)

- Format: Extended
- Attendance: 390
1. (United States) Ernie Marchesano
2. (Canada) Taylor Putnam
3. (Japan) Shuhei Nakamura
4. (United States) Max McCall
5. (United States) Grant Struck
6. (Canada) John Ripley
7. (Japan) Tsuyoshi Fujita
8. (United States) Ryan Cimera

== Pro Tour – Atlanta (11–13 March 2005) ==
The Canadian French cooperation team "Nova" won Pro Tour Atlanta, defeating the American team "We Add" in the final. "Nova" consisted of Gabriel Tsang, David Rood, and Gabriel Nassif. For Nassif it was the first Pro Tour victory after five previous final day appearances including three second places. Atlanta was the last Pro Tour using the three-person team Limited format, although it was still used for the team competition at the World Championship that year and the next.

=== Tournament data ===
Players: 357 (119 teams)
Prize Pool: $200,100
Format: Team Kamigawa Block Sealed (Champions of Kamigawa, Betrayers of Kamigawa) – first day, Team Kamigawa Block Rochester Draft (Champions of Kamigawa-Betrayers of Kamigawa) – final two days
Head Judge: Sheldon Menery

=== Top 4 ===
Semifinals
1	Les baltringues de Ludipia	0
4	We Add	2
3	One Spin	1
2	Nova	2

Semi-finals
We add	0
Nova	2

=== Final standings ===
Place	Team	Player	Prize	Pro Points	Comment
1	Nova	(Canada) Gabriel Tsang	$60,000	20	3rd Final day
1	Nova	(Canada) David Rood	$60,000	20	2nd Final day
1	Nova	(France) Gabriel Nassif	$60,000	20	6th Final day
2	We Add	(United States) Don Smith	$30,000	16	Pro Tour debut
2	We Add	(United States) Andrew Pacifico	$30,000	16	
2	We Add	(United States) Adam Chambers	$30,000	16	
3	Les baltringues de Ludipia	(France) Benjamin Caumes	$18,000	12	2nd Final day
3	Les baltringues de Ludipia	(France) Nicolas Bornarel	$18,000	12	
3	Les baltringues de Ludipia	(France) Camille Fenet	$18,000	12	
4	One Spin	(Japan) Tomohiro Kaji	$15,000	12	
4	One Spin	(Japan) Kenji Tsumura	$15,000	12	
4	One Spin	(Japan) Tomoharu Saitou	$15,000	12	

=== Pro Player of the year standings ===
Rank	Player	Pro Points
1	(Japan) Shu Komuro	39
2	(Japan) Shuhei Nakamura	32
3	(France) Pierre Canali	31
3	(France) Olivier Ruel	31
5	(Japan) Masashi Oiso	29

== Grand Prixs – Singapore, Leipzig, Lisbon, Detroit ==
GP Singapore (19–20 March)

- Format: Extended
- Attendance: 373
1. (Japan) Itaru Ishida
2. (Malaysia) Shih Chien Chang
3. (Japan) Ichirou Shimura
4. (Hong Kong) Yeung Sun Kit
5. (Indonesia) Dennis Yuliadinata
6. (Japan) Shu Komuro
7. (Australia) Oliver Oks
8. (Singapore) Gabriel Kang

GP Leipzig (26–27 March)

- Format: Sealed and Booster Draft
- Attendance: 899
1. (Russia) Rustam Bakirov
2. (Germany) Rosario Maij
3. (Germany) Max Bracht
4. (Austria) Niki Jedlicka
5. (Germany) Philip Fetzer
6. (Denmark) Sune Ellegard
7. (Belgium) Bernardo Da Costa Cabral
8. (Poland) Mateusz Dabkowski

GP Lisbon (23–24 April)

- Format: Sealed and Booster Draft
- Attendance: 1169
1. (Portugal) Marcio Carvalho
2. (Portugal) Luis Sousa
3. (Sweden) Mikael Polgary
4. (Spain) David Blazquez
5. (Portugal) Joao Martins
6. (France) Pierre-Jerome Meurisse
7. (Portugal) Marco Manuel
8. (Sweden) Anton Jonsson

GP Detroit (23–24 April)

- Format: Sealed and Booster Draft
- Attendance: 491
1. (United States) Jordan Berkowitz
2. (Canada) Richard Hoaen
3. (United States) Michael Krumb
4. (Netherlands) Jeroen Remie
5. (United States) Osyp Lebedowicz
6. (United States) William Postlethwait
7. (United Kingdom) Sam Gomersall
8. (United States) Patrick Sullivan

== Pro Tour – Philadelphia (6–8 May 2005) ==
Pro Tour Philadelphia featured a tournament system different from those of other Pro Tours. While Swiss system was still used all players with three or more losses and/or draws were automatically dropped from the tournament. Prizes were given out not in relation to the final standings, but for the individual matches won, where matches in later rounds of the tournament were worth more than those in the earlier rounds. It was also announced in the week prior to Pro Tour Philadelphia, that the end of the year payout based on Pro Points would be dropped after the season in favor of the Pro Club. Under the new system a player would receive special benefits based on the total number of Pro Points he had acquired in a season.

16-year-old Gadiel Szleifer defeated 18-year-old Kenji Tsumura in the final to win the tournament. Szleifer played a control deck built around Gifts Ungiven. Former Pro Player of the year Kai Budde received a lot of attention for being undefeated after day one, but was eliminated after he picked up three losses in the first three rounds of day two.

=== Tournament data ===
Players: 311
Prize Pool: $194,898
Format: Kamigawa Block Constructed (Champions of Kamigawa, Betrayers of Kamigawa)
Head Judge: Mike Guptil

=== Top 8 ===
Quarter-finals
1	Steven Wolfman	3
8	André Müller	2
4	Jeff Novekoff	1
5	Gadiel Szleifer	3
2	Ryan Cimera	2
7	Kenji Tsumura	3
3	Olivier Ruel	3
6	Mark Herberholz	1

Semi-finals
Steven Wolfman	0
Gadiel Szleifer	3
Kenji Tsumura	3
Olivier Ruel	0

Finals
Gadiel Szleifer	3
Kenji Tsumura	2

=== Final standings ===
Place	Player	Prize	Pro Points	Comment
1	(United States) Gadiel Szleifer	$21,725	25	2nd Final day
2	(Japan) Kenji Tsumura	$12,275	20	2nd Final day
3	(Canada) Steven Wolfman	$7,475	16	2nd Final day
4	(France) Olivier Ruel	$6,950	16	4th Final day
5	(United States) Ryan Cimera	$2,825	12	Pro Tour debut
6	(United States) Jeff Novekoff	$4,750	12	Pro Tour debut
7	(United States) Mark Herberholz	$3,175	12	2nd Final day
8	(Germany) André Müller	$2,075	12	

=== Pro Player of the year standings ===
Rank	Player	Pro Points
1	(France) Olivier Ruel	49
2	(United States) Gadiel Szleifer	47
3	(Japan) Shu Komuro	45
4	(Japan) Kenji Tsumura	44
5	(Japan) Shuhei Nakamura	40

== Grand Prixs – Matsuyama, Bologna ==
GP Matsuyama (14–15 May)

- Format: Sealed and Booster Draft
- Attendance: 420
1. (Japan) Akira Asahara
2. (Japan) Masashi Oiso
3. (Japan) Kentarou Nonaka
4. (Japan) Takayuki Toochika
5. (Japan) Osamu Fujita
6. (Japan) Shuhei Nakamura
7. (Japan) Tomoharu Saitou
8. (Japan) Jun'ya Takahashi

GP Bologna (11–12 June)

- Format: Sealed and Booster Draft
- Attendance: 654
1. (France) Olivier Ruel
2. (Germany) David Brucker
3. (Italy) Giulio Barra
4. (Switzerland) Leonard Barbou
5. (Czech Republic) Tomas Klimes
6. (England) Quentin Martin
7. (Italy) Bruno Panara
8. (Italy) Marco Castellano

== Pro Tour – London (8–10 July 2005) ==
Geoffrey Siron from Belgium won Pro Tour London, defeating Tsuyoshi Fujita in the finals. In the Top 8 Siron did not lose a single game.

=== Tournament data ===
Players: 314
Prize Pool: $200,130
Format: Booster Draft (Champions of Kamigawa-Betrayers of Kamigawa-Saviors of Kamigawa)
Head Judge: Jaap Brouwer

=== Top 8 ===
Quarter-finals
1	Antti Malin	3
8	Tomi Walamies	1
4	Arnost Zidek	2
5	Tsuyoshi Fujita	3
2	David Larsson	1
7	Johan Sadeghpour	3
3	Masashi Oiso	0
6	Geoffrey Siron	3

Semi-finals
Antti Malin	1
Tsuyoshi Fujita	3
Johan Sadeghpour	0
Geoffrey Siron	3

Finals
Tsuyoshi Fujita	0
Geoffrey Siron	3

=== Final standings ===
Place	Player	Prize	Pro Points	Comment
1	(Belgium) Geoffrey Siron	$30,000	25	2nd Final day, 1st Belgian to win a Pro Tour
2	(Japan) Tsuyoshi Fujita	$20,000	20	2nd Final day
3	(Sweden) Johan Sadeghpour	$15,000	16	
4	(Finland) Antti Malin	$13,000	16	
5	(Japan) Masashi Oiso	$9,000	12	5th Final day
6	(Finland) Tomi Walamies	$8,500	12	3rd Final day
7	(Czech Republic) Arnost Zidek	$8,000	12	
8	(Sweden) David Larsson	$7,500	12	

=== Pro Player of the year standings ===
Rank	Player	Pro Points
1	(France) Olivier Ruel	59
2	(United States) Gadiel Szleifer	50
3	(Japan) Shu Komuro	49
4	(Japan) Shuhei Nakamura	47
4	(Japan) Masashi Oiso	47
4	(Japan) Kenji Tsumura	47

== Grand Prixs – Minneapolis, Niigata, Taipei, Salt Lake City, Mexico City, Nottingham ==
GP Minneapolis (16–17 July)

- Format: Block Constructed
- Attendance: 404
1. (United States) Alex Lieberman
2. (United States) Mark Herberholz
3. (United States) Dustin Marquis
4. (United States) Adam Yurchick
5. (Brazil) Celso Zampere
6. (United States) Andrew Stokinger
7. (United States) Gerry Thompson
8. (United States) Sean Inlow

GP Niigata (23–24 July)

- Format: Block Constructed
- Attendance: 476
1. (Japan) Katsuhiro Mori
2. (Japan) Tomohiro Aridome
3. (Japan) Akira Asahara
4. (Japan) Masashi Oiso
5. (Japan) Takuya Oosawa
6. (Japan) Kenji Tsumura
7. (Japan) Ryouma Shiozu
8. (Japan) Suhan Yun

GP Taipei (6–7 August)

- Format: Block Constructed
- Attendance: 261
1. (Japan) Osamu Fujita
2. (Japan) Masahiko Morita
3. (Japan) Jun'ichirou Bandou
4. (Japan) Shu Komuro
5. (Taiwan) Tai Chi Huang
6. (Singapore) Aik Seng Khoo
7. (Japan) Masashi Oiso
8. (Japan) Masahiro Kuroda

GP Salt Lake City (27–28 August)

- Format: Block Constructed
- Attendance: 250
1. (United States) Antonino De Rosa
2. (United States) Karl Briem
3. (Japan) Kenji Tsumura
4. (United States) Mark Ioli
5. (Netherlands) Frank Karsten
6. (United States) Gadiel Szleifer
7. (United States) Gabe Walls
8. (Netherlands) Rogier Maaten

GP Mexico City (3–4 September)

- Format: Block Constructed
- Attendance: 305
1. (Netherlands) Julien Nuijten
2. (Mexico) Edgar Leiva
3. (Netherlands) Frank Karsten
4. (Venezuela) Maximiliano Liprandi
5. (United States) William Postlethwait
6. (United States) Gerard Fabiano
7. (Venezuela) Daniel Fior
8. (Denmark) Rasmus Sibast

GP Nottingham (3–4 September)

- Format: Limited
- Attendance: 560
1. (Czech Republic) Nikola Vavra
2. (Netherlands) Roel van Heeswijk
3. (Austria) Nikolaus Eigner
4. (Austria) Philip Reich
5. (France) Jean Charles Salvin
6. (Spain) Ricard Tuduri
7. (Slovenia) Jure Trunk
8. (Spain) Alfred Benages

== Pro Tour – Los Angeles (28–30 October 2005) ==
Antoine Ruel defeated Billy Moreno in the finals to become champion of Pro Tour Los Angeles. He played a blue-black control deck, built around Psychatog.

=== Tournament data ===
Players: 340
Prize Pool: $200,130
Format: Extended
Head Judge: Gijsbert Hoogendijk

=== Top 8 ===
Quarter-finals
1	Kenji Tsumura	3
8	Ryuichi Arita	1
4	Antoine Ruel	3
5	Tsuyoshi Fujita	1
2	Billy Moreno	3
7	Ervin Tormos	2
3	Chris McDaniel	3
6	Chih-Hsian Chang	1

Semi-finals
Kenji Tsumura	0
Antoine Ruel	3
Billy Moreno	3
Chris McDaniel	2

Finals
Antoine Ruel	3
Billy Moreno	0

=== Final standings ===
Place	Player	Prize	Pro Points	Comment
1	(France) Antoine Ruel	$30,000	25	3rd Final day
2	(United States) Billy Moreno	$20,000	20	
3	(Japan) Kenji Tsumura	$15,000	16	3rd Final day
4	(United States) Chris McDaniel	$13,000	16	
5	(Japan) Tsuyoshi Fujita	$9,000	12	3rd Final day
6	(Taiwan) Chih-Hsiang Chang	$8,500	12	1st Taiwanese Player in a Top 8
7	(United States) Ervin Tormos	$8,000	12	Pro Tour debut
8	(Japan) Ryuichi Arita	$7,500	12	3rd Final day

=== Pro Player of the year standings ===
Rank	Player	Pro Points
1	(Japan) Kenji Tsumura	72
2	(France) Olivier Ruel	67
3	(Japan) Masashi Oiso	62
4	(United States) Gadiel Szleifer	58
5	(Japan) Shu Komuro	55

== Grand Prixs – Melbourne, Copenhagen, Kitakyuushuu, Philadelphia, Bilbao, Beijing ==
GP Melbourne (5–6 November)

- Format: Extended
- Attendance: 140
1. (Australia) James Zhang
2. (Australia) Paul Chalder
3. (Australia) Tim He
4. (Australia) David Zhao
5. (Australia) Andrew Vance
6. (Australia) Hugh Glanville
7. (Australia) Ben Fleming
8. (Australia) Sam Atkinson

GP Copenhagen (5–6 November)

- Format: Extended
- Attendance: 340
1. (Netherlands) Julien Nuijten
2. (Finland) Kim Valori
3. (Denmark) Alexandre Rathcke
4. (Netherlands) Wessel Oomens
5. (France) Olivier Ruel
6. (Finland) Pasi Virtanen
7. (Germany) Bodo Rösner
8. (Greece) Nikolaos Lahanas

GP Kitakyuushuu (5–6 November)

- Format: Extended
- Attendance: 272
1. (Japan) Tomohiro Kaji
2. (Japan) Ryo Ogura
3. (Japan) Makihito Mihara
4. (Japan) Masashi Oiso
5. (Japan) Masahiko Morita
6. (Japan) Jin Okamoto
7. (Japan) Itaru Ishida
8. (Japan) Akira Asahara

GP Philadelphia (12–13 November)

- Format: Legacy
- Attendance: 495
1. (United States) Jonathan Sonne
2. (United States) Chris Pikula
3. (Canada) Pasquale Ruggiero
4. (United States) Tom Smart
5. (United States) Paul Serignese
6. (United States) Pat McGregor
7. (United States) Ben Goodman
8. (Canada) Lam Phan

GP Bilbao (19–20 November)

- Format: Extended
- Attendance: 938
1. (France) Olivier Ruel
2. (Portugal) Marcio Carvalho
3. (Belgium) Geoffrey Siron
4. (Spain) Jacob Arias Garcia
5. (Netherlands) Rogier Maaten
6. (France) Jonathan Rispal
7. (Spain) Gonzalo Domingo
8. (Spain) Sergi Herrero

GP Beijing (26–27 November)

- Format: Extended
- Attendance: 159
1. (China) Dong Zhong
2. (Japan) Masashi Oiso
3. (France) Olivier Ruel
4. (Japan) Katsuhiro Mori
5. (China) Li Gong Wei
6. (Japan) Tomoharu Saitou
7. (Taiwan) Ming Da Tsai
8. (Japan) Kenji Tsumura

== 2005 World Championships – Yokohama (30 November – 4 December 2005) ==
The tournament began with the first Hall of Fame induction ceremony. Jon Finkel, Darwin Kastle, Tommi Hovi, Alan Comer and Olle Råde were honored for their accomplishments and their determination to the game. In the final of the 2005 World Championship Katsuhiro Mori defeated Frank Karsten, thus completing an all-Japanese Worlds in Yokohama. The Top 4 also included Japanese players Akira Asahara and Tomohiro Kaji, shortly before Japan had won the team competition, and even the Pro Player of the year went to Japanese Kenji Tsumura.

=== Tournament data ===
Prize pool: $208,130 (individual) + $195,000 (national teams)
Players: 287
Formats: Standard, Booster Draft (Ravnica), Extended
Head Judge: Collin Jackson, Sheldon Menery

=== Top 8 ===
Quarter-finals
1	Marcio Carvalho	1
8	Akira Asahara	3
4	Ding Leong	2
5	Frank Karsten	3
2	Tomohiro Kaji	3
7	André Coimbra	1
3	Katsuhiro Mori	3
6	Shuhei Nakamura	0

Semi-finals
Akira Asahara	2
Frank Karsten	3
Tomohiro Kaji	1
Katsuhiro Mori	3

Finals
Frank Karsten	1
Katsuhiro Mori	3

=== Final standings ===
Place	Player	Prize	Pro Points	Comment
1	(Japan) Katsuhiro Mori	$35,000	32	
2	(Netherlands) Frank Karsten	$23,000	24	2nd Final day
3	(Japan) Tomohiro Kaji	$15,000	16	2nd Final day
4	(Japan) Akira Asahara	$13,000	16	
5	(Portugal) Marcio Carvalho	$9,500	12	
6	(Singapore) Ding Leong	$8,500	12	
7	(Japan) Shuhei Nakamura	$7,500	12	2nd Final day
8	(Portugal) André Coimbra	$6,500	12	

=== National team competition ===
1. Japan (Ichiro Shimura, Takuma Morifuji, Masashi Oiso)
2. United States (Jonathan Sonne, Antonino De Rosa, Neil Reeves)

== Pro Player of the year final standings ==
After the World Championship Kenji Tsumura was awarded the Pro Player of the year title as the first Japanese player.

Rank	Player	Pro Points	Prize
1	(Japan) Kenji Tsumura	84	$12,000
2	(France) Olivier Ruel	83	$11,800
3	(Japan) Masashi Oiso	80	$11,600
4	(Japan) Shuhei Nakamura	66	$11,400
5	(United States) Gadiel Szleifer	62	$11,200
