= List of professional Magic: The Gathering players =

This is a list of all Magic: The Gathering players who have acquired 100 or more pro points over the course of their career. After a player has won 100 pro points, he or she is allowed to vote for the Hall of Fame. Until 2013 that player would also be available to be voted into the Hall of Fame, but beginning with the 2014 voting this threshold has been increased to 150 pro points. In addition players aren't eligible for the Hall of Fame until 9 years after their debut on the pro tour. This list compiles the most important statistics about these pro players: Their name, nationality, the number of Pro Tours won, the number of Pro Tour top 8 finishes, their best finish at a Pro Tour, the number of Grand Prix won, the number of Grand Prix top 8 finishes, their best Grand Prix finish, their lifetime pro points, and their Pro Tour debut. Statistics are up to date as of 11 May 2017.

Key

*	Players in blue are Hall of Famers

Player	Nationality	PT Wins	PT Top 8	PT Best	GP Wins	GP Top 8	GP Best	Pro points	PT Debut
Todd Anderson	United States	0	0	17	0	4	2	107	Honolulu 2006
Fabrizio Anteri	United Kingdom	0	0	29	5	10	1	158	Honolulu 2012 (Dark Ascension)
Ryuichi Arita	Japan	0	4	3	0	0		117	Los Angeles 1999
Akira Asahara	Japan	0	2	4	2	10	1	232	Tokyo 2001
Dirk Baberowski *	Germany	3	5	1	0	3	2	227	Chicago 1998
David Bachmann	United States	0	2	3	0	0		109	Columbus 1996
Jose Barbero	Argentina	0	1	6	2	6	1	136	Brussels 2000 (Worlds)
Frederico Bastos	Portugal	0	2	6	0	0		110	Houston 2002
Chris Benafel	United States	0	2	2	3	8	1	172	Los Angeles 1999
Samuel Black	United States	0	2	3	1	14	1	403	Honolulu 2006
Trevor Blackwell	United States	1	1	1	1	3	1	114	Los Angeles 1997
Richard Bland	United Kingdom	0	1	2	0	3	2	118	Prague 2006
Lukas Blohon	Czech Republic	1	2	1	1	7	2	294	Yokohama 2007
Marco Blume	Germany	2	3	1	1	1	1	130	Rome 1998
Noah Boeken	Netherlands	0	0	11	2	7	1	157	Paris 1997
Kyle Boggemes	United States	0	1	2	1	2	1	138	Charleston 2006
Nico Bohny	Switzerland	0	2	5	1	2	1	180	San Francisco 2004 (Worlds)
Brian Braun-Duin	United States	0	0		2	10	1	181	Honolulu 2012 (Dark Ascension)
David Brucker	Germany	0	0	6^{[I]}	1	6	1	126	Yokohama 1999 (Worlds)
Manuel Bucher	Switzerland	0	1	6	1	4	1	107	Columbus 2004
Kai Budde *	Germany	7	10	1	7	15	1	560	Mainz 1997
Randy Buehler *	United States	1	1	1	1	7	1	126	Chicago 1997
Kurt Burgner	United States	0	3	2	0	0		109	Los Angeles 1996
Joel Calafell	Spain	0	1	7	1	3	1	119	Columbus 2004
Christian Calcano	United States	0	0	13	2	7	1	244	San Juan 2010
Marco Cammiluzzi	Italy	0	1	6	0	5	2	160	Kobe 2006
Pierre Canali	France	1	1	1	0	1	8	103	Columbus 2004
Franck Canu	France	0	0	11	0	4	3	148	Rome 1998
Marcio Carvalho	Portugal	0	3	2	3	13	1	341	London 2005
Pedro Carvalho	Brazil	0	1	8	0	4	4	113	Austin 2009
Benjamin Caumes	France	0	2	3	0	1	2	109	Boston 2002
Tiago Chan	Portugal	0	2	3	0	0		164	Brussels 2000 (Worlds)
Patrick Chapin *	United States	1	5	1	0	4	2	360	Paris 1997
Paul Cheon	United States	0	0	12	3	8	1	217	Kobe 2006
Kelvin Chew	Singapore	0	1	6	1	3	1	149	Philadelphia 2011
Jason Chung	New Zealand	0	1	5	0	3	4	170	Philadelphia 2011
Stanislav Cifka	Czech Republic	1	2	1	0	3	5	206	Prague 2006
Trey Van Cleave	United States	0	0	23	3	7	1	128	Paris 1997
Daniel Clegg	United States	0	2	3	2	7	1	153	Chicago 1997
Cohen, Justin	United States	0	1	2	2	2	1	107	
André Coimbra	Portugal	1	2	1	0	5	2	139	Yokohama 2005 (Worlds)
Alan Comer *	United Kingdom	0	5	2	0	2	3	220	Columbus 1996
Kamiel Cornelissen *	Netherlands	1	6	1	2	6	1	355	New York 2000 (1999–2000 season)
Matthew Costa	United States	0	1	6	1	6	1	165	San Juan 2010
Patrick Cox	United States	0	3	5	0	6	2	239	Berlin 2008
Andrew Cuneo	United States	0	2	2	1	5	1	274	Paris 1997
Jeff Cunningham	Canada	0	1	5	1	3	1	157	Chicago 1999
Bernardo Da Costa Cabral	Belgium	0	0	11	0	2	2	148	Houston 2002
Pierre Dagen	France	0	2	2	0	3	2	176	Paris 2011
Paulo Vitor Damo da Rosa *	Brazil	2	12	1	2	19	1	582	Berlin 2003 (Worlds)
Martin Dang	Denmark	1	1	1	1	3	1	159	Nice 2002
Brian Davis	United States	0	2	2	0	3	3	120	Chicago 1999
Antonino De Rosa	United States	0	1	6	4	11	1	302	London 1999
Antonio Del Moral León	Spain	1	1	1	0	2	3	114	Seattle 2012 (Return to Ravnica)
Louis Deltour	France	0	0		0	4	2	115	Hollywood 2008
Melissa DeTora	United States	0	1	6	0	2	2	119	Venice 2003
Jérémy Dezani	France	1	1	1	2	11	1	221	San Juan 2010
Patrick Dickmann	Germany	0	2	4	1	1	1	154	Nagoya 2011
Jan Doise	Belgium	0	1	8	0	2	2	141	New York 2000 (2000–01 season)
Robin Dolar	Slovenia	0	0	19	1	3	1	141	Barcelona 2012 (Avacyn Restored)
Javier Dominguez	Spain	0	0	11	2	6	1	183	New Orleans 2003
Rob Dougherty *	United States	1	5	1	1	6	1	318	New York 1996
Reid Duke *	United States	0	2	5	5	20	1	363	Amsterdam 2010
Willy Edel *	Brazil	0	4	2	1	7	1	319	New York 2000 (2000–01 season)
Nikolaus Eigner	Austria	0	0	16	1	3	1	104	Amsterdam 2004
Thomas Enevoldsen	Denmark	0	0		1	2	1	117	Kobe 2006
Sigurd Eskeland	Norway	1	1	1	0	3	2	149	New York 1997
Samuele Estratti	Italy	1	1	1	0	4	3	175	Memphis 2008 (Worlds)
Gerard Fabiano	United States	0	1	4	3	10	1	303	New York 2001
Chris Fennell	United States	0	1	7	1	9	1	217	Boston 2003
Jon Finkel *	United States	3	16	1	3	9	1	648	Seattle 1996 (Worlds)
Ivan Floch	(Slovakia) Slovak Republic	1	3	1	1	5	1	333	San Francisco 2004 (Worlds)
Igor Frayman	United States	0	0	7 ^{[II]}	0	1	3	109	Dallas 1996
Marcelino Freeman	Mexico	0	0		0	2	2	120	San Francisco 2011 (Worlds)
Ben Friedman	United States	0	0	10	0	4	2	178	San Juan 2010
Eric Froehlich *	United States	0	4	4	2	15	1	432	London 1999
Osamu Fujita	Japan	0	1	2	1	9	1	247	Los Angeles 1998
Tsuyoshi Fujita *	Japan	0	4	2	2	12	1	314	Seattle 1998 (Worlds)
Ryan Fuller	Canada	0	2	5	3	9	1	194	Atlanta 1996
Donald Gallitz	United States	0	1	3	0	0		117	Dallas 1996
Andreas Ganz	Switzerland	0	0	37	1	2	1	163	London 2005
Justin Gary	United States	1	3	1	1	3	1	252	Seattle 1997 (Worlds)
Svend Geertsen	Denmark	0	4	3	0	1	8	163	Seattle 1996 (Worlds)
Gerardo Godinez	Mexico	0	0	17	0	2	2	127	Los Angeles 1999
Simon Görtzen	Germany	1	1	1	0	1	4	123	Venice 2003
Sam Gomersall	United Kingdom	0	0	5^{[III]}	1	3	1	123	Osaka 2002
Daniel Gräfensteiner	Germany	0	1	5	1	1	1	129	Geneva 2007
Christophe Gregoir	Belgium	0	1	5	0	1	6	125	New Orleans 2003
Thomas Guevin	United States	0	1	2	0	0		142	Los Angeles 1996
Brian Hacker	United States	0	2	3	0	3	2	137	Los Angeles 1996
Jesse Hampton	United States	0	2	4	1	1	1	130	Philadelphia 2011
Yann Hamon	France	0	1	3	2	3	1	123	Paris 1997
Eugene Harvey	United States	0	4	2	1	5	1	205	Toronto 2001 (Worlds)
Alexander Hayne	Canada	1	1	1	4	11	1	312	Philadelphia 2011
Mark Herberholz	United States	1	4	1	0	4	2	205	Osaka 2002
Nicolai Herzog *	Norway	2	5	1	0	3	2	289	Seattle 1998 (Worlds)
Kazuya Hirabayashi	Japan	0	0	9	0	3	2	117	Los Angeles 2001
Ken Ho	United States	1	1	1	1	2	1	117	Chicago 2000
Richard Hoaen	Canada	0	1	8	4	9	1	281	Los Angeles 2001
Nathan Holiday	United States	0	0	11	1	4	1	122	San Diego 2013 (Dragon's Maze)
Thomas Holzinger	Austria	0	1	7	0	3	5	122	Berlin 2008
Tommi Hovi *	Finland	2	4	1	0	1	2	225	Seattle 1996 (Worlds)
Mike Hron	United States	1	2	1	3	5	1	184	Chicago 1999
Huang Hao-Shan	Taiwan	0	0	14	1	8	1	234	Kyoto 2009
David Humpherys *	United States	1	5	1	2	5	1	292	New York 1996
Masami Ibamoto	United States	0	1	3	0	4	3	105	Mainz 1997
Yuuki Ichikawa	Japan	0	2	4	1	8	3	160	San Diego 2013 (Dragon's Maze)
Yoshihiko Ikawa	Japan	0	1	6	0	1	4	128	Yokohama 2007
Tsuyoshi Ikeda	Japan	0	4	2	1	6	1	313	New York 1998
Itaru Ishida	Japan	0	1	2	2	17	1	250	Paris 1997
Jun'ya Iyanaga	Japan	1	1	1	1	5	1	143	Kuala Lumpur 2008
Michael Jacob	United States	0	1	3	0	4	5	161	Kobe 2004
Adam Jansen	United States	0	0		2	3	1	113	Columbus 1996
Lukas Jaklovsky	Czech Republic	0	1	6	0	3	2	166	Geneva 2007
William Jensen *	United States	1	5	1	4	22	1	427	Rome 1998
Scott Johns	United States	1	5	1	0	2	2	164	Los Angeles 1996
Craig Jones	United Kingdom	0	1	2	1	1	1	101	Rome 1998
Anton Jonsson *	Sweden	0	5	2	1	9	1	221	Tokyo 2001
Dan Jordan	United States	0	0	13	0	4	3	127	Austin 2009
Matthias Jorstedt	Sweden	1	3	1	0	2	3	178	Atlanta 1996
Robert Jurkovic	(Slovakia) Slovak Republic	0	0	6^{[IV]}	0	2	3	194	Mainz 1997
Mark Justice	United States	0	4	2	0	0		133	New York 1996
Martin Jůza *	Czech Republic	0	3	6	5	30	1	592	New Orleans 2003
Tomohiro Kaji	Japan	1	3	1	1	3	1	152	New Orleans 2003
Frank Karsten *	Netherlands	0	3	2	0	7	2	424	Brussels 2000 (Worlds)
Darwin Kastle *	United States	1	8	1	2	11	1	387	New York 1996
Matthias Kettil	Sweden	0	1	4	0	1	4	112	New York 2000 (1999–2000 season)
Brian Kibler *	United States	2	5	1	3	13	1	450	Chicago 1997
Masaya Kitayama	Japan	0	0	20	1	3	1	118	Charleston 2006
Benedikt Klauser	Austria	0	3	3	1	1	1	145	Los Angeles 1997
Shu Komuro	Japan	1	1	1	2	6	1	185	Tokyo 2001
André Konstanczer	Germany	0	1	8	0	2	3	120	Atlanta 1996
Mateusz Kopeć	Poland	0	0	11	1	1	1	110	Paris 2006 (Worlds)
Grzegorz Kowalski	Poland	0	0		0	2	6	104	
Gary Krakower	Canada	0	0	11	1	3	1	110	Seattle 1996 (Worlds)
Wenzel Krautmann	Germany	0	0		1	5	1	106	Houston 2002
Craig Krempels	United States	0	0	9	0	2	2	134	Boston 2002
Peer Kröger	Germany	0	3	3	0	2	7	100	Seattle 1996 (Worlds)
Janosch Kühn	Germany	0	2	2	0	2	5	104	Seattle 1997 (Worlds)
Matthias Künzler	Switzerland	0	0	16	0	4	5	134	Boston 2002
Kuo Tzu-Ching	Taiwan	0	0	10	0	11	2	262	Chicago 2000
Shingou Kurihara	Japan	0	1	4	1	5	1	167	London 2005
Masashiro Kuroda	Japan	1	2	1	2	8	1	144	Yokohama 1999 (Worlds)
Nicolas Labarre	France	0	4	2	1	4	1	169	Rome 1998
Dan Lanthier	Canada	0	0		2	2	1	129	Hollywood 2008
John Larkin	(Republic of Ireland) Ireland	0	3	4	0	0		127	Seattle 1997 (Worlds)
Joel Larsson	Sweden	1	2	1	1	6	1	279	San Diego 2010
Albertus Law	Singapore	0	1	6	2	4	1	116	Osaka 2002
Ari Lax	United States	1	1	1	1	9	1	264	Kyoto 2009
Osyp Lebedowicz	United States	1	3	1	1	5	1	247	New Orleans 2001
Lee Shi Tian *	Hong Kong	0	5	4	1	10	1	354	Kyoto 2009
Arjan van Leeuwen	Netherlands	0	0	20	2	3	1	109	New York 2001
Peter Leiher	United States	0	0	9	0	1	7	107	New York 1996
Vincent Lemoine	Belgium	0	1	3	0	2	2	139	Venice 2003
Mark Le Pine	United States	0	3	2	0	2	3	133	Los Angeles 1997
Raphaël Lévy *	France	0	3	4	6	22	1	705	Paris 1997
Matthew Linde	United States	1	2	1	0	3	2	170	Chicago 1997
Tommi Lindgren	Switzerland	0	0		0	3	6	100	Brussels 2000 (Worlds)
Scott Lipp	United States	0	0		1	4	1	100	
Tom van de Logt	Netherlands	1	2	1	1	4	1	125	Seattle 1998 (Worlds)
Raffaele Lo Moro	Italy	0	2	3	0	0		129	Los Angeles 1998
Michael Long	United States	1	4	1	1	4	1	191	New York 1996
Benjamin Lundquist	United States	0	0	18	0	6	2	136	Honolulu 2006
Marijn Lybaert	Belgium	0	4	4	0	3	2	207	Boston 2003
Rogier Maaten	Netherlands	0	0	6^{[V]}	0	3	2	113	Berlin 2003 (Worlds)
Valentin Mackl	Austria	0	0	13	0	5	2	183	Paris 2011
Bob Maher *	United States	1	4	1	3	10	1	296	Los Angeles 1997
Alex Majlaton	United States	0	0	34	0	8	2	197	Honolulu 2006
Michael Majors	United States	0	0	14	1	4	1	156	Nagoya 2011
Pierre Malherbaud	France	0	0	7^{[VI]}	1	2	1	126	Chicago 1997
Antti Malin	Finland	1	2	1	0	1	5	158	Barcelona 2001
Seth Manfield *	United States	0	2	3	5	11	1	313	Geneva 2007
Tom Martell	United States	1	2	1	3	9	1	304	Chicago 2000
Quentin Martin	United Kingdom	0	1	8	0	4	3	127	Tokyo 2001
Guillaume Matignon	France	1	2	1	0	0		126	Yokohama 2003
Pascal Maynard	Canada	0	2	2	2	12	1	199	Chiba 2010 (Worlds)
Casey McCarrel	United States	1	3	1	1	3	1	124	Los Angeles 1998
Josh McClain	United States	0	0	11	1	5	1	153	Nagoya 2011
Shaun McLaren	Canada	1	2	1	0	4	3	184	Prague 2006
Robert Van Medevoort	Netherlands	0	0	20	0	1	2	155	London 2005
Patrick Mello	Germany	0	2	4	0	5	2	129	Los Angeles 1999
Antoine Menard	France	0	0	8 ^{[VII]}	0	0		120	New York 2000 (1999–2000 season)
Andrea Mengucci	Italy	0	3	2	0	0		218	Austin 2009
Makihito Mihara *	Japan	1	5	1	2	10	1	404	Venice 2003
Kazuya Mitamura	Japan	1	3	1	0	2	2	172	Prague 2006
Katsuhiro Mori	Japan	1	3	1	4	15	1	336	Los Angeles 2001
Masahiko Morita	Japan	0	0	11	4	16	1	215	Toronto 2001 (Worlds)
Zvi Mowshowitz *	United States	1	4	1	2	9	1	319	Los Angeles 1998
Andre Müller	Germany	0	2	2	0	3	2	151	Venice 2003
Martin Müller	Denmark	0	1	8	0	2	4	148	Austin 2009
Tamás Nagy	Hungary	0	0	25	1	3	1	132	Berlin 2003 (Worlds)
Nam Sung-wook	South Korea	0	1	2	1	3	1	105	Memphis 2008 (Worlds)
Chikara Nakajima	Japan	0	2	3	0	3	2	180	Chicago 1999
Satoshi Nakamura	Japan	0	0	11	1	7	1	100	Seattle 1996 (Worlds)
Shuhei Nakamura *	Japan	0	6	2	7	27	1	682	San Diego 2002
Yoshitaka Nakano	Japan	0	1	6	0	2	2	118	Venice 2003
Matthew Nass	United States	0	1	6	3	8	1	205	San Diego 2010
Gabriel Nassif *	France	2	9	1	1	6	1	538	Chicago 2000
Jeremy Neeman	Australia	0	1	8	2	4	1	119	Hollywood 2008
Brad Nelson	United States	0	3	2	3	18	1	443	Honolulu 2009
Eivind Nitter	Norway	1	1	1	0	4	2	167	Los Angeles 1999
Julien Nuijten	Netherlands	1	1	1	2	5	1	139	San Francisco 2004 (Worlds)
David Ochoa	United States	0	1	3	0	7	4	334	Philadelphia 2005
Kenny Öberg	Sweden	0	1	4	1	3	1	175	San Francisco 2004 (Worlds)
Rickard Österberg	Sweden	1	2	1	1	3	1	126	Chicago 1999
Ryo Ogura	Japan	0	2	2	0	6	2	110	Tokyo 2001
Masashi Oiso *	Japan	0	6	2	1	10	1	297	Boston 2002
Jin Okamoto	Japan	0	2	2	0	5	2	185	Mainz 1997
Daniel O'Mahoney-Schwartz	United States	0	1	3	1	6	1	103	Chicago 1998
Steven O'Mahoney-Schwartz *	United States	1	3	1	4	10	1	245	Columbus 1996
Wessel Oomens	Netherlands	0	0	6^{[V]}	1	4	1	103	Paris 1997
Koutarou Ootsuka	Japan	0	2	4	0	7	3	189	Sydney 2002 (Worlds)
Greg Orange	United States	0	0		1	3	1	113	
Takuya Osawa	Japan	1	2	1	0	6	3	160	Amsterdam 2004
Diego Ariel Ostrovich	Argentina	0	1	3	1	3	1	111	Brussels 2000 (Worlds)
Sam Pardee	United States	0	1	3	2	10	1	207	Nagoya 2011
Jamie Parke	United States	0	3	2	0	4	3	210	Chicago 1997
Brock Parker	United States	1	1	1	2	9	1	255	Los Angeles 1999
Mario Pascoli	Italy	0	1	2	0	3	2	118	Tokyo 2001
John Pelcak	United States	0	1	4	1	4	1	101	Boston 2003
Christopher Pikula	United States	0	3	4	0	5	2	162	New York 1996
Florian Pils	Germany	0	1	8	0	3	2	124	Yokohama 2003
Oliver Polak-Rottmann	Austria	0	0	15	1	4	1	169	Columbus 2004
Alessandro Portaro	Italy	0	1	8	0	1	7	101	Columbus 2004
David Price	United States	1	1	1	0	3	2	163	New York 1996
Andrejs Prost	Latvia	0	2	7	1	3	1	137	Honolulu 2009
Michael Pustilnik	United States	1	3	1	2	7	1	208	Los Angeles 1996
Denniz Rachid	Sweden	0	2	5	0	2	7	131	Berlin 2003 (Worlds)
Olle Råde *	Sweden	1	5	1	1	1	1	219	Columbus 1996
Joshua Ravitz	United States	0	0	8^{[VIII]}	0	3	3	140	New York 2001
Neil Reeves	United States	0	2	3	0	2	4	154	New York 1997
Shawn Regnier	United States	1	2	1	0	0		101	New York 1996
David Reitbauer	Austria	0	1	2	0	0		130	New Orleans 2003
Jeroen Remie	Netherlands	1	3	1	0	3	4	175	Toronto 2001 (Worlds)
Paul Rietzl *	United States	1	4	1	2	17	1	446	Osaka 2002
Carlos Romão	Brazil	1	2	1	5	9	1	288	New York 1999
Kyle Rose	United States	1	4	1	1	2	1	176	Dallas 1996
Tom Ross	United States	0	1	8	0	4	2	105	New Orleans 2001
Ben Rubin *	United States	0	4	2	2	8	1	371	Los Angeles 1998
Steve Rubin	United States	1	1	1	0	6	2	203	Montreal 2013 (Gatecrash)
Antoine Ruel *	France	1	4	1	2	18	1	412	Washington 1999
Olivier Ruel *	France	0	5	2	5	28	1	532	Rome 1998
Jan Rueß	Germany	0	2	2	0	0		113	Honolulu 2006
Johan Sadeghpour	Sweden	0	1	3	0	1	4	176	New York 2000 (2000–01 season)
Tomoharu Saitou	Japan	1	5	1	4	25	1	522	Chicago 2000
Eduardo Sajgalik	Canada	0	2	4	0	4	4	180	Geneva 2007
Eduardo dos Santos Vieira	Brazil	0	0		0	4	1	108	Austin 2009
Thiago Saporito	Brazil	0	1	3	0	2	5	148	Berlin 2008
Luis Scott-Vargas *	United States	1	10	1	5	15	1	508	San Diego 2004
Benjamin Seck	Australia	0	1	7	2	3	1	113	New York 1997
Brian Selden	United States	1	3	1	0	0		105	Seattle 1998 (Worlds)
Matthew Severa	United States	0	0		3	7	1	136	Los Angeles 1999
David Sharfman	United States	1	1	1	0	4	2	161	Atlanta 2005
Shahar Shenhar	Israel	0	0	22	3	9	1	267	Paris 2011
Dave Shiels	United States	0	0		1	5	1	103	
Naoki Shimizu	Japan	0	2	3	0	1	5	119	Kobe 2006
Ryouma Shiozu	Japan	0	0	16	0	6	3	101	London 1999
Alex Shvartsman	United States	0	1	3	4	21	1	233	Los Angeles 1997
Rasmus Sibast	Denmark	0	1	5	0	2	7	109	Yokohama 2003
Mike Sigrist	United States	0	2	2	2	6	1	230	Los Angeles 1999
Chapman Sim	Singapore	0	0	59	0	4	2	125	Kobe 2006
Timothée Simonot	France	0	0	12	1	3	1	114	Paris 2011
Lucas Siow	Canada	0	0		1	4	1	101	Kyoto 2009
Geoffrey Siron	Belgium	1	2	1	0	2	3	161	Osaka 2002
John Sittner	United States	0	0	17	0	2	4	158	Honolulu 2006
Jakub Slemr	Czech Republic	1	3	1	1	4	1	164	Seattle 1996 (Worlds)
Bram Snepvangers *	Netherlands	0	4	2	0	8	2	387	Seattle 1997 (Worlds)
Petr Sochůrek	Czech Republic	0	0		2	5	1	140	Valencia 2014 (Born of the Gods)
Terry Soh	Malaysia	0	3	3	0	3	2	160	Berlin 2003 (Worlds)
Jonathan Sonne	United States	0	1	4	2	7	1	207	Chicago 2000
Shaheen Soorani	United States	0	0		0	1	3	109	Chicago 2000
Matthew Sperling	United States	0	2	4	1	6	1	242	New York 2000 (1999–2000 season)
Ben Stark *	United States	1	4	1	2	22	1	474	London 1999
Jon Stern	Canada	0	0	13	2	8	1	212	Chicago 2000
Ondřej Stráský	Czech Republic	0	2	3	0	1	4	166	Honolulu 2012 (Dark Ascension)
Adrian Sullivan	United States	0	1	4	0	2	3	126	Los Angeles 1998
Helmut Summersberger	Austria	0	1	6	2	4	1	205	London 1999
Gadiel Szleifer	United States	1	3	1	1	4	1	139	New Orleans 2003
Yuuta Takahashi	Japan	0	2	2	3	8	1	279	Los Angeles 2005
Kazuyuki Takimura	Japan	1	1	1	1	4	1	112	Atlanta 2014 (Journey into Nyx)
Ryoichi Tamada	Japan	0	1	2	0	4	3	144	Amsterdam 2010
Aleksa Telarov	Serbia	0	0		1	3	1	136	New York 2007 (Worlds)
Amiel Tenenbaum	France	0	1	2	0	2	2	126	New York 2001
Sebastian Thaler	Germany	0	2	4	1^{[IX]}	3^{[IX]}	1^{[IX]}	170	Prague 2006
Gerry Thompson	United States	0	1	7	2	11	1	295	Boston 2002
Mike Thompson	United States	0	0	10	0	1	8	115	New York 1999
Jens Thorén	Sweden	0	2	2	0	4	2	150	New York 2000 (2000–01 season)
Gabriel Tsang	Canada	1	3	1	0	2	2	155	Columbus 1996
Terry Tsang	Canada	0	1	8	0	0		123	Columbus 1996
Kenji Tsumura *	Japan	0	6	2	2	13	1	324	Chicago 2003
Michael Turian *	United States	1	5	1	2	6	1	234	Chicago 1998
Owen Turtenwald *	United States	0	4	2	4	22	1	492	Valencia 2007
Josh Utter-Leyton *	United States	0	5	2	1	10	1	387	Hollywood 2008
Gaudenis Vidugiris	Lithuania	0	2	2	3	8	1	317	Yokohama 2007
Matthew Vienneau	Canada	0	1	8	2	4	1	125	Columbus 1996
Peter Vieren	Belgium	0	0		0	2	2	113	Yokohama 2007
Guillaume Wafo-Tapa *	France	1	5	1	0	6	3	279	Barcelona 2001
Tomi Walamies	Finland	0	3	2	0	1	3	168	Los Angeles 1997
Gabe Walls	United States	0	2	5	0	4	4	138	New Orleans 2001
Ruud Warmenhoven	Netherlands	0	1	7	0	2	4	151	Los Angeles 2001
Yuuya Watanabe *	Japan	0	5	2	7	25	1	643	Yokohama 2007
Craig Wescoe	United States	1	3	1	1	10	1	343	Washington 1999
Jelger Wiegersma *	Netherlands	1	5	1	2	15	1	461	New York 1999
David Williams	United States	0	1	7	3	10	1	231	Chicago 1997
Jacob Wilson	Canada	0	2	2	3	8	1	227	Philadelphia 2011
Gary Wise *	Canada	1	4	1	0	0		249	Dallas 1996
Conley Woods	United States	0	2	3	1	6	1	197	New York 2007 (Worlds)
Stuart Wright	United Kingdom	0	0	10	0	0		109	New Orleans 2001
Yam Wing Chun	Hong Kong	0	0		0	2	3	106	
Kentaro Yamamoto	Japan	0	3	2	1	9	1	243	San Diego 2004
Shouta Yasooka *	Japan	2	4	1	1	20	1	600	Barcelona 2001
Ken Yukuhiro	Japan	0	4	3	1	8	1	325	Kyoto 2009
Adam Yurchick	United States	0	0	9	1	6	1	177	Philadelphia 2005
Matej Zatlkaj	(Slovakia) Slovak Republic	0	2	2	1	2	1	208	Berlin 2003 (Worlds)
Arnost Zidek	Czech Republic	0	1	7	0	1	6	117	Sydney 2002 (Worlds)

As of 11 May 2017

== Notes ==
^I David Brucker finished 6th with teammates Sebastian Thaler and Helmut Summersberger at 2006 Pro Tour Charleston. For team events, top 4 finishes are regarded as equivalent to an individual top 8 finish as the final elimination stage involves four teams.
^II Igor Frayman finished 7th with teammates Gabriel Tsang and Brian Hacker at 2000 Pro Tour New York. For team events, top 4 finishes are regarded as equivalent to an individual top 8 finish as the final elimination stage involves four teams.
^III Sam Gomersall finished 5th with teammates John Larkin and Patrick Mello at 2003 Pro Tour Boston. For team events, top 4 finishes are regarded as equivalent to an individual top 8 finish as the final elimination stage involves four teams.
^IV Robert Jurkovic finished 6th with teammate Arnost Zidek at 2007 Pro Tour San Diego. For team events, top 4 finishes are regarded as equivalent to an individual top 8 finish as the final elimination stage involves four teams.
^V Rogier Maaten and Wessel Oomens finished 6th with teammate Julien Nuijten at 2005 Pro Tour Atlanta. For team events, top 4 finishes are regarded as equivalent to an individual top 8 finish as the final elimination stage involves four teams.
^VI Pierre Malherbaud finished 7th with teammates Thomas Shaw and Karim Aouidad at 2002 Pro Tour Boston. For team events, top 4 finishes are regarded as equivalent to an individual top 8 finish as the final elimination stage involves four teams.
^VII Antoine Menard finished 8th with teammates Dario Minieri and Nicolas Labarre at 2003 Pro Tour Boston. For team events, top 4 finishes are regarded as equivalent to an individual top 8 finish as the final elimination stage involves four teams.
^VIII Joshua Ravitz finished 8th with teammates Igor Frayman and Chris Pikula at 2004 Pro Tour Seattle. For team events, top 4 finishes are regarded as equivalent to an individual top 8 finish as the final elimination stage involves four teams.
^IX Sebastian Thaler's Grand Prix achievements are listed under the name Sebastian Aljiaj.
