= Magic: The Gathering Pro Tour season 2006 =

2006 Pro Tour season
- Pro Player of the Year: (Japan) Shouta Yasooka
- Rookie of the Year: (Germany) Sebastian Thaler
- World Champion: (Japan) Makihito Mihara
- Pro Tours: 5
- Grands Prix: 22
- Hall of Fame inductions: Bob Maher, Jr. Dave Humpherys; Raphaël Lévy; Gary Wise; Rob Dougherty
- Start of season: 10 December 2005
- End of season: 3 December 2006

The 2006 Pro Tour season was the eleventh season of the Magic: The Gathering Pro Tour. On 18 December 2005 the season began with parallel Grand Prixs in Lille and Charlotte. It ended on 3 December 2006 with the conclusion of the 2006 World Championship in Paris. The season consisted of 22 Grand Prixs and 5 Pro Tours, held in Honolulu, Prague, Charleston, Kobe, and Paris. At the end of the season Shouta Yasooka from Japan was proclaimed Pro Player of the year. At the Worlds in Paris the second class of the Hall of Fame was inducted. The inductees were Bob Maher, Jr., Dave Humpherys, Raphaël Lévy, Gary Wise, and Rob Dougherty.

== Grand Prixs – Lille, Charlotte, Hasselt, Richmond, Dortmund ==
GP Lille (18–19 December)

- Format: Legacy
- Attendance: 939
1. (Austria) Helmut Summersberger
2. (Czech Republic) Daniel Krutil
3. (France) Nicholas Labarre
4. (Italy) Luca Verdiani
5. (Germany) Martin Brenner
6. (France) Loïc Le Briand
7. (Germany) Max Bracht
8. (France) Nicolas Francois

GP Charlotte (18–19 December)

- Format: Extended
- Attendance: 456
1. (United States) Michael Krumb
2. (United States) Alex Majlaton
3. (United States) Kyle Goodman
4. (United States) David Shiels
5. (United States) Antonino De Rosa
6. Alan Hubbard
7. (United States) Chris Boozer
8. (United States) Thomas LaPille

GP Hasselt (28–29 January)

- Format: Limited
- Attendance: 1070
1. (England) Sam Gomersall
2. (France) Julien Goron
3. (Netherlands) Maurice Palijama
4. (Slovenia) Ziga Fritz
5. (Germany) Helge Nelson
6. (Netherlands) Dimitri Reinderman
7. (England) Quentin Martin
8. (France) Francois Moreau

GP Richmond (4–5 February)

- Format: Limited
- Attendance: 558
1. (Canada) Richard Hoaen
2. (United States) Jonathan Sonne
3. (United States) Adam Chambers
4. (United States) John Fiorillo
5. (United States) Eugene Harvey
6. (United States) Taylor Webb
7. (United States) Gerry Thompson
8. (United States) Michael Pinnegar

GP Dortmund (18–19 February)

- Format: Limited
- Attendance: 1029
1. (Germany) David Brucker
2. (France) Julien Goron
3. (Germany) Mathias Wigge
4. (Germany) Marco Rothaupt
5. (Germany) Dennis Grudowski
6. (Netherlands) Julien Nuijten
7. (France) Olivier Ruel
8. (Germany) Stefan Rentzsch

== Pro Tour – Honolulu (3–5 March 2006) ==
Mark Herberholz won Pro Tour Honolulu piloting a green/red aggro-deck. He defeated Craig Jones in the finals. The final eight included both Ruel brothers, Antoine and Olivier. Notably absent from the Top 8 were the Japanese players after thirteen consecutive final day appearances.

=== Tournament data ===
Prize pool: $240,245
Players: 410
Format: Standard
Head Judge: John Shannon

=== Top 8 ===
Quarter-finals
1	Craig Jones	3
8	Antoine Ruel	0
4	Max Bracht	2
5	Olivier Ruel	3
2	Osyp Lebedowicz	1
7	Mark Herberholz	3
3	Tiago Chan	3
6	Ruud Warmenhoven	0

Semi-finals
Craig Jones	3
Olivier Ruel	2
Mark Herberholz	3
Tiago Chan	1

Finals
Craig Jones	2
Mark Herberholz	3

=== Final standings ===
Place	Player	Prize	Pro Points	Comment
1	(United States) Mark Herberholz	$40,000	25	3rd Final day
2	(England) Craig Jones	$22,000	20	
3	(Portugal) Tiago Chan	$15,000	16	
4	(France) Olivier Ruel	$14,000	16	5th Final day
5	(United States) Osyp Lebedowicz	$11,500	12	3rd Final day
6	(Germany) Max Bracht	$11,000	12	
7	(Netherlands) Ruud Warmenhoven	$10,500	12	
8	(France) Antoine Ruel	$10,000	12	4th Final day

=== Pro Player of the year standings ===
Rank	Player	Pro Points
1	(United States) Mark Herberholz	28
2	(France) Olivier Ruel	22
3	(England) Craig Jones	20
4	(Portugal) Tiago Chan	18
5	(Germany) Max Bracht	15

== Grand Prixs – Manila, Cardiff, Madison, Hamamatsu, Barcelona ==
GP Manila (18–19 March)

- Format: Limited
- Attendance: 368
1. (Philippines) James Porter
2. (Philippines) Jiro Francisco
3. (South Korea) Cynic Kim
4. (China) Bo Sun
5. (Australia) Jake Hart
6. (Philippines) Felix Gonzales
7. (Japan) Takuya Osawa
8. (Philippines) Dominic Ortega

GP Cardiff (25–26 March)

- Format: Limited
- Attendance: 370
1. (England) Martin Dingler
2. (Germany) Wesimo Al-Bacha
3. (Netherlands) Roel van Heeswijk
4. (Scotland) Julian Jardine
5. (England) Quentin Martin
6. (Netherlands) Bram Snepvangers
7. (France) Raphaël Lévy
8. (France) Antoine Ruel

GP Madison (25–26 March)

- Format: Team Unified Standard
- Attendance: 456 (152 teams)

1. Faddy Josh

(United States) Brian Ziegler
(United States) Tim Bulger
(United States) Takanobu Sato

2. Free James Beeton

(United States) Kyle Goodman
(United States) Mark Ioli
(United States) Benjamin Lundquist

3. 4815162342

(Canada) Richard Hoaen
(United States) Eric Froehlich
(United States) Bob Maher, Jr.

4. Cedric Philips Stole My Bike

(United States) John Pelcak
(United States) Chris McDaniel
(United States) Jonathan Sonne

GP Hamamatsu (8–9 April)

- Format: Team Unified Standard
- Attendance: 495 (165 teams)

1. Tanii Monogatari

(Japan) Kotatsu Saitou
(Japan) Takahiro Katayama
(Japan) Yuusuke Tanii

2. Stardust Crusader

(Japan) Akira Asahara
(Japan) Masaya Kitayama
(Japan) Shouta Yasooka

3. Limit Break

(Japan) Takuya Oosawa
(Japan) Ryou Ogura
(Japan) Itaru Ishida

4. Kiosk

(Japan) Takashi Ishihara
(Japan) Shuhei Itou
(Japan) Daisuke Saitou

GP Barcelona (8–9 April)

- Format: Limited
- Attendance: 1208
1. (Austria) Helmut Summersberger
2. (France) Raphaël Lévy
3. (Netherlands) Jelger Wiegersma
4. (Sweden) Johan Sadeghpour
5. (France) Olivier Ruel
6. (Spain) Aniol Alcaraz
7. (France) Jean Charles Salvin
8. (Germany) Sebastian Aljiaj

== Pro Tour – Prague (5–7 May 2006) ==
Takuya Osawa won Pro Tour Prague, defeating Aaron Brackmann in the finals. In a Top 8 of rather unknown players Shuhei Nakamura was the only one to have made it to the final stage of a PT before.

=== Tournament data ===
Prize pool: $240,245
Players: 415
Format: Booster Draft (Ravnica-Guildpact-Dissension)
Head Judge: Jaap Brouwer

=== Top 8 ===
Quarter-finals
1	Takuya Osawa	3
8	Joe Crosby	0
4	Shuhei Nakamura	3
5	Antonino De Rosa	2
2	Christian Hüttenberger	3
7	Quentin Martin	2
3	Aaron Brackmann	3
6	Rasmus Sibast	2

Semi-finals
Takuya Osawa	3
Shuhei Nakamura	1
Christian Hüttenberger	0
Aaron Brackmann	3

Finals
Takuya Osawa	3
Aaron Brackmann	0

=== Final standings ===
Place	Player	Prize	Pro Points	Comment
1	(Japan) Takuya Osawa	$40,000	25	
2	(Germany) Aaron Brackmann	$22,000	20	
3	(Japan) Shuhei Nakamura	$15,000	16	3rd Final day
4	(Germany) Christian Hüttenberger	$14,000	16	
5	(Denmark) Rasmus Sibast	$11,500	12	
6	(United States) Antonino De Rosa	$11,000	12	
7	(United States) Joe Crosby	$10,500	12	
8	(England) Quentin Martin	$10,000	12	

=== Pro Player of the year standings ===
Rank	Player	Pro Points
1	(United States) Mark Herberholz	32
1	(France) Olivier Ruel	32
3	(Japan) Takuya Osawa	30
4	(England) Craig Jones	24
4	(England) Quentin Martin	24

== Grand Prixs – Torino, Toronto, Kuala Lumpur ==
GP Torino (3–4 June)

- Format: Limited
- Attendance: 656
1. (Switzerland) Nico Bohny
2. (France) Antoine Ruel
3. (Netherlands) Bram Snepvangers
4. (Germany) Klaus Jöns
5. (Italy) Marco Lombardi
6. (France) Guillaume Wafo-Tapa
7. (Italy) Giacomo Mallamaci
8. (France) Pierre Canali

GP Toronto (3–4 June)

- Format: Limited
- Attendance: 504
1. (United States) Antonino De Rosa
2. (United States) Jonathan Sonne
3. (United States) Kyle Sanchez
4. (United States) Mark Lovin
5. (United States) John Fiorillo
6. (United States) Brad Taulbee
7. (Canada) Jay Jiang
8. (Netherlands) Jelger Wiegersma

GP Kuala Lumpur (3–4 June)

- Format: Limited
- Attendance:316
1. (Japan) Kenji Tsumura
2. (Japan) Osamu Fujita
3. (England) Quentin Martin
4. (Netherlands) Ruud Warmenhoven
5. (Malaysia) Terry Soh
6. (Japan) Shouta Yasooka
7. (South Korea) Cynic Kim
8. (Japan) Itaru Ishida

== Pro Tour – Charleston (16–18 June 2006) ==
The Japanese team "Kajiharu80" won Pro Tour Charleston, defeating the Brazilian team "Raaala Pumba" in the final. "Kajiharu80" consisted of Tomohiro Kaji, Shouta Yasooka, and Tomoharu Saitou. With 525 competitors in 175 teams Pro Tour Charleston was the biggest Pro Tour ever. It was also the only Team Constructed Pro Tour ever.

=== Tournament data ===
Players: 525 (175 teams)
Prize Pool: $234,000
Format: 3-Person Team Block Constructed (Ravnica, Guildpact, Dissension)
Head Judge: Sheldon Menery

=== Top 4 ===
Semifinals
1	Raaala Pumba	2
4	Big Timing With Big Oots	1
3	Kajiharu80	2
2	D-25	1

Semi-finals
Raaala Pumba	1
Kajiharu80	2

=== Final standings ===
Place	Team	Player	Prize	Pro Points	Comment
1	Kajiharu80	(Japan) Tomohiro Kaji	$75,000	20	3rd Final day
1	Kajiharu80	(Japan) Shouta Yasooka	$75,000	20	
1	Kajiharu80	(Japan) Tomoharu Saitou	$75,000	20	2nd Final day
2	Raaala Pumba	(Brazil) Celso Zampere	$36,000	16	
2	Raaala Pumba	(Brazil) Willy Edel	$36,000	16	
2	Raaala Pumba	(Brazil) Paulo Vitor Damo da Rosa	$36,000	16	
3	D-25	(Japan) Chikura Nakajima	$21,000	12	
3	D-25	(Japan) Ryuichi Arita	$21,000	12	4th Final day
3	D-25	(Japan) Kazuya Mitamura	$21,000	12	
4	Big Timing With Big Oots	(United States) Chris McDaniel	$18,000	12	2nd Final day
4	Big Timing With Big Oots	(United States) Gadiel Szleifer	$18,000	12	3rd Final day
4	Big Timing With Big Oots	(United States) John Pelcak	$18,000	12	

== Grand Prixs – Toulouse, St. Louis, Malmo, Hiroshima, Phoenix, Sydney, Athens ==
GP Toulouse (24–25 June)

- Format: Limited
- Attendance: 674
1. (Japan) Kenji Tsumura
2. (Belgium) Marijn Lybaert
3. (Japan) Shuhei Nakamura
4. (Spain) Adrian Olivera
5. (France) Julien Soum
6. (France) Olivier Ruel
7. (Japan) Shouta Yasooka
8. (France) Thomas Didierjean

GP St. Louis (22–23 July)

- Format: Limited
- Attendance:466
1. (Japan) Shuhei Nakamura
2. (United States) Zac Hill
3. (Japan) Kenji Tsumura
4. (United States) Chris Fennell
5. (United States) Alex Kim
6. (United States) Pierre Mondon
7. (United States) Dalton King
8. (Canada) Jeremy Kunkel

GP Malmo (22–23 July)

- Format: Limited
- Attendance: 539
1. (Netherlands) Wessel Oomens
2. (Greece) Vasilis Fatouros
3. (Netherlands) Wilco Pinkster
4. (Sweden) Axel Berglund
5. (Netherlands) Jelger Wiegersma
6. (Netherlands) Kamiel Cornelissen
7. (Portugal) André Coimbra
8. (Denmark) Asbjørn Fallesen

GP Hiroshima (19–20 August)

- Format: Limited
- Attendance: 417
1. (Japan) Shuhei Nakamura
2. (Portugal) André Coimbra
3. (Japan) Takahiro Suzuki
4. (England) Basam Tebet
5. (Netherlands) Julien Nuijten
6. (Japan) Kentarou Nonaka
7. (Japan) Ichirou Shimura
8. (Japan) Yuusuke Wakisaka

GP Phoenix (2–3 September)

- Format: Limited
- Attendance: 387
1. (Brazil) Carlos Romão
2. (United States) Sean Inoue
3. (France) Raphaël Lévy
4. (United States) Sam Stein
5. (Belgium) Geoffrey Siron
6. (United States) Gadiel Szleifer
7. (Portugal) André Coimbra
8. (Japan) Shu Kumuro

GP Sydney (7–8 October)

- Format: Limited
- Attendance: 213
1. (Australia) James Zhang
2. (Australia) Anatoli Lightfoot
3. (Japan) Tomoharu Saitou
4. (Australia) Jeremy Neeman
5. (Australia) Steven Aplin
6. (Japan) Takuya Oosawa
7. (Japan) Shouta Yasooka
8. (Australia) Hugh Glanville

GP Athens (14–15 October)

- Format: Limited
- Attendance: 469
1. (Germany) Sebastian Aljiaj
2. (Belgium) Vincent Lemoine
3. (Portugal) Marcio Carvalho
4. (France) Guillaume Wafo-Tapa
5. (Germany) David Brucker
6. (France) Antoine Ruel
7. (Greece) Evangelos Papatsarouchas
8. (Germany) Aaron Brackmann

== Pro Tour – Kobe (20–22 October 2006) ==
German Jan-Moritz Merkel won Pro Tour Kobe. It was his first appearance at a Pro Tour.

=== Tournament data ===
Players: 388
Prize Pool: $240,245
Format: Booster Draft (Time Spiral)
Head Judge: John Shannon

=== Top 8 ===
Quarter-finals
Bastien Perez	3
Kenji Tsumura	1
Tomoharu Saitou	2
Jan-Moritz Merkel	3
Thomas Didierjean	3
Bram Snepvangers	2
Takahiro Suzuki	2
Willy Edel	3

Semi-finals
Bastien Perez	1
Jan-Moritz Merkel	3
Thomas Didierjean	1
Willy Edel	3

Finals
1	Jan-Moritz Merkel	3
Willy Edel	1

=== Final standings ===
Place	Player	Prize	Pro Points	Comment
1	(Germany) Jan-Moritz Merkel	$40,000	25	Pro Tour debut
2	(Brazil) Willy Edel	$22,000	20	2nd Final day
3	(France) Bastien Perez	$15,000	16	
4	(France) Thomas Didierjean	$14,000	16	Pro Tour debut
5	(Japan) Kenji Tsumura	$11,500	12	4th Final day
6	(Netherlands) Bram Snepvangers	$11,000	12	3rd Final day
7	(Japan) Tomoharu Saitou	$10,500	12	3rd Final day
8	(Japan) Takahiro Suzuki	$10,000	12	

== Grand Prixs – New Jersey, Yamagata ==
GP New Jersey (11–12 November)

- Format: Limited
- Attendance: 913
1. (Canada) Guillaume Cardin
2. (Canada) Richard Hoaen
3. (United States) Timothy Aten
4. (United States) Jason Imperiale
5. (United States) Gerry Thompson
6. (United States) John Pelcak
7. (United States) Andrew Stokinger
8. (Japan) Shouta Yasooka

GP Yamagata (18–19 November)

- Format: Limited
- Attendance: 359
1. (Japan) Takihiro Suzuki
2. (Japan) Takeshi Ozawa
3. (Netherlands) Jelger Wiegersma
4. (Japan) Katsuhiro Mori
5. (Canada) Richard Hoaen
6. (France) Antoine Ruel
7. (Japan) Ryo Ogura
8. (Japan) Yuu Murakami

== 2006 World Championships – Paris (29 November – 3 December 2006) ==
The tournament began with the Hall of Fame induction of Bob Maher, Jr., Dave Humpherys Raphaël Lévy, Gary Wise, and Rob Dougherty. In an all-Japanese final Makihito Mihara defeated Ryo Ogura. The Dutch team of Kamiel Cornelissen, Julien Nuijten, and Robert van Medevoort won the team finals against Japan.

=== Tournament data ===
Prize pool: $255,245 (individual) + $210,000 (national teams)
Players: 356
Formats: Standard, Booster Draft (Time Spiral), Extended
Head Judge: Jaap Brouwer, Jason Ness

=== Top 8 ===
Quarter-finals
1	Paulo Carvalho	0
8	Ryo Ogura	3
4	Nicholas Lovett	3
5	Katsuhiro Mori	1
2	Paulo Vitor; Damo da Rosa	2
7	Makihito Mihara	3
3	Tiago Chan	2
6	Gabriel Nassif	3

Semi-finals
Ryo Ogura	3
Nicholas Lovett	2
Makihito Mihara	3
Gabriel Nassif	2

Finals
Ryo Ogura	0
Makihito Mihara	3

=== Final standings ===
Place	Player	Prize	Pro Points	Comment
1	(Japan) Makihito Mihara	$50,000	25	
2	(Japan) Ryo Ogura	$25,000	20	2nd Final day
3	(Wales) Nicholas Lovett	$16,000	16	1st Welshmen in a Top 8, Pro Tour debut
4	(France) Gabriel Nassif	$15,000	16	7th Final day
5	(Portugal) Paulo Carvalho	$11,500	12	Pro Tour debut
6	(Brazil) Paulo Vitor Damo da Rosa	$11,000	12	2nd Final day
7	(Portugal) Tiago Chan	$10,500	12	2nd Final day
8	(Japan) Katsuhiro Mori	$10,000	12	2nd Final day

=== National team competition ===
1. The Netherlands (Julien Nuijten, Kamiel Cornelissen, Robert van Medevoort)
2. Japan (Hidenori Katayama, Katsuhiro Mori, Shuhei Yamamoto)

== Pro Player of the year final standings ==
After the World Championship Shouta Yasooka was awarded the Pro Player of the year title.

Rank	Player	Pro Points
1	(Japan) Shouta Yasooka	60
2	(Japan) Shuhei Nakamura	56
3	(Portugal) Tiago Chan	51
3	(Brazil) Paulo Vitor Damo da Rosa	51
5	(Japan) Tomoharu Saitou	50
