= Masashi Oiso =

Japanese Magic: The Gathering player

Masashi Oiso 大礒 正嗣
- Nationality: Japanese
- Pro Tour debut: 2002 Pro Tour Boston
- Winnings: US$140,410
- Pro Tour wins (Top 8): 0 (6)
- Grand Prix wins (Top 8): 1 (10)
- Lifetime Pro Points: 248
- Planeswalker Level: 46 (Archmage)

Masashi Oiso (大礒 正嗣) is a Japanese Magic: The Gathering player. He is one of the most successful players to have played on the Pro Tour, being one of only seven players to have reached the top eight six times. Along with Kenji Tsumura, he is the player with the most top eights to have never won a Pro Tour. In 2012 Oiso was voted into the Magic: The Gathering Hall of Fame. His induction was conducted at Pro Tour Return to Ravnica in October 2012.

== Career ==
Oiso's career began in the 2002–03 season at Pro Tour Boston as part of Hato Beeam with teammates Takao Higaki and Kazuki Ueno. They finished with a record of 6 wins and 5 losses which left them in 26th place, and just one win short of winning money. Oiso's breakout performance came later the same season in his home country. At Pro Tour Yokohama, he reached the top eight for the first time. He made it all the way to final, beating José Barbero and Tsuyoshi Ikeda, before losing to Mattias Jorstedt. It would also be the only time that he would make it past the quarterfinals. This finals appearance, along with a pair of Grand Prix top eights, was enough to earn him the title of Rookie of the Year.

The following season, Oiso proved that the year before was no fluke with Pro Tour top eights in New Orleans and San Diego. With 46 Pro Points that season, he finished 17th in the Player of the year race.

The 2005 season was Oiso's strongest yet. Despite skipping Pro Tour Philadelphia, he was a strong contender for Player of the Year, finishing just three points behind Olivier Ruel, and four behind Kenji Tsumura who won the title. He made two more Pro Tour top eights that season. He finished fifth at Pro Tour Columbus, and at Pro Tour London finished fifth again, losing to Geoffrey Siron who wouldn't lose a single game that day. He finished 3rd at the Japanese national championship that year, and played a leading role in the Japanese national team that won the World Championship.

After the end of the 2005 season, Oiso began to slow down. In 2006, he didn't play every Pro Tour and earned only eighteen pro points, the minimum required to stay qualified. However, when the Pro Tour came to Japan the following year, he showed the world that he was still good. At Pro Tour Yokohama, he reached the top eight for the sixth time. That top eight is regarded as one of the best in quite some time, with every player either having reached top eight before or reaching it again by the end of the next season. Oiso has had no significant finishes on the Pro Tour since. However, he did win the Japanese national championship in 2008.

== Achievements ==
Season	Event type	Location	Format	Date	Rank
2002–03	Grand Prix	Utsunomiya	Rochester Draft	12–13 October 2002	4
2002–03	Grand Prix	Kyoto	Sealed and Booster Draft	29–30 March 2003	3
2002–03	Pro Tour	Yokohama	Booster Draft	9–11 May 2003	2
2003–04	Pro Tour	New Orleans	Extended	31 October–2 November 2003	4
2003–04	Grand Prix	Hong Kong	Booster Draft	7–8 March 2004	3
2003–04	Pro Tour	San Diego	Booster Draft	14–16 May 2004	8
2005	Pro Tour	Columbus, Ohio	Extended	29–30 October 2004	6
2005	Grand Prix	Boston	Extended	5–6 February 2005	1
2005	Grand Prix	Matsuyama	Sealed and Booster Draft	14–15 May 2005	2
2005	Pro Tour	London	Booster Draft	8–10 July 2005	5
2005	Grand Prix	Niigata, Niigata	Block Constructed	23–24 July 2005	4
2005	Grand Prix	Taipei	Block Constructed	6–7 August 2005	7
2005	Nationals	Yokohama	Standard and Booster Draft	2–4 September 2005	3
2005	Grand Prix	Kitakyushu	Extended	5–6 November 2005	4
2005	Grand Prix	Beijing	Extended	26–27 November 2005	2
2005	Worlds	Yokohama	National team	30 November–4 December 2005	1
2007	Pro Tour	Yokohama	Block Constructed	20–22 April 2007	7
2008	Nationals	Yokohama	Standard and Booster Draft	16–18 September 2008	1
2009	Grand Prix	Kitakyushu	Sealed and Booster Draft	31 October–1 November 2009	2

Last updated: 1 November 2009
Source: Event Coverage at Wizards.com

Other accomplishments

- Rookie of the Year 2003

Preceded by (France) Farid Meraghni	Magic: The Gathering Rookie of the Year; 2003	Succeeded by (Netherlands) Julien Nuijten
Preceded by (Germany) Germany; Thorben Twiefel; Sebastian Zink; Roland Bode	Magic: The Gathering Team World Champion; With: Takuma Morofuji; Ichirou Shimura; 2005	Succeeded by (Netherlands) Netherlands; Kamiel Cornelissen; Robert van Medevoort; Julien Nuijten
Preceded by Masaya Kitayama	Magic Japanese National Champion; 2008	Succeeded by Shuhei Nakamura
