= Magic: The Gathering Pro Tour season 2002–03 =

2002–03 Pro Tour season
- Pro Player of the Year: (Germany) Kai Budde
- Rookie of the Year: (Japan) Masashi Oiso
- World Champion: (Germany) Daniel Zink
- Pro Tours: 6
- Grands Prix: 21
- Masters: 4
- Start of season: 24 August 2002
- End of season: 10 August 2003

The 2002–03 Pro Tour season was the eighth season of the Magic: The Gathering Pro Tour. On 24 August 2002 the season began with Grand Prix Sapporo. It ended on 10 August 2003 with the conclusion of the 2003 World Championship in Berlin. The season consisted of 21 Grand Prixs and 6 Pro Tours, held in Boston, Houston, Chicago, Venice, Yokohama, and Berlin. Also Master Series tournaments were held at four Pro Tours. At the end of the season Kai Budde was proclaimed Pro Player of the Year for the third time in a row.

== Grand Prixs – Sapporo, London, Cleveland ==
GP Sapporo (24–25 August)

1. (Japan) Shinichi Kumagai
2. (Japan) Masahiko Morita
3. (Japan) Satoshi Nakamura
4. (Japan) Itaru Ishida
5. (Japan) Kenji Kimoto
6. (Japan) Junichi Kinoshita
7. (Japan) Yuta Hirosawa
8. (Japan) Nobuaki Shikata

GP London (31 August – 1 September)

1. (Czech Republic) Jakub Slemr
2. (Germany) Christoph Hölzl
3. (Netherlands) Bram Snepvangers
4. (England) Craig Stevenson
5. (Portugal) Pedro Velhinho
6. (France) Christophe Haim
7. (Italy) Dario Minieri
8. (France) Gérard Garcia

GP Cleveland (7–8 September)

1. (United States) Valentin Moskovich
2. (Canada) Gabriel Tsang
3. (United States) Jeremy Pinter
4. (United States) Matthew Schrempp
5. (United States) Adam Prosak
6. (United States) Dave Williams
7. (United States) Brian Davis
8. (United States) Rob Dougherty

== Pro Tour – Boston (27–29 September 2002) ==
Boston saw Phoenix Foundation win once again. This put all team members on top in regards to overall Pro Tour victories as no other player had then won more than two Pro Tours. The victory was dryly commented as not surprising anyone anymore.

=== Tournament data ===
Prize pool: $200,100
Players: 363 (121 teams)
Format: Team Sealed (Odyssey, Torment, Judgment) – first day, Team Rochester Draft (Odyssey-Torment-Judgment) – final two days
Head Judge: Nat Fairbanks

=== Top 4 ===
Semi-finals
1	Courtney's Boys	1
4	2020	2
2	Phoenix Foundation	2
3	Slay Pillage Gerard	0

Finals
2020	1
Phoenix Foundation	2

=== Final standings ===
Place	Team	Player	Prize	Pro Points	Comment
1	Phoenix Foundation	(Germany) Dirk Baberowski	$60,000	24	4th Final day, 3rd Pro Tour win
1	Phoenix Foundation	(Germany) Kai Budde	$60,000	24	7th Final day, 6th Pro Tour win
1	Phoenix Foundation	(Germany) Marco Blume	$60,000	24	2nd Final day, 2nd Pro Tour win
2	2020	(Canada) Steven Wolfman	$30,000	18	
2	2020	(Canada) David Rood	$30,000	18	
2	2020	(Canada) Elijah Pollock	$30,000	18	
3	Courtney's Boys	(Canada) Gary Wise	$18,000	12	3rd Final day
3	Courtney's Boys	(United States) Neil Reeves	$18,000	12	2nd Final day
3	Courtney's Boys	(United States) Bob Maher, Jr.	$18,000	12	3rd Final day
4	Slay Pillage Gerrard	(United States) Jonathan Sonne	$15,000	12	
4	Slay Pillage Gerrard	(United States) Gerard Fabiano	$15,000	12	
4	Slay Pillage Gerrard	(United States) Scott McCord	$15,000	12	

=== Pro Player of the year standings ===
Rank	Player	Pro Points
1	(Germany) Dirk Baberowski	24
1	(Germany) Marco Blume	24
1	(Germany) Kai Budde	24
4	(Canada) David Rood	20
5	(Canada) Elijah Pollock	18
5	(Canada) Steven Wolfman	18

== Grand Prixs – Hamburg, Utsonomiya, Copenhagen, Philadelphia ==
GP Hamburg (28–29 September)

1. (Germany) Simon Hockwin
2. (Germany) Arndt Meier
3. (Germany) Jens Krause
4. (Germany) Patrick Plößer
5. (Germany) Nico Wendt
6. (Poland) Piotr Sienko
7. (Germany) Dennis Schmitz
8. (France) Jean Charles Salvin

GP Utsonomiya (12–13 October)

1. (Japan) Rei Hashimoto
2. (Japan) Shuhei Nakamura
3. (Japan) Tsuyoshi Fujita
4. (Japan) Masashi Oiso
5. (Japan) Eiji Nomura
6. (Japan) Masanori Kobayashi
7. (Japan) Jin Okamoto
8. (Japan) Junichi Kinoshita

GP Copenhagen (12–13 October)

1. (United States) Bob Maher, Jr.
2. (Germany) Jens Krause
3. (Germany) Kai Budde
4. (Sweden) Fredrik Boberg
5. (Germany) Dirk Baberowski
6. (Sweden) Jens Thorén
7. (Sweden) David Linder
8. (France) Fleurent Jeudon

GP Philadelphia (26–27 October)

1. (Canada) Jeff Cunningham
2. (United States) Shaun Doran
3. (United States) Eli Aden
4. (United States) Morgan Douglass
5. (United States) Nick Eisel
6. (United States) Craig Krempels
7. (United States) Patrick Sullivan
8. (United States) Jacob Rabinowitz

== Pro Tour – Houston (8–10 November 2002) ==
Pro Tour Houston featured the Extended format. The Ice Age and Mirage-blocks had just rotated out of the format along with 5th Edition, thus removing several of the former key cards from the format. Also Onslaught had become legal for Extended play shortly before the tournament. The most played deck was a "Reanimator"-deck that aimed to get a big creature into the graveyard early via Entomb. Afterwards it would try to get that one into play with Reanimate. Other much-played decks included a combo-deck revolving around Aluren and a green-black midrange control deck called "The Rock".

Justin Gary won Pro Tour Houston with a deck revolving around Oath of Druids. His teammates of "Your Move Games" (YMG), Rob Dougherty and Darwin Kastle, came in second and third. Instead of breaking the format with one kind of deck the YMG players in the top 8 even played all different decks, thereby losing games exclusively to one another. It was Rob Dougherty's fifth final day appearance.

Jens Thorén from Sweden won the final of the Master Series against Gary Wise.

=== Tournament data ===
Prize pool: $200,130
Players: 351
Format: Extended
Head Judge: Rune Horvik

=== Top 8 ===
Quarter-finals
1	Justin Gary	3
8	Jeroen Remie	0
4	John Larkin	3
5	Peter Myrvig	2
2	Rob Dougherty	3
7	Bob Maher, Jr.	0
3	Darwin Kastle	3
6	Mattias Jorstedt	0

Semi-finals
Justin Gary	3
John Larkin	0
Rob Dougherty	3
Darwin Kastle	0

Finals
Justin Gary	3
Rob Dougherty	2

=== Final standings ===
Place	Player	Prize	Pro Points	Comment
1	(United States) Justin Gary	$30,000	32	3rd Final day
2	(United States) Rob Dougherty	$20,000	24	5th Final day
3	(United States) Darwin Kastle	$15,000	16	7th Final day
4	(Republic of Ireland) John Larkin	$13,000	16	3rd Final day
5	(Denmark) Peter Myrvig	$9,500	12	
6	(Sweden) Mattias Jorstedt	$8,500	12	
7	(United States) Bob Maher, Jr.	$7,500	12	4th Final day
8	(Netherlands) Jeroen Remie	$6,500	12	

=== Winner's deck ===
Justin Gary's deck, named Turbo Oath, was designed to get a huge Cognivore into play with Oath of Druids quickly. The deck and sideboard was mainly blue, but also included black and green.

Turbo Oath by Justin Gary – Pro Tour Houston 2002
Main Deck:		Sideboard:
4 Accumulated Knowledge; 4 Brainstorm; 2 Cognivore; 4 Counterspell; 3 Fact or Fiction; 1 Foil; 2 Forbid; 3 Force Spike; 2 Intuition; 1 Krosan Reclamation; 2 Living Wish; 1 Mana Leak; 4 Oath of Druids; 3 Pernicious Deed	2 Forest; 7 Island; 4 Polluted Delta; 1 Swamp; 4 Treetop Village; 2 Underground River; 4 Yavimaya Coast	2 Dust Bowl; 3 Engineered Plague; 2 Gilded Drake; 2 Masticore; 2 Naturalize; 2 Palinchron; 2 Powder Keg

=== Masters – Booster Draft ===
1st Round
Michael Pustilnik
32	Tomi Walamies	2
16	Eric Froehlich	2
17	Christophe Haim
8	Jelger Wiegersma	2
25	Antoine Ruel
9	Brian Davis	2
24	Eugene Harvey
4	Jens Thorén	2
29	Marco Blume
13	Bram Snepvangers
20	Brian Kibler	2
5	Alex Shvartsman	2
28	Neil Reeves
12	Ken Ho
21	Ferad Meraghni	2
2	Kai Budde
31	Alan Shuldiner	2
15	Gary Wise	2
18	Patrick Mello
7	Eivind Nitter	2
26	Peter Szigeti
10	Rob Dougherty
23	Pierre Malherbaud	2
3	Olivier Ruel	2
30	Carlos Romão
14	Dirk Baberowski
19	Raphaël Lévy	2
6	David Humpherys	2
27	Itaru Ishida
11	Anton Jonsson	2
22	Jin Okamoto

2nd Round
Tomi Walamies
Eric Froehlich	2
Jelger Wiegersma	2
Brian Davis
Jens Thorén	2
Brian Kibler
Alex Shvartsman	2
Ferad Meraghni
Allan Shuldiner
Gary Wise	2
Eivind Nitter	2
Pierre Malherbaud
Olivier Ruel
Raphaël Lévy	2
David Humpherys
Anton Jonsson	2

Quarter-finals
Eric Froehlich	2
Jelger Wiegersma
Jens Thorén	2
Alex Shvartsman
Gary Wise	2
Eivind Nitter
Raphaël Lévy	2
Anton Jonsson

Semi-finals
Eric Froehlich
Jens Thorén	2
Gary Wise	2
Raphaël Lévy

Finals
Jens Thorén	2
Gary Wise

=== Pro Player of the year standings ===
Rank	Player	Pro Points
1	(United States) Justin Gary	36
2	(Germany) Dirk Baberowski	34
3	(United States) Bob Maher, Jr.	33
4	(Germany) Kai Budde	31
5	(United States) Rob Dougherty	29

== Grand Prixs – Melbourne, Los Angeles, Reims, New Orleans ==
GP Melbourne (23–24 November)

1. (Australia) Ben Seck
2. (Australia) Tristan Gall
3. (Australia) Jarron Puszet
4. (Australia) Shun Jiang
5. (New Zealand) Richard Grace
6. (Singapore) Milton Jian Xiong Lin
7. (Australia) Chris Allen
8. (China) Jake Hart

GP Los Angeles (23–24 November)

1. (United States) Philip Freneau
2. (United States) Bob Maher, Jr.
3. (United States) Brian Hegstad
4. (United States) Ken Krouner
5. Peter Swarowski
6. Allen Sun
7. (United States) Nick Eisel
8. (Mexico) Gerardo Gordinez Estrada

GP Reims (30 November – 1 December)

1. (Germany) Alex Mack
2. (France) Benjamin Caumes
3. (Germany) Patrick Mello
4. (France) Emmanuel Vernay
5. (Germany) Hans Joachim Hoeh
6. (France) Régis Lavoisier
7. (Germany) Christoph Lippert
8. (Sweden) Anton Jonsson

GP New Orleans (3–4 January)

1. (United States) Zvi Mowshowitz
2. (United States) Eugene Harvey
3. (United States) Michael Pustilnik
4. (Argentina) Diego Ostrovich
5. (Canada) Jeff Cunningham
6. (United States) Morgan Douglass
7. (United States) Carl Lobato
8. (United States) Trey Van Cleave

== Pro Tour – Chicago (17–19 January 2003) ==
In Chicago Kai Budde won his seventh Pro Tour. On his way to the title he defeated, William Jensen, Jon Finkel, and Nicolai Herzog, some of the most accomplished players in the game. Finkel had his tenth Top 8 showing, a feat matched even today only by Kai Budde and Paulo Vitor Damo da Rosa. In the Masters final Franck Canu defeated Ken Ho.

=== Tournament data ===
Players: 349
Prize Pool: $200,130
Format: Rochester Draft (Onslaught)
Head Judge: Mike Guptil

=== Top 8 ===
Quarter-finals
1	Eugene Harvey	2
8	Dustin Stern	3
4	Bram Snepvangers	2
5	Nicolai Herzog	3
2	Kai Budde	3
7	William Jensen	1
3	Fabio Reinhardt	2
7	Jon Finkel	3

Semi-finals
Dustin Stern	1
Nicolai Herzog	3
Kai Budde	3
Jon Finkel	1

Finals
Nicolai Herzog	0
Kai Budde	3

=== Final standings ===
Place	Player	Prize	Pro Points	Comment
1	(Germany) Kai Budde	$30,000	32	8th Final day, 7th Pro Tour win
2	(Norway) Nicolai Herzog	$20,000	24	2nd Final day
3	(United States) Jon Finkel	$15,000	16	10th Final day
4	(United States) Dustin Stern	$13,000	16	
5	(United States) Eugene Harvey	$9,000	12	
6	(Germany) Fabio Reinhardt	$8,500	12	
7	(Netherlands) Bram Snepvangers	$8,000	12	2nd Final day
8	(United States) William Jensen	$7,500	12	2nd Final day

=== Masters – Standard ===
1st Round
1	Dave Humpherys	2
32	Ferad Meraghni	0
17	Pierre Malherbaud	2
16	Jelger Wiegersma	1
8	Dirk Baberowksi	1
25	Noah Boeken	2
24	Franck Canu	2
9	Alex Shvartsman	1
5	Jens Thorén	0
28	Jin Okamoto	2
21	Kamiel Cornelissen	2
12	Bram Snepvangers	1
13	Bob Maher, Jr.	1
20	Antoine Ruel	2
29	Amiel Tenenbaum	1
4	Olivier Ruel	2
3	Rob Dougherty	0
30	Neil Reeves	2
19	John Larkin	1
14	Jeff Cunningham	2
11	Gary Wise	2
22	Brian Davis	1
27	Marco Blume	2
6	Justin Gary	0
7	Eivind Nitter	2
26	Ben Stark	0
23	Jeroen Remie	1
10	Ken Ho	2
15	Carlos Romão	2
18	Frank Karsten	1
31	Eric Froehlich	1
2	Kai Budde	2

2nd Round
Dave Humpherys	2
Pierre Malherbaud	0
Noah Boeken	0
Franck Canu	2
Jin Okamoto	0
Kamiel Cornelissen	2
Antoine Ruel	2
Olivier Ruel	0
Neil Reeves	2
Jeff Cunningham	1
Gary Wise	2
Marco Blume	0
Eivind Nitter	1
Ken Ho	2
Carlos Romão	1
Kai Budde	2

Quarter-finals
Dave Humpherys	0
Franck Canu	2
Kamiel Cornelissen	0
Antoine Ruel	2
Neil Reeves	2
Gary Wise	0
Ken Ho	2
Kai Budde	1

Semi-finals
Franck Canu	2
Antoine Ruel	0
Neil Reeves	0
Ken Ho	2

Finals
Franck Canu	2
Ken Ho	0

=== Pro Player of the year standings ===
Rank	Player	Pro Points
1	(Germany) Kai Budde	64
2	(Germany) Dirk Baberowski	42
3	(United States) Bob Maher, Jr.	40
4	(United States) Justin Gary	38
5	(Norway) Nicolai Herzog	34

== Grand Prixs – Hiroshima, Sevilla, Boston ==
GP Hiroshima (25–26 January)

1. (Japan) Motokiyo Azuma
2. (Japan) Osamu Fujita
3. (Japan) Takao Higaki
4. (Japan) Kang Jisang
5. (Japan) Junichi Kinoshita
6. (Japan) Yoshitaka Nakano
7. (Japan) Tsuyoshi Fujita
8. (Japan) Atsushi Tabuchi

GP Sevilla (22–23 February)

1. (Sweden) Anton Jonsson
2. (Brazil) Carlos Romão
3. (Norway) Eivind Nitter
4. (France) Antoine Ruel
5. (Netherlands) Stan van der Velden
6. (Spain) Adriano Rohner
7. (Germany) David Brucker
8. (Spain) Javier Perez Fresnedo

GP Boston (22–23 February)

1. (United States) Brian Kibler
2. Matthew Cory
3. (United States) Aaron Breider
4. (Canada) Mark Zajdner
5. (United States) Ben Rubin
6. Joshua Wagener
7. (United States) Zvi Mowshowitz
8. Eric James

== Pro Tour – Venice (21–23 March 2003) ==
Osyp Lebedowicz won Pro Tour Venice with a white and red deck revolving around the Cycling mechanic. It was the second-most popular deck at the tournament trailing only the deck played by his opponent Tomi Walamies in the final. Walamies played a red deck with a Goblin theme. The Masters was won by the Japanese team "PS2".

=== Tournament data ===
Players: 310
Prize Pool: $200,130
Format: Onslaught Block Constructed (Onslaught, Legions)
Head Judge: Collin Jackson

=== Top 8 ===
Quarter-finals
1	Gabriel Nassif	1
8	William Jensen	3
4	Osyp Lebedowicz	3
5	Akihiro Kashima	0
2	Tomi Walamies	3
7	Mattias Jorstedt	1
3	Darwin Kastle	1
6	Jordan Berkowitz	3

Semi-finals
William Jensen	2
Osyp Lebedowicz	3
Tomi Walamies	3
Jordan Berkowitz	0

Finals
Osyp Lebedowicz	3
Tomi Walamies	0

=== Final standings ===
Place	Player	Prize	Pro Points	Comment
1	(United States) Osyp Lebedowicz	$30,000	32	2nd Final day
2	(Finland) Tomi Walamies	$20,000	24	2nd Final day
3	(United States) Jordan Berkowitz	$15,000	16	
4	(United States) William Jensen	$13,000	16	3rd Final day
5	(France) Gabriel Nassif	$9,000	12	2nd Final day
6	(United States) Darwin Kastle	$8,500	12	8th Final day
7	(Japan) Akihiro Kashima	$8,000	12	
8	(Sweden) Mattias Jorstedt	$7,500	12	2nd Final day

=== Winner's decklist ===
Osyp Lebedowicz won the tournament with the following red and white deck revolving around the Cycling mechanism:

Astral Slide by Osyp Lebedowicz – Pro Tour Venice 2003
Main Deck:		Sideboard:
4 Akroma's Blessing; 4 Akroma's Vengeance; 4 Astral Slide; 2 Daru Sanctifier; 2 Gempalm Incinerator; 2 Jareth, Leonin Titan; 4 Lightning Rift; 3 Renewed Faith; 4 Starstorm	4 Forgotten Cave; 9 Mountain; 10 Plains; 4 Secluded Steppe	2 Akroma, Angel of Wrath; 4 Avarax; 3 Demystify; 3 Disciple of Grace; 2 Gempalm Incinerator; 1 Oblation

=== Masters – Team Rochester Draft ===
Quarter-finals
1	Jokas
8	PS2	2
4	Panzer Hunters	2
5	Phoenix Foundation
2	Outland
7	2020	2
3	Courtney's Boys	2
6	Illuminati

Semi-finals
PS2	2
Panzer Hunters
2020	2
Courtney's Boys

Finals
PS2	2
2020	1

Team	Player	Team	Player
2020	(Canada) David Rood	Outland	(Norway) Nicolai Herzog
2020	(Canada) Steve Wolfman	Outland	(Norway) Eivind Nitter
2020	(Canada) Elijah Pollock	Outland	(Norway) Bjørn Jocumsen
Courtney's Boys	(Canada) Gary Wise	Panzer Hunters	(Japan) Reiji Andou
Courtney's Boys	(United States) Neil Reeves	Panzer Hunters	(Japan) Kazuyuki Momose
Courtney's Boys	(United States) Bob Maher, Jr.	Panzer Hunters	(Japan) Itaru Ishida
Illuminati	(United States) Alex Shvartsman	Phoenix Foundation	(Germany) Kai Budde
Illuminati	(United States) Zvi Mowshowitz	Phoenix Foundation	(Germany) Dirk Baberowski
Illuminati	(United States) Patrick Sullivan	Phoenix Foundation	(Germany) Marco Blume
Jokas	(United States) Eric James	PS2	(Japan) Masahiro Kuroda
Jokas	(United States) Kyle Rose	PS2	(Japan) Katsuhiro Mori
Jokas	(United States) Norman Woods	PS2	(Japan) Masahiko Morita

=== Pro Player of the year standings ===
Rank	Player	Pro Points
1	(Germany) Kai Budde	69
2	(Germany) Dirk Baberowski	48
3	(United States) Osyp Lebedowicz	47
4	(United States) Justin Gary	46
5	(United States) Bob Maher, Jr.	42

== Grand Prixs – Kyoto, Singapore, Prague ==
GP Kyoto (29–30 March)

1. (Japan) Akira Asahara
2. (Japan) Hisaya Tanaka
3. (Japan) Masashi Oiso
4. (Japan) Akihiro Takakuwa
5. (Japan) Itaru Ishida
6. (Japan) Shuhei Nakamura
7. (Japan) Ryouma Shiozu
8. (Japan) Yoshiaki Tashiro

GP Singapore (29–30 March)

1. (Sweden) Mikael Polgary
2. (Malaysia) Terry Soh
3. (Singapore) Kelvin Yew Teck Hoon
4. (Singapore) Sam Lei Kang Lau
5. (Singapore) Chang Chua
6. (Hong Kong) Kai Cheong Tang
7. (United States) Gary Talim
8. (United States) Antonino De Rosa

GP Prague (12–13 April)

1. (Austria) Stefan Jedlicka
2. (France) Raphaël Lévy
3. (Norway) Thomas Gundersen
4. (Denmark) David Jensen
5. (Netherlands) Jelger Wiegersma
6. (France) Gabriel Nassif
7. (Sweden) Anton Jonsson
8. (Austria) Armin Birner

== Pro Tour – Yokohama (9–11 May 2003) ==
Making the final eight for the third time this season Mattias Jorstedt won Pro Tour Yokohama. Jon Finkel also made another Top 8 appearance thus extending his lead in this category to eleven. In the final of the last Masters tournament Bob Maher, Jr. defeated Gabriel Nassif.

=== Tournament data ===
Players: 243
Prize Pool: $200,130
Format: Booster Draft (Onslaught-Legions)
Head Judge: Rune Horvik

=== Top 8 ===
Quarter-finals
1	Mattias Jorstedt	3
8	Richard Hoaen	1
4	Jon Finkel	3
5	Benjamin Caumes	1
2	Tsuyoshi Ikeda	3
7	Ben Seck	2
3	Masashi Oiso	3
6	Jose Barbero	1

Semi-finals
Mattias Jorstedt	3
Jon Finkel	0
Tsuyoshi Ikeda	0
Masashi Oiso	3

Finals
Mattias Jorstedt	3
Masashi Oiso	0

=== Final standings ===
Place	Player	Prize	Pro Points	Comment
1	(Sweden) Mattias Jorstedt	$30,000	32	3rd Final day
2	(Japan) Masashi Oiso	$20,000	24	
3	(Japan) Tsuyoshi Ikeda	$15,000	16	
4	(United States) Jon Finkel	$13,000	16	11th Final day
5	(France) Benjamin Caumes	$9,000	12	
6	(Argentina) Jose Barbero	$8,500	12	
7	(Australia) Ben Seck	$8,000	12	
8	(Canada) Richard Hoaen	$7,500	12	

=== Masters – Extended ===
1st Round
1	Alexander Witt
32	Zvi Mowshowitz	2
17	Jeroen Remie	2
16	Mark Ziegner
12	John Larkin
21	Gabriel Nassif	2
28	Antoine Ruel
5	Dirk Baberowski	2
6	Osyp Lebedowicz
27	Eugene Harvey	2
22	Tomi Walamies	2
11	Anton Jonsson
15	Diego Ostrovich	2
18	Mathias Veron
31	Marco Blume	2
2	Kai Budde
3	Eivind Nitter	2
30	Brian Kibler
19	Jeff Cunningham
14	Rob Dougherty	2
10	Carlos Romão
23	Darwin Kastle	2
26	Kamiel Cornelissen	2
7	Bram Snepvangers
8	Nicolai Herzog	2
25	Mattias Jorstedt
24	Pierre Malherbaud	2
9	William Jensen
13	Bob Maher, Jr.	2
20	Jelger Wiegersma
29	Gary Wise
4	Justin Gary	2

2nd Round
Zvi Mowshowitz	2
Jeroen Remie
Gabriel Nassif	2
Dirk Baberowski
Eugene Harvey
Tomi Walamies	2
Diego Ostrovich	2
Marco Blume
Brian Kibler	2
Rob Dougherty
Darwin Kastle	2
Kamiel Cornelissen
Nicolai Herzog
Pierre Malherbaud	2
Bob Maher, Jr.	2
Justin Gary

Quarter-final
Zvi Mowshowitz	0
Gabriel Nassif	2
Tomi Walamies	2
Diego Ostrovich	0
Brian Kibler	0
Darwin Kastle	2
Pierre Malherbaud	0
Bob Maher, Jr.	2

Semi-finals
Gabriel Nassif	2
Tomi Walamies	1
Darwin Kastle	0
Bob Maher, Jr.	2

Finals
Gabriel Nassif	0
Bob Maher, Jr.	2

=== Pro Player of the year standings ===
Rank	Player	Pro Points
1	(Germany) Kai Budde	72
2	(Sweden) Mattias Jorstedt	60
3	(Germany) Dirk Baberowski	52
4	(United States) Osyp Lebedowicz	51
5	(United States) Justin Gary	49

== Grand Prixs – Pittsburgh, Amsterdam, Bangkok, Detroit ==
GP Pittsburgh (31 May – 1 June)
1. Illuminati

(United States) Justin Gary
(United States) Zvi Mowshowitz
(United States) Alex Shvartsman

2. Prodigy

(United States) James Duguid
(United States) Charles Gindy
(United States) Manny Orellana

3. Phoque Foundation

(France) Jean Charles Salvin
(Canada) Pasquale Ruggiero
(Canada) Jairo Liquidano

4. Northern Lights No. 5

(United States) Justin Schneider
(United States) Michael Krzywicki
(United States) Mike Long

GP Amsterdam (7–8 June)
1. Rankko Bongo Wheshiwheshi

(France) Wilfried Ranque
(Brazil) Carlos Romão
(Argentina) Jose Barbero

2. Ace Ten Off

(Netherlands) Kamiel Cornelissen
(United States) Jon Finkel
(United States) Eric Froehlich

3. Object of Affection

(Finland) Tomi Walamies
(Sweden) Jens Thorén
(Sweden) Anton Jonsson

4. Boston Tea Party

(Germany) André Delere
(Germany) Rolf Ottovordemgentschenfelde
(Germany) René Kraft

GP Bangkok (12–13 July)

1. (Japan) Tsuyoshi Fujita
2. (Japan) Itaru Ishida
3. (Malaysia) Vincent Gan
4. (Japan) Osamu Fujita
5. (Japan) Masahiko Morita
6. (Japan) Tsutomu Yamada
7. (Thailand) Peerapat Ekpoorthorn
8. (Thailand) Noppadol Srirattana

GP Detroit (12–13 July)

1. (United States) Bob Maher, Jr.
2. (United States) Eugene Harvey
3. (United States) Joshua Ravitz
4. (United States) Alex Shvartsman
5. (United States) Mark Herberholz
6. (United States) Matt Severa
7. (United States) Morgan Douglass
8. (United States) Derek Starleaf

== 2003 World Championships – Berlin (6–10 August 2003) ==
German Daniel Zink won the 2003 World Championship, defeating Jin Okamoto from Japan in the finals. Both players played manaheavy control decks built around Mirari's Wake. Kai Budde was declared Pro Player of the year for the third time in a row as none of his pursuers made significant points at this tournament. The United States won the national team competition, defeating Finland in the finals.

=== Tournament data ===
Prize pool: $208,130 (individual) + $213,000 (national teams)
Players: 309
Formats: Standard, Rochester Draft (Onslaught-Legions-Scourge), Extended
Head Judge: Rune Horvik

=== Top 8 ===
Quarter-finals
1	Tuomo Nieminen	3
8	Gabe Walls	2
4	Jin Okamoto	3
5	Peer Kröger	0
2	Dave Humpherys	3
7	Wolfgang Eder	2
3	Jeroen Remie	1
6	Daniel Zink	3

Semi-finals
Tuomo Nieminen	1
Jin Okamoto	3
Dave Humpherys	0
Daniel Zink	3

Finals
Jin Okamoto	0
Daniel Zink	3

=== Final standings ===
Place	Player	Prize	Pro Points	Comment
1	(Germany) Daniel Zink	$35,000	32	
2	(Japan) Jin Okamoto	$23,000	24	
3	(Finland) Tuomo Nieminen	$15,000	16	
4	(United States) Dave Humpherys	$13,000	16	5th Final day
5	(Netherlands) Jeroen Remie	$9,500	12	2nd Final day
6	(Germany) Peer Kröger	$8,500	12	3rd Final day
7	(Germany) Wolfgang Eder	$7,500	12	
8	(United States) Gabe Walls	$6,500	12	

=== National team competition ===
1. United States (Justin Gary, Gabe Walls, Joshua Wagner)
2. Finland (Tomi Walamies, Tuomo Nieminen, Arho Toikka)

== Pro Player of the year final standings ==
After the World Championship Kai Budde was awarded his fourth Pro Player of the year title.

Rank	Player	Pro Points
1	(Germany) Kai Budde	80
2	(United States) Justin Gary	64
2	(Sweden) Mattias Jorstedt	64
4	(Germany) Dirk Baberowski	58
5	(United States) Bob Maher, Jr.	56
