= Richard Hoaen =

Canadian Magic: The Gathering player

- Nationality: (Canada) Canadian
- Pro Tour debut: Pro Tour Los Angeles 2001
- Winnings: $91,830
- Pro Tour wins (Top 8): 0 (1)
- Grand Prix wins (Top 8): 4 (9)
- Lifetime Pro Points: 254

Richard Hoaen is a Canadian Magic: The Gathering player. Known for his skill in limited formats, Hoaen has reached the top eight of a Pro Tour just once. In addition, Hoaen has made the top eight of seven Grand Prix, winning three, and was runner-up to Tiago Chan in the last Magic Invitational.

== Career ==
Richard Hoaen first appeared on the Pro Tour in 2001, with a 301st-place finish at Pro Tour Los Angeles.

Hoaen began the following season with his first standout performance. Alongside Mark Zajdner and Stephen Cassell, he finished 15th at Pro Tour Boston. Although qualified, he elected to skip both constructed Pro Tours that season. After a 22nd-place finish at Pro Tour Chicago, Hoaen reached the high point of his career when he made the top eight of Pro Tour Yokohama, losing in the quarterfinals to number one seed and eventual champion Mattias Jorstedt. About a month later, Hoaen won a spot on the Canadian national team, finishing 3rd at Canadian nationals. Hoaen rounded out the season with unimpressive finishes at worlds, both individually and with the national team.

Over the two years that followed, Hoaen established himself as one of the most dominant limited players on the Pro Tour. His results at limited Pro Tours in the 2003–04 and 2005 seasons were 10th at Pro Tour Amsterdam, finishing just one match point short of the top eight; 12th at Pro Tour San Diego, 11th at Pro Tour Nagoya, missing the top eight on tie-breakers on both occasions; and 20th at Pro Tour London missing the elimination rounds by a win and a draw. In addition, he finished second to Jordan Berkowitz at Grand Prix Detroit in 2005.

In 2006, although Hoaen's results on the Pro Tour were not as good as previous years, he made up for it with high level finishes at Grand Prix. He won Grand Prix Richmond, and reached the elimination rounds in Madison, New Jersey, and Yamagata. After losing the finals of the 2007 Magic Invitational to Thiago Chan, Hoaen's presence on the Pro Tour declined.

Most recently, he won Grand Prix Montreal in 2011, as well as Grand Prix Kyoto in 2013 alongside teammates Alexander Hayne and Mike Hron. At Pro Tour Magic Origins in 2015, he narrowly missed the top eight on tiebreakers, finishing 9th.

=== Achievements ===
Season	Event type	Location	Format	Date	Rank
2001–02	Nationals	Toronto	Standard and Booster Draft	13–15 June 2002	7
2002–03	Pro Tour	Yokohama	Rochester Draft	9–10 May 2003	8
2002–03	Nationals	Montreal	Standard and Booster Draft	20–22 June 2003	3
2005	Grand Prix	Detroit	Sealed and Booster Draft	23–24 April 2005	2
2006	Grand Prix	Richmond, Virginia	Sealed and Booster Draft	4–5 February 2006	1
2006	Grand Prix	Madison, Wisconsin	Team Constructed	25–26 March 2006	3
2006	Grand Prix	New Jersey	Sealed and Booster Draft	11–12 November 2006	2
2006	Grand Prix	Yamagata	Sealed and Booster Draft	18–19 November 2006	5
2007	Invitational	Essen	Special	18–21 October 2007	2
2011	Grand Prix	Montreal	Sealed and Booster Draft	17–18 September 2011	1
2013–14	Grand Prix	Kyoto	Team Limited	23–24 November 2013	1
2015–16	Grand Prix	Beijing	Team Limited	24–25 October 2015	1
2015–16	Grand Prix	Washington, D.C.	Team Limited	12–13 March 2016	2

Last updated: 14 March 2016
Source: Wizards.com
