= Antonino De Rosa =

Italian-American Magic: The Gathering player

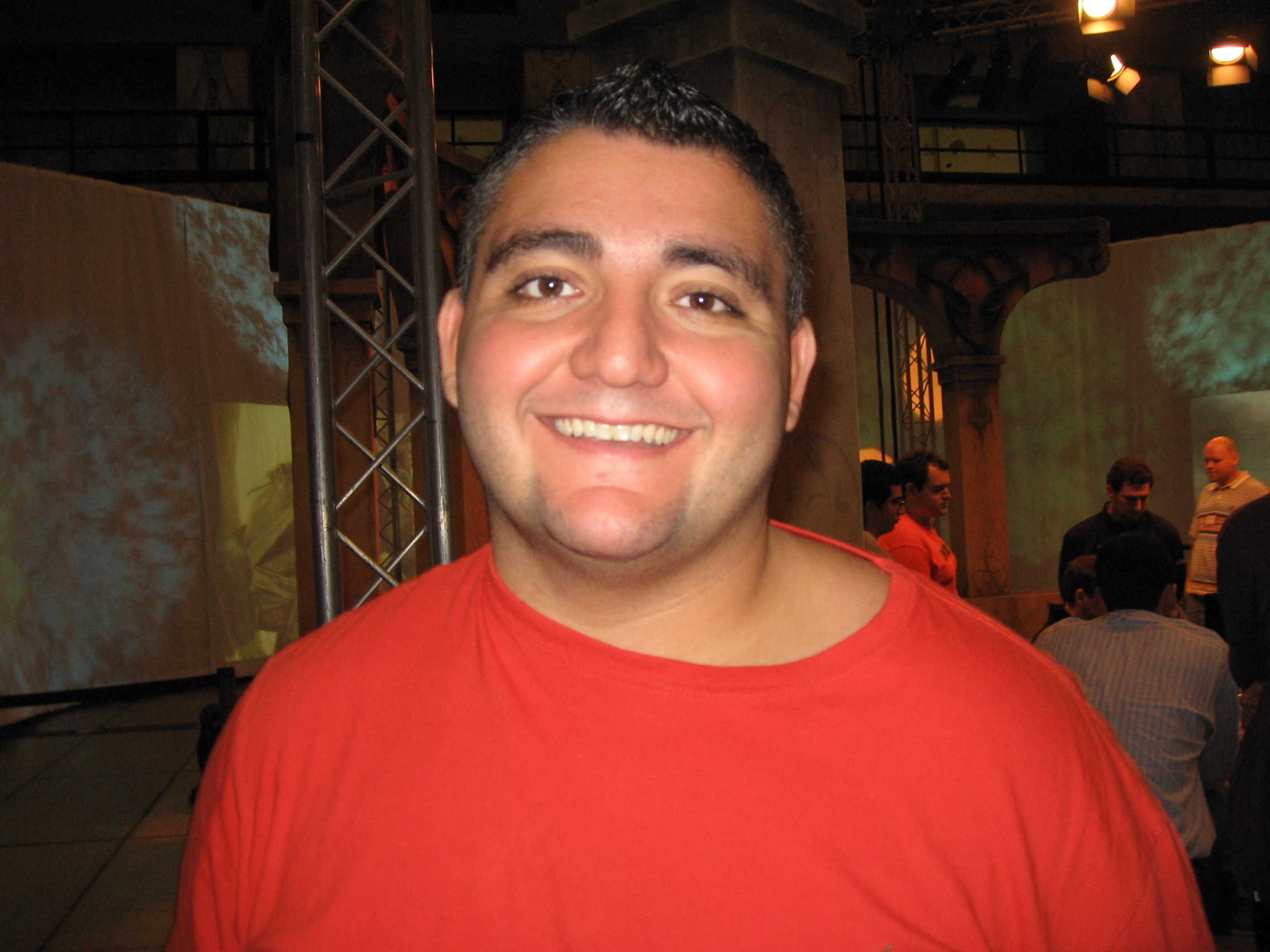
- Born: 24 September 1981 (age 45)
- Nationality: (United States) American/ (Italy) Italian
- Pro Tour debut: 1999 Pro Tour London
- Winnings: US$92,735
- Pro Tour wins (Top 8): 0 (1)
- Grand Prix wins (Top 8): 4 (11)
- Median Pro Tour Finish: 101
- Lifetime Pro Points: 277
- Planeswalker Level: 49 (Archmage)

Antonino De Rosa is an Italian-American Magic: The Gathering player. His successes include four Grand Prix wins, a US Nationals title in 2005, and a top eight at Pro Tour Prague 2006.

== Achievements ==
| Season | Event type | Location | Format | Date | Rank |
|---|---|---|---|---|---|
| 2001–02 | Grand Prix | Atlanta | Sealed and Booster Draft | 17–18 November 2001 | 6 |
| 2001–02 | Grand Prix | Tampa | Sealed and Booster Draft | 23–24 February 2002 | 5 |
| 2002–03 | Grand Prix | Singapore | Sealed and Booster Draft | 29–30 March 2003 | 8 |
| 2003–04 | Grand Prix | London | Block Constructed | 22–24 August 2003 | 5 |
| 2003–04 | Grand Prix | Kansas City | Rochester Draft | 18–19 October 2003 | 1 |
| 2003–04 | Grand Prix | Orlando | Block Constructed | 24–25 July 2004 | 6 |
| 2005 | Nationals | | Standard and Booster Draft | 12–14 August 2005 | 1 |
| 2005 | Grand Prix | Salt Lake City | Block Constructed | 27–28 August 2005 | 1 |
| 2005 | Worlds | Yokohama | National team | 30 November–4 December 2005 | 2 |
| 2006 | Grand Prix | Charlotte | Extended | 18–19 December 2005 | 6 |
| 2006 | Pro Tour | Prague | Booster Draft | 5–7 May 2006 | 6 |
| 2006 | Invitational | Los Angeles | Special | 10–12 May 2006 | 5 |
| 2006 | Grand Prix | Toronto | Sealed and Booster Draft | 3–4 June 2006 | 1 |
| 2006 | Nationals | Atlanta | Standard and Booster Draft | 28–30 July 2006 | 6 |
| 2007 | Nationals | Baltimore | Special | 26–29 July 2007 | 8 |
| 2008 | Grand Prix | Denver | Block Constructed | 9–10 August 2008 | 7 |
| 2012 | Grand Prix | Turin | Modern | 31 March-1 April 2012 | 1 |

Last updated: 1 April 2012
Source: Wizards.com Wizards.com
Other accomplishments

- Two appearances at Italian nationals.

| Preceded by Craig Krempels | Magic US National Champion; 2005 | Succeeded by Paul Cheon |
