= Matej Zatlkaj =

Slovak Magic: The Gathering player

- Nickname: Big Z
- Nationality: Slovak
- Pro Tour debut: Worlds 2003
- Winnings: US$63,100
- Pro Tour wins (Top 8): 0 (2)
- Grand Prix wins (Top 8): 1 (2)
- Lifetime Pro Points: 200

Matej Zatlkaj is a Slovak Magic: The Gathering player and commentator. He is perhaps best known for his second-place finish at Pro Tour Berlin in 2008, and his frequent appearances as part of the video coverage team for European Grand Prix.

== Achievements ==
Season	Event type	Location	Format	Date	Rank
2002–03	Nationals	Slovakia	Standard and Booster Draft	2003	1
2007	Grand Prix	Krakow	Standard	3–4 November 2007	8
2008	Pro Tour	Berlin	Extended	31 October–2 November 2008	2
2012–13	Pro Tour	Seattle	Block Constructed and Booster Draft	17–19 May 2013	7
2014–15	Grand Prix	Stockholm	Standard	25–26 October 2014	1
2014–15	World Magic Cup	Nice	National team	5–7 December 2014	7

Last updated: 12 April 2015
Source: Event Coverage at Wizards.com

Preceded by Tomas Tomecek	Magic Slovak National Champion; 2003	Succeeded by Rasto Stranak
