= Mark Herberholz =

American Magic: The Gathering player

- Nickname: Heezy
- Nationality: (United States) American
- Pro Tour debut: 2002 Pro Tour Osaka
- Winnings: US$113,980
- Pro Tour wins (Top 8): 1 (4)
- Grand Prix wins (Top 8): 0 (4)
- Lifetime Pro Points: 201

Mark Herberholz is an American Magic: The Gathering player. He is best known for winning Pro Tour Honolulu in 2006, and for designing the Heezy-street deck he used to win the tournament. More recently, Herberholz has attracted attention for his deck designs in collaboration with Gabriel Nassif and Patrick Chapin. He appeared on The Price Is Right on December 9, 2005 and won $5,850 in cash and prizes.

== Achievements ==
Season	Event type	Location	Format	Date	Rank
2002–03	Grand Prix	Detroit	Block Constructed	12–13 July 2003	5
2003–04	Pro Tour	San Diego	Block Constructed	14–16 May 2004	5
2005	Pro Tour	Philadelphia	Extended	6–8 May 2005	7
2005	Grand Prix	Minneapolis	Block Constructed	16–17 July 2005	2
2006	Pro Tour	Honolulu	Standard	3–5 March 2006	1
2007	Grand Prix	Dallas	Extended	24–25 February 2007	5
2007	Pro Tour	Yokohama	Block Constructed	20–22 April 2007	3
2009	Grand Prix	Los Angeles	Extended	17–18 January 2009	7

Last updated: 21 February 2010
Source: Wizards.com
