= Justin Gary =

American Magic: The Gathering player

- Nationality: (United States) American
- Winnings: US$120,815
- Pro Tour wins (Top 8): 1 (3)
- Grand Prix wins (Top 8): 1 (3)
- Median Pro Tour Finish: 73
- Lifetime Pro Points: 252
- Planeswalker Level: 45 (Battlemage)

Justin Gary is an American Magic: The Gathering player. At age 17, Gary was U.S. junior champion in 1997. His most notable Pro Tour finish is his win at Pro Tour Houston 2002. Rob Dougherty and Darwin Kastle who both tested with Gary finished second and third respectively at the same event. In 2010, Gary founded Gary Games. In August 2010 the first product, Ascension: Chronicle of the Godslayer, was introduced at Gen Con. The deck-building game, designed by Gary along with Brian Kibler, John Fiorillo, and Rob Dougherty, received a larger introduction in 2012 through a Kickstarter campaign. That same year the company changed its name to Stone Blade Entertainment, and in 2013 they followed up their release of Ascension with the development and limited production of SolForge, a digital-only collectible card game.

== Achievements ==
Season	Event type	Location	Format	Date	Rank
1998–99	Pro Tour	Rome	Extended	13–15 November 1998	6
2001–02	Pro Tour	New York	Team Limited	7–9 September 2001	3
2002–03	Pro Tour	Houston	Extended	8–10 November 2002	1
2002–03	Grand Prix	Pittsburgh	Team Limited	31 May–1 June 2003	1

Source: "Pro Tour Top 8 by Event"
