= Jonathan Sonne =

American Magic: The Gathering player

- Nationality: (United States) American
- Pro Tour debut: 2000 Pro Tour Chicago
- Winnings: US$77,462
- Pro Tour wins (Top 8): 0 (1)
- Grand Prix wins (Top 8): 2 (7)
- Lifetime Pro Points: 207
- Highest Constructed Rating: 2117
- Highest Limited Rating: 2204
- Planeswalker Level: 48 (Archmage)

Jonathan Sonne is an American Magic: The Gathering player. He has reached the top eight of a Pro Tour once, and has won two Grand Prix. He was also part of the US national team that placed second at the World Championship in 2005.

== Achievements ==
Season	Event type	Location	Format	Date	Rank
2002-03	Pro Tour	Boston	Team Limited	27–29 September 2002	4
2005	Grand Prix	Austin	Rochester Draft	9–10 October 2004	1
2005	Nationals		Standard and Booster Draft	12–14 August 2005	3
2005	Grand Prix	Philadelphia	Legacy	12–13 November 2005	1
2005	Worlds	Yokohama	National team	30 November-4 December 2005	2
2006	Grand Prix	Richmond, Virginia	Sealed and Booster Draft	4–5 February 2006	2
2006	Grand Prix	Madison, Wisconsin	Team Constructed	25–26 March 2006	4
2006	Grand Prix	Toronto	Sealed and Booster Draft	3–4 June 2006	2
2008	Grand Prix	Philadelphia	Extended	15–16 March 2008	8
2008	Grand Prix	Kansas City	Sealed and Booster Draft	18–19 October 2008	3

Last updated: 25 August 2009
Source: Wizards.com
