= André Coimbra =

Portuguese Magic: The Gathering player

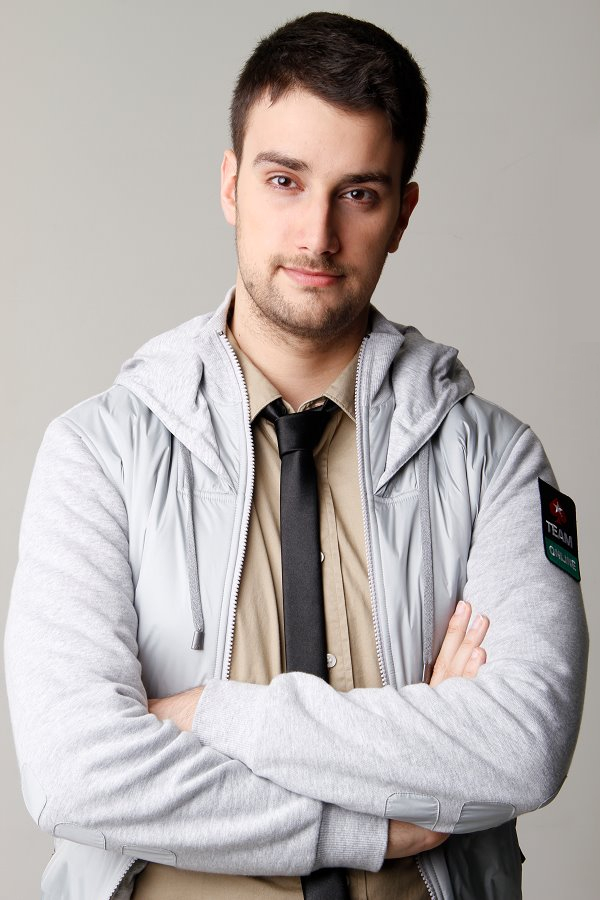
- Nickname: acoimbra
- Born: April 27, 1986 (age 39); Coimbra, Portugal
- Pro Tour debut: 2005 World Championships – Yokohama
- Winnings: US$82,170
- Pro Tour wins (Top 8): 1 (2)
- Grand Prix wins (Top 8): 0 (5)
- Median Pro Tour Finish: 94
- Lifetime Pro Points: 137
- Planeswalker Level: 43 (Battlemage)

André Coimbra is a Portuguese former professional Magic: The Gathering player and former professional poker player, member of PokerStars Team Online, he retired in 2017 after choosing not to renew his contract. He is from Coimbra, Portugal, and is perhaps best known in the Magic: The Gathering community for winning the Magic: The Gathering 2009 World Championship.

== Career ==
=== Magic: The Gathering Accomplishments ===
Season	Event type	Location	Format	Date	Rank
2005	Worlds	Yokohama	Special	30 November-4 December 2005	8
2006	Grand Prix	Malmo	Sealed and Booster Draft	22–23 July 2006	7
2006	Grand Prix	Hiroshima	Sealed and Booster Draft	19–20 August 2006	2
2006	Grand Prix	Phoenix, Arizona	Sealed and Booster Draft	2–3 September 2006	7
2007	Grand Prix	Florence	Block Constructed	8–9 September 2007	2
2007	Grand Prix	Brisbane	Sealed and Booster Draft	20–21 October 2007	3
2009	Worlds	Rome	Special	19–22 November 2009	1

Last updated: 5 September 2011
Source: Wizards.com Event Coverage at Wizards.com

=== Decks ===
Much of the talk after the 2009 World Championship centred on André Coimbra's deck. The deck was designed by professional Magic: The Gathering writer Mike Flores, who called the deck 'Naya Lightsaber'. The deck was designed to beat Jund, the dominant deck at the time, and did just that when Coimbra won the World Championships finals 3–0 against David Reitbauer's Jund deck.

André Coimbra - 2009 World Championship Naya Lightsaber
Main Deck:		Sideboard:
4 Baneslayer Angel; 4 Bloodbraid Elf; 4 Noble Hierarch; 4 Ranger of Eos; 1 Scute Mob; 4 Wild Nacatl; 4 Woolly Thoctar 3 Ajani Vengeant; 4 Lightning Bolt; 4 Path to Exile	4 Arid Mesa; 4 Forest; 3 Mountain; 1 Oran-Rief, the Vastwood; 4 Plains; 4 Rootbound Crag; 4 Sunpetal Grove	1 Ajani Vengeant; 2 Burst Lightning; 4 Celestial Purge; 4 Goblin Ruinblaster; 4 Great Sable Stag

Preceded by (Finland) Antti Malin	Magic World Champion; 2009	Succeeded by (France) Guillaume Matignon
