= Osyp Lebedowicz =

American Magic: The Gathering player

- Nationality: (United States) American
- Pro Tour debut: 2001 Pro Tour New Orleans
- Winnings: US$114,200
- Pro Tour wins (Top 8): 1 (3)
- Grand Prix wins (Top 8): 1 (5)
- Lifetime Pro Points: 239
- Planeswalker Level: 47 (Archmage)

Osyp Lebedowicz is an American Magic: The Gathering player. He won Pro Tour Venice 2003, and is also known for his involvement in developing the Aether Vial affinity archetype.

== Achievements ==
Season	Event type	Location	Format	Date	Rank
2001–02	Pro Tour	Osaka	Block Constructed	15–17 March 2002	7
2002–03	Pro Tour	Venice	Block Constructed	21–23 March 2003	1
2003–04	Grand Prix	Washington D.C.	Team Limited	17–18 April 2004	2
2003–04	Grand Prix	Orlando, Florida	Block Constructed	24–25 July 2004	1
2005	Grand Prix	Boston	Extended	5–6 February 2005	5
2005	Grand Prix	Detroit	Sealed and Booster Draft	24–25 April 2005	5
2006	Pro Tour	Honolulu	Standard	3–5 March 2006	5
2016–17	Grand Prix	Providence	Standard	22–23 October 2016	4

Last updated: 30 October 2016
Source: Wizards.com
