= Helmut Summersberger =

Austrian Magic: The Gathering player

- Nationality: Austrian
- Pro Tour debut: 2000 Worlds Brussels
- Pro Tour wins (Top 8): 0 (1)
- Grand Prix wins (Top 8): 2 (4)
- Lifetime Pro Points: 200
- Planeswalker Level: 48 (Archmage)

Helmut Summersberger is an Austrian Magic: The Gathering player. His best finishes include a sixth place at the 2000 World Championship in Brussels, and a second-place finish with the Austrian national team at the 2007 World Championship in New York City.

== Achievements ==
Season	Event type	Location	Format	Date	Rank
1999–2000	Worlds	Brussels	Special	2–6 August 2000	6
2001–02	Grand Prix	London	Block Constructed	1–2 September 2001	3
2006	Grand Prix	Lille	Limited	18–19 December 2005	1
2006	Grand Prix	Barcelona	Sealed and Booster Draft	8–9 April 2006	1
2007	Worlds	New York City	Two-Headed Giant	6–9 December 2007	2
2009	Grand Prix	Hanover	Extended	13–14 March 2009	7

Last updated: 11 January 2013
Source: Wizards.com
