= Eugene Harvey =

American Magic: The Gathering player

- Nationality: (United States) American
- Pro Tour debut: 2001 Worlds Toronto
- Winnings: US$135,835
- Pro Tour wins (Top 8): 0 (4)
- Grand Prix wins (Top 8): 1 (5)
- Lifetime Pro Points: 202
- Planeswalker Level: 45 (Battlemage)

Eugene Harvey is an American Magic: The Gathering player. His major successes include four Pro Tour top eights, and five Grand Prix top eights. Harvey was part of the US national team that won the World Championship in 2001, which was Harvey's first Pro Tour. He also won the 2002 US National Championship.

== Achievements ==
Season	Event type	Location	Format	Date	Rank
2000–01	Nationals	Orlando	Standard and Booster Draft	1–3 June 2001	3
2000–01	Worlds	Toronto	National team	8–12 August 2001	1
2001–02	Grand Prix	Atlanta	Standard and Booster Draft	17–18 November 2001	1
2001–02	Nationals	Kissimmee, Florida	Standard and Booster Draft	31 May–2 June 2002	1
2001–02	Worlds	Sydney	National team	14–18 August 2002	2
2002–03	Grand Prix	New Orleans	Extended	3–4 January 2003	2
2002–03	Pro Tour	Chicago	Rochester Draft	17–19 January 2003	5
2002–03	Grand Prix	Detroit	Block Constructed	12–13 July 2003	2
2003–04	Pro Tour	Boston	Team Limited	12–14 September 2003	3
2003–04	Pro Tour	New Orleans	Extended	31 October–2 November 2002	6
2003–04	Grand Prix	New Jersey	Block Constructed	14–15 August 2004	3
2006	Grand Prix	Richmond, Virginia	Sealed and Booster Draft	4–5 February 2006	5
2007	Pro Tour	San Diego	Two-Headed Giant	29 June–1 July 2007	3

Last updated: 25 August 2009
Source: Wizards.com

Preceded by (United States) United States; Jon Finkel; Chris Benafel; Frank Hernandez; Aaron Forsythe	Magic: The Gathering Team World Champion; With: Trevor Blackwell; Brian Hegstad; 2001	Succeeded by (Germany) Germany; Kai Budde; Felix Schneider; Mark Ziegner
Preceded by Trevor Blackwell	Magic US National Champion; 2002	Succeeded by Joshua Wagener
