= Magic: The Gathering Pro Tour season 2007 =

2007 Pro Tour season
- Pro Player of the Year: (Japan) Tomoharu Saitou
- Rookie of the Year: (Japan) Yuuya Watanabe
- World Champion: (Israel) Uri Peleg
- Pro Tours: 5
- Grands Prix: 16
- Hall of Fame inductions: Kai Budde; Zvi Mowshowitz; Tsuyoshi Fujita; Nicolai Herzog; Randy Buehler
- Start of season: 9 February 2007
- End of season: 9 December 2007

The 2007 Pro Tour season was the twelfth season of the Magic: The Gathering Pro Tour. On 9 February 2007 the season began with Pro Tour Geneva. It ended on 9 December 2007 with the conclusion of the 2007 World Championship in New York. The season consisted of 16 Grand Prixs and 5 Pro Tours, held in Geneva, Yokohama, San Diego, Valencia, and New York. At the end of the season Tomoharu Saitou from Japan was proclaimed Pro Player of the year. At the Worlds in New York the third class of the Hall of Fame was inducted. The inductees were Kai Budde, Zvi Mowshowitz, Tsuyoshi Fujita, Nicolai Herzog, and Randy Buehler.

== Pro Tour – Geneva (9–11 February 2007) ==
Mike Hron of the United States won the Pro Tour, defeating Takuya Oosawa in the Japanese player's second finals appearance. Willy Edel of Brazil became the first South American player with three top eight finishes, and former of player of the year Kenji Tsumura reached the quarter finals for the fifth time.

=== Tournament data ===
Prize pool: $240,245
Players: 387
Format: Booster Draft (Time Spiral-Planar Chaos)
Head Judge: David Vogin

=== Top 8 ===
Quarter-finals
1	Shingou Kurihara	3
8	Ervin Tormos	1
4	Jim Herold	0
5	Takuya Oosawa	3
2	Kenji Tsumura	3
7	Willy Edel	1
3	Mike Hron	3
6	Marijn Lybaert	1

Semi-finals
Shingou Kurihara	1
Takuya Oosawa	3
Kenji Tsumura	1
Mike Hron	3

Finals
Takuya Oosawa	2
Mike Hron	3

=== Final standings ===
Place	Player	Prize	Pro Points	Comment
1	(United States) Mike Hron	$40,000	25	
2	(Japan) Takuya Oosawa	$22,000	20	2nd Final day
3	(Japan) Kenji Tsumura	$15,000	16	5th Final day
4	(Japan) Shingou Kurihara	$14,000	16	
5	(Belgium) Marijn Lybaert	$11,500	12	
6	(Germany) Jim Herold	$11,000	12	
7	(Brazil) Willy Edel	$10,500	12	3rd Final day
8	(United States) Ervin Tormos	$10,000	12	2nd Final day

== Grand Prixs – Dallas, Singapore, Amsterdam, Kyoto, Massachusetts ==
GP Dallas (24–25 February)

- Format: Extended
- Attendance: 748
1. (France) Raphaël Lévy
2. (United States) Paul Cheon
3. (Japan) Kenji Tsumura
4. (United States) John Pelcak
5. (United States) Mark Herberholz
6. (United States) Paul Nguyen
7. (United States) Alex Ledbetter
8. (United States) Jim Davis

GP Singapore (3–4 March)

- Format: Extended
- Attendance: 331
1. (France) Raphaël Lévy
2. (Japan) Shingou Kurihara
3. (France) Antoine Ruel
4. (Japan) Osamu Fujita
5. (France) Olivier Ruel
6. (Japan) Koutarou Ootsuka
7. (Japan) Ryou Ogura
8. (Japan) Tomoharu Saitou

GP Amsterdam (10–11 March)

- Format: Two-headed Giant Limited
- Attendance: 1336 (668 teams)
1. (Slovakia) Richard Hornansky
  (Slovakia) Michael Havlik
2. (France) Amiel Tenenbaum
  (France) Gabriel Nassif
3. (Netherlands) Olaf Koster
  (Netherlands) Christian Kok
4. (Greece) Vassilis Fatouros
  (Greece) Georgios Kapalos

GP Kyoto (17–18 March)

- Format: Standard
- Attendance: 859
1. (Japan) Yuuya Watanabe
2. (Japan) Yuusuke Iwasaki
3. (Japan) Motokiyo Azuma
4. (Japan) Tsubasa Tomii
5. (Japan) Naoki Shimizu
6. (Japan) Ren Ishikawa
7. (Japan) Atsushi Wada
8. (Japan) Katsuhiro Ide

GP Massachusetts (31 March – 1 April)

- Format: Two-Headed Giant Limited
- Attendance: 690 (345 teams)
1. (United States) Matt Wang
  (United States) Steven O'Mahoney-Schwartz
2. (United States) Gerard Fabiano
  (United States) Eric Ziegler
3. (United States) Ben Lundquist
  (United States) Timothy Aten
4. (United States) Matt Rubin
  (United States) Rob DiPalma

== Pro Tour – Yokohama (20–22 April 2007) ==
Frenchman Guillaume Wafo-Tapa won the second Pro Tour of the year, emerging from a Top eight in which every other contestant has at least twice appeared in a PT final eight. Masashi Oiso became only the fifth player to reach the quarter finals more than five times, Portugal's Paulo Carvalho put up his second top eight in three events, and Raphaël Lévy continued his hot streak with his first Pro Tour top eight since 1999.

=== Tournament data ===
Prize pool: $240,245
Players: 387
Format: Time Spiral Block Constructed
Head Judge: Sheldon Menery

=== Top 8 ===
Quarter-finals
1	Kazuya Mitamura	3
8	Sebastian Thaler	0
4	Raphaël Lévy	1
5	Tomoharu Saitou	3
2	Mark Herberholz	3
7	Masashi Oiso	0
3	Paulo Caravlho	2
6	Guillaume Wafo-Tapa	3

Semi-finals
Kazuya Mitamura	3
Tomoharu Saitou	2
Mark Herberholz	2
Guillaume Wafo-Tapa	3

Finals
Kazuya Mitamura	1
Guillaume Wafo-Tapa	3

=== Final standings ===
Place	Player	Prize	Pro Points	Comment
1	(France) Guillaume Wafo-Tapa	$40,000	25	
2	(Japan) Kazuya Mitamura	$22,000	20	2nd Final day
3	(United States) Mark Herberholz	$15,000	16	4th Final day
4	(Japan) Tomoharu Saitou	$14,000	16	4th Final day
5	(Portugal) Paulo Carvalho	$11,500	12	2nd Final day
6	(France) Raphaël Lévy	$11,000	12	3rd Final day
7	(Japan) Masashi Oiso	$10,500	12	6th Final day
8	(Germany) Sebastian Thaler	$10,000	12	

== Grands Prix – Stockholm, Columbus, Strasbourg, Montreal ==
GP Stockholm (5–6 May)

- Format: Limited
- Attendance: 713
1. (Russia) Nicolay Potovin
2. (Germany) André Müller
3. (Japan) Kenji Tsumura
4. (Japan) Oliver Oks
5. (Netherlands) Bas Postema
6. (Norway) Thomas Refsdal
7. (Germany) Klaus Jöns
8. (Sweden) Samuel Korsell

GP Columbus (19–20 May)

- Format: Legacy
- Attendance: 883
1. (United States) Steve Sadin
2. (United States) Owen Turtenwald
3. (United States) Bill Stark
4. (United States) Max Tietze
5. (United States) Gadiel Szleifer
6. (United States) Paul Nicolo
7. (Canada) Ryan Trepanier
8. (United States) Michael Belfatto

GP Strasbourg (19–20 May)

- Format: Block Constructed
- Attendance: 1155
1. (Japan) Tomoharu Saitou
2. (Germany) Raul Porojan
3. (Japan) Shouta Yasooka
4. (Germany) Florian Pils
5. (Switzerland) Christoph Huber
6. (Germany) Klaus Jöns
7. (Czech Republic) Petr Martinek
8. (Austria) Stefan Heigerer

GP Montreal (23–24 June)

- Format: Block Constructed
- Attendance: 739
1. (Brazil) Celso Zampere Jr.
2. (United States) Paul Cheon
3. (France) Guillaume Wafo-Tapa
4. (Japan) Kenji Tsumura
5. (United States) Gabriel Schwarz
6. (Japan) Koutarou Ootsuka
7. (United States) Jason Imperiale
8. (Japan) Shouta Yasooka

== Pro Tour – San Diego (29 June – 1 July 2007) ==
Pro Tour San Diego was the inaugural and as yet only event for the Two-Headed Giant format at the Pro Tour level. Chris Lachmann and Jacob van Lunen won the tournament, both in their first Pro Tour, playing an innovative sliver strategy. They won the elimination bracket in a combined nine turns making it the shortest semi-final and final ever.

=== Tournament data ===
Prize pool: $240,500
Players: 390 (195 teams)
Format: Two-Headed Giant Booster Draft (Time Spiral-Planar Chaos-Future Sight)
Head Judge: Toby Elliott

=== Top 4 ===
Semifinals
1	Eugene Harvey; John Fiorillo	0
4	Yuuta Takahashi; Kentaro Yamamoto	1
3	Masami Kaneko; Genki Taru	0
2	Chris Lachman; Jacob van Lunen	1

Finals
Yuuta Takahashi; Kentaro Yamamoto	0
Chris Lachmann; Jacob van Lunen	1

=== Final standings ===
Place	Players	Prize	Pro Points	Comment
1	(United States) Chris Lachman	$50,000	20	Pro Tour debut
1	(United States) Jacob van Lunen	$50,000	20	Pro Tour debut
2	(Japan) Yuuta Takahashi	$30,000	16	
2	(Japan) Kentaro Yamamoto	$30,000	16	
3	(United States) John Fiorillo	$22,000	12	
3	(United States) Eugene Harvey	$22,000	12	4th Final day
4	(Japan) Masami Kaneko	$20,000	12	
4	(Japan) Genki Taru	$20,000	12	

== Grand Prixs – San Francisco, Florence ==
GP San Francisco (25–26 August)

- Format: Block Constructed
- Attendance: 672
1. (United States) Luis Scott-Vargas
2. (United States) Jonathan Stocks
3. (Brazil) Paulo Vitor Damo da Rosa
4. (United States) Brett Blackmann
5. (United States) David Irvine
6. (United States) Andrew Walden
7. (United States) Zack Smith
8. (United States) Paul Cheon

GP Florence (8–9 September)

- Format: Block Constructed
- Attendance: 1082
1. (Japan) Masami Kaneko
2. (Portugal) André Coimbra
3. (Italy) Marco Cammilluzzi
4. (Italy) Mido Kagawa
5. (Austria) Armin Birner
6. (Switzerland) Manuel Bucher
7. (Denmark) Rasmus Sibast
8. (Austria) Ronald Guetl

== Pro Tour – Valencia (12–14 October 2007) ==
Pro Tour Valencia began with a bumpy start. The first day of play to be canceled due to flooding. On the other two days the schedule had to be altered somewhat, including additional rounds on Saturday and three rounds on Sunday before Top 8. In the end, Frenchman Remi Fortier defeated Germany's André Müller in the final, making Valencia the third consecutive extended Pro Tour to be won by a French player.

=== Tournament data ===
Prize pool: $240,245
Players: 424
Format: Extended
Head Judge: Jaap Brouwer

=== Top 8 ===
Quarter-finals
1	Giulio Barra	3
8	Makihito Mihara	0
4	Tine Rus	2
5	Remi Fortier	3
2	Takayuki Koike	1
3	Shuhei Nakamura	3
3	André Müller	3
6	Sam Stein	1

Semi-finals
Giulio Barra	1
Remi Fortier	3
Shuhei Nakamura	2
André Müller	3

Finals
Remi Fortier	3
André Müller	2

=== Final standings ===
Place	Player	Prize	Pro Points	Comment
1	(France) Remi Fortier	$40,000	25	
2	(Germany) André Müller	$22,000	20	2nd Final day
3	(Italy) Giulio Barra	$15,000	16	
4	(Japan) Shuhei Nakamura	$14,000	16	4th Final day
5	(Japan) Takayuki Koike	$11,500	12	Pro Tour debut
6	(Slovenia) Tine Rus	$11,000	12	1st Slovenian in a Top 8, Pro Tour debut
7	(United States) Sam Stein	$10,500	12	
8	(Japan) Makihito Mihara	$10,000	12	2nd Final day

== Grand Prixs – Brisbane, Bangkok, Krakow, Kitakyuushuu, Daytona Beach ==
GP Brisbane (20–21 October)

- Format: Limited
- Attendance: 233
1. (Australia) Anatoli Lightfoot
2. (Australia) Shawn Rayson
3. (Portugal) André Coimbra
4. (New Zealand) Hassan Kamel
5. (Australia) David Zhao
6. (Australia) Norman McPherson
7. (Australia) Andrew Eckermann
8. (Australia) Chris Ninnes

GP Bangkok (27–28 October)

- Format: Limited
- Attendance: 314
1. (Japan) Masahiko Morita
2. (Japan) Shingou Kurihara
3. (Singapore) Yong Han Choo
4. (Singapore) Kok Seng Ong
5. (Japan) Junya Iyanaga
6. (Japan) Koutarou Ootsuka
7. (Singapore) Steven Tan
8. (Japan) Takuya Oosawa

GP Kraków (3–4 November)

- Format: Standard
- Attendance: 849
1. (United States) Paul Cheon
2. (France) Amiel Tenenbaum
3. (Austria) Armin Birner
4. (France) Olivier Ruel
5. (Slovakia) Robert Jacko
6. (Italy) David Besso
7. (France) Guillaume Wafo-Tapa
8. (Slovakia) Matej Zatlkaj

GP Kitakyuushuu (10–11 November)

- Format: Limited
- Attendance: 354
1. (Japan) Junya Iyanaga
2. (Japan) Shouta Yasooka
3. (Japan) Akira Asahara
4. (France) Olivier Ruel
5. (Japan) Kazuya Hirabayashi
6. (South Korea) Jun Young Park
7. (Japan) Kenji Tsumura
8. (Japan) Chih-Chun Tsai

GP Daytona Beach (17–18 November)

- Format: Limited
- Attendance: 636
1. (United States) Seth Manfield
2. (Brazil) Paulo Vitor Damo da Rosa
3. (United States) Tillman Bragg
4. (United States) Tanon Grace
5. (United States) Gabe Walls
6. (United States) Steven Wolansky
7. (United States) Kyle Miller
8. (United States) Alex Lieberman

== 2007 World Championships – New York City (6–9 December 2007) ==
The World Championships began with the induction of the third class into the hall of fame. The inductees were Kai Budde, Zvi Mowshowitz, Tsuyoshi Fujita, Nicolai Herzog, and Randy Buehler. In the individual competition Uri Peleg became the first Israeli, not only to reach the top eight, but also to win a Pro Tour. For Mori it was his third consecutive Worlds Top 8 appearance. In the team competition, the Swiss defeated the Austrian team in the finals

=== Tournament data ===
Prize pool: $215,600 (individual) + $192,200 (national teams)
Players: 386
Formats: Standard, Booster Draft (Lorwyn), Legacy
Head Judge: Mike Guptil

=== Top 8 ===
Quarter-finals
1	Christoph Huber	1
8	Koutarou Ootsuka	3
4	Katsuhiro Mori	0
5	Uri Peleg	3
2	Gabriel Nassif	3
7	Roel van Heeswijk	1
3	Yoshitako Nakano	2
6	Patrick Chapin	3

Semi-finals
Koutarou Ootsuka	1
Uri Peleg	3
Gabriel Nassif	2
Patrick Chapin	3

Finals
Uri Peleg	3
Patrick Chapin	1

=== Final standings ===
Place	Player	Prize	Pro Points	Comment
1	(Israel) Uri Peleg	$40,000	25	1st Israeli to win a Pro Tour
2	(United States) Patrick Chapin	$22,000	20	3rd Final day
3	(France) Gabriel Nassif	$15,000	16	8th Final day
4	(Japan) Koutarou Ootsuka	$14,000	16	
5	(Switzerland) Christoph Huber	$11,000	12	
6	(Japan) Yoshitako Nakano	$10,000	12	
7	(Japan) Katsuhiro Mori	$9,000	12	3rd Final day
8	(Netherlands) Roel van Heeswijk	$8,000	12	

=== National team competition ===
1. Switzerland (Nico Bohny, Manuel Bucher, Raphael Genari, Christoph Huber)
2. Austria (Thomas Preyer, Stefan Stradner, David Reitbauer, Helmut Summersberger)

== Pro Player of the year final standings ==
After the World Championship Tomoharu Saitou was awarded the Pro Player of the year title.

Rank	Player	Pro Points
1	(Japan) Tomoharu Saitou	68
2	(Japan) Kenji Tsumura	62
3	(France) Guillaume Wafo-Tapa	59
4	(Japan) Shingou Kurihara	57
5	(France) Olivier Ruel	54

== Performance by country ==
Japan players dominated the season, making 16 Top 8 appearances although they had only about half as many players on the Pro Tour as the United States, which had the secondmost Top 8 appearances at 9. Both countries generated 21 level 4+ pro players in this season. For the Netherlands despite having generated 7 level 4+ pro players in the season success on the Pro Tour was almost elusive with a single 8th place being their only Top 8 appearance.

Country	T8	Q*	Q/T8	GT	Best Player (PPts)
Japan	16	171	11	21	Tomoharu Saitou (68)
United States	9	330	37	21	Paul Cheon (52)
France	4	108	27	7	Guillaume Wafo-Tapa (59)
Germany	3	83	28	6	André Müller (36)
Italy	1	61	61	0	Giulio Barra (18)
Netherlands	1	54	54	7	Frank Karsten (37)
Spain	0	55	55	1	Saul Aguado (20)

T8 = Number of players from that country appearing in a Pro Tour Top 8; Q* = Number of players from that country participating in Pro Tours (PT San Diego is missing as no country breakdown is available for that event); GT = Gravy Trainers (aka players with a Pro Players Club level of 4 or more) from that country generated in the 2007 season; Best Player (PPts) = Player with the most Pro Points from that country, Pro Points of that player in brackets.
