= Masahiko Morita =

Japanese Magic: The Gathering player

Masahiko Morita 森田 雅彦
- Nationality: Japanese
- Pro Tour debut: 2001 Worlds Toronto
- Winnings: US$91,095
- Pro Tour wins (Top 8): 0 (0)
- Grand Prix wins (Top 8): 4 (16)
- Lifetime Pro Points: 213
- Planeswalker Level: 47 (Archmage)

Masahiko Morita (森田 雅彦) is a Japanese Magic: The Gathering player. Despite never having reached the top eight of a Pro Tour, he is one of the most successful players on the Grand Prix circuit, especially on home turf. He is one of the players with the most lifetime Pro Points without a Pro Tour top eight, and is one of fourteen players to have won four or more Grand Prix.

== Achievements ==
Season	Event type	Location	Format	Date	Rank
2000–01	Grand Prix	Hiroshima	Sealed and Booster Draft	27–28 January 2001	4
2000–01	Grand Prix	Yokohama	Team Limited	12–13 May 2001	2
2000–01	Nationals	Tokyo	Standard and Booster Draft	2–3 June 2001	3
2001–02	Grand Prix	Shizuoka, Shizuoka	Sealed and Booster Draft	13–14 October 2001	2
2001–02	Grand Prix	Fukuoka	Sealed and Booster Draft	16–17 February 2002	2
2001–02	Grand Prix	Nagoya	Team Limited	11–12 May 2002	1
2002–03	Grand Prix	Sapporo	Block Constructed	24–25 August 2002	2
2002–03	Masters	Venice	Team Limited	20–23 March 2003	1
2002–03	Grand Prix	Bangkok	Standard	12–13 July 2003	5
2003–04	Grand Prix	Yokohama	Block Constructed	22–24 August 2003	5
2003–04	Grand Prix	Sendai	Booster Draft	20–21 March 2004	2
2003–04	Grand Prix	Kuala Lumpur	Standard	24–25 July 2004	1
2005	Grand Prix	Yokohama	Rochester Draft	20–21 November 2004	5
2005	Grand Prix	Osaka	Team Limited	8–9 January 2005	1
2005	Grand Prix	Boston	Extended	5–6 February 2005	6
2005	Grand Prix	Taipei	Block Constructed	6–7 August 2005	2
2005	Grand Prix	Kitakyushu	Extended	5–6 November 2005	5
2007	Grand Prix	Bangkok	Sealed and Booster Draft	27–28 October 2007	1

Last updated: 14 August 2009
Source: Wizards.com
