= Julien Nuijten =

Dutch card game champion (born 1980s)

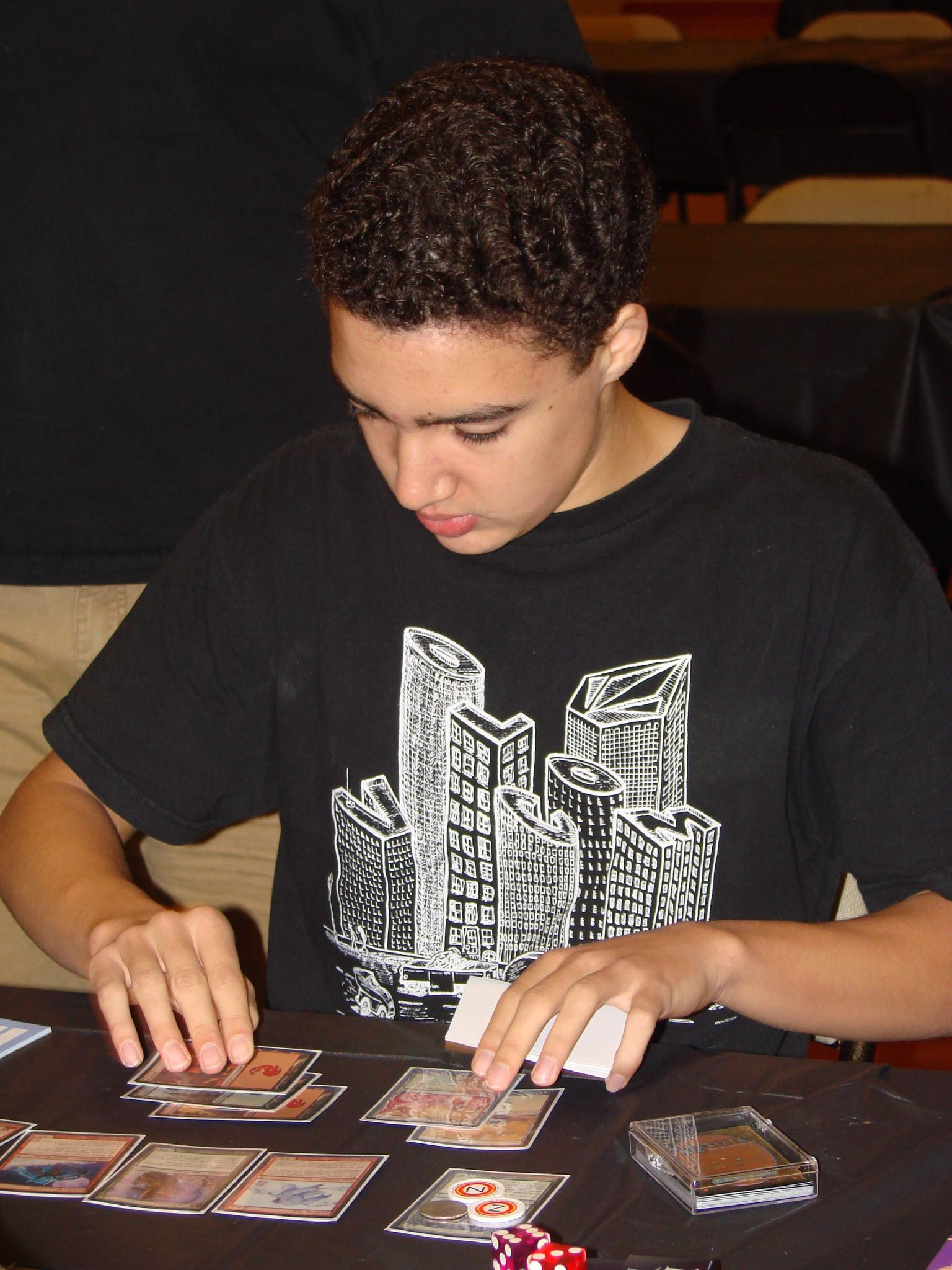
- Nuijten playing Magic in 2006
- Born: 1988 or 1989 (age 37–38); The Netherlands
- Pro Tour debut: 2003–2004
- Winnings: $111,290
- Grand Prix wins (Top 8): 2 (6)

World Series of Poker
- Money finishes: 2
- Highest WSOP Main Event finish: 8, 2010

Julien Nuijten is a Dutch card player and culinarian. In 2004, at the age of 15, he became the youngest player to ever win the Magic: The Gathering card game world championship. Two years later he shared the team world championship. He moved to competitive poker, where he won $222,940 by winning the first Latin American Poker Tour in 2008. After leaving professional poker, he worked as a cook and culinary entrepreneur.

== Magic: The Gathering ==
Julien Nuijten was born in 1988 or 1989 (age 37–38). He started playing the fantasy collectible card game Magic: The Gathering when he was 12 years old. Three years later he began playing at the highest competitive level, the Magic Pro Tour in the 2003–2004 season. He placed third in Grand Prix Brussels in May 2004. Then, on 5 September 2004, Julien Nuijten won the Magic: The Gathering World Championship in San Francisco. He was 15 years old, and the youngest world champion and the youngest winner of any Magic Pro Tour title. His win made the Netherlands the only country other than the United States to have won the championship twice, after Tom van de Logt won in 2001. He also won the 2003–2004 Rookie of the Year award, given to a player that had not participated in any Pro Tour or World Championship tournament in any previous season. His total award of $52,366 was the largest amount ever won at a collectible card game tournament to that point, outpacing the $45,000 won by Jon Finkel at the 2000 Magic World Championship. He used the money to buy his brother a car.

In the Magic 2005 Pro Tour, Nuijten won Grand Prix tournaments in September in Mexico City and in November in Copenhagen. In the 2006 Pro Tour, Nuijten placed sixth in Dortmund in February, and fifth in Hiroshima in August, then in December, in Paris, Nuijten was part of the three man Dutch team that won the 2006 Magic team world championship.

From 2004 through 2007, Nuijten wrote 32 English language Magic articles for the website StarCityGames. Nuijten says he played Magic professionally for three years, though he was still in school at the time, and living with his parents, so, he says, it was easy for him to call it that.

== Poker ==
After Magic, when he was 18, Nuijten moved to competitive poker. He said that Magic was more fun to play, and designed better, but the potential winnings from poker were so much greater; a player could not make a living playing Magic, but could playing poker. He quit studying to play poker full time. Nuijten advanced to the highest level tables on Everest Poker, a European online gambling site, and moved from the Netherlands to Dublin, for financial reasons (the Netherlands taxed gambling winnings at 29%).

In May 2008, Nuijten won the first Latin American Poker Tour in Rio de Janeiro, earning $222,940.

Since Nuijten was only 20 years old in 2009, he could not participate in the largest tournament, the World Series of Poker, in Nevada near Las Vegas, where poker players needed to be 21 years or older. That year he asked the Latin American Poker Tour organization whether he would have the same problem in Argentina, where the second tournament was being held. They told him minimum age was 21, so Nuijten stayed out of the tournament, only to find out that German player Dominik Nitsche, who ended up winning the event, was 18 years old.

From 2008 to 2009, Nuijten wrote a Dutch language poker column for Holland Poker and Poker City, and from 2009 to 2014 wrote an irregular series of articles on poker strategy for PokerNews. By August 2009, Nuijten returned to Amsterdam from Dublin, saying it was too lonely without his friends. He says he got tired of poker after playing millions of hands, when it became mostly about the money, which, while it wasn't bad, wasn't coming in as much as it used to. Nuijten tried quitting poker twice, once without a plan, and once to go back to studying, but each time came back to it when he found himself bored, and that his studies did not interest him. In September 2009, Nuijten took ninth place at the European Poker Tour in Barcelona, winning €50,000. He left poker as a profession after five years of play.

== Culinary work ==
Nuijten says he always enjoyed being in the kitchen, and had spent the summer of 2010 in Las Vegas going to the barbecue every day. Working as a cook was his backup plan after leaving poker. He tried working in a sandwich restaurant, and going to cooking school for a while, then leaving as it conflicted with work. In the summer of 2013, Nuijten managed an Amsterdam barbecue restaurant, then worked at a salad bar for a couple of weeks, then became a cook at the Marathonweg Amsterdam restaurant. In 2017, Nuijten partnered with the head chef from Marathonweg to found Flexkeuken, a Zaandam site that offered professional kitchen workspaces for rent, a half day at a time. One of their renters was Diego Buik, creator of the world's most expensive hamburger at €2,050.

Nuijten continued to play competitive Magic irregularly. In November 2018, he finished in the top 8 at Magic Grand Prix Warsaw.
