= David Humpherys =

Former American Magic: The Gathering player (1972-)

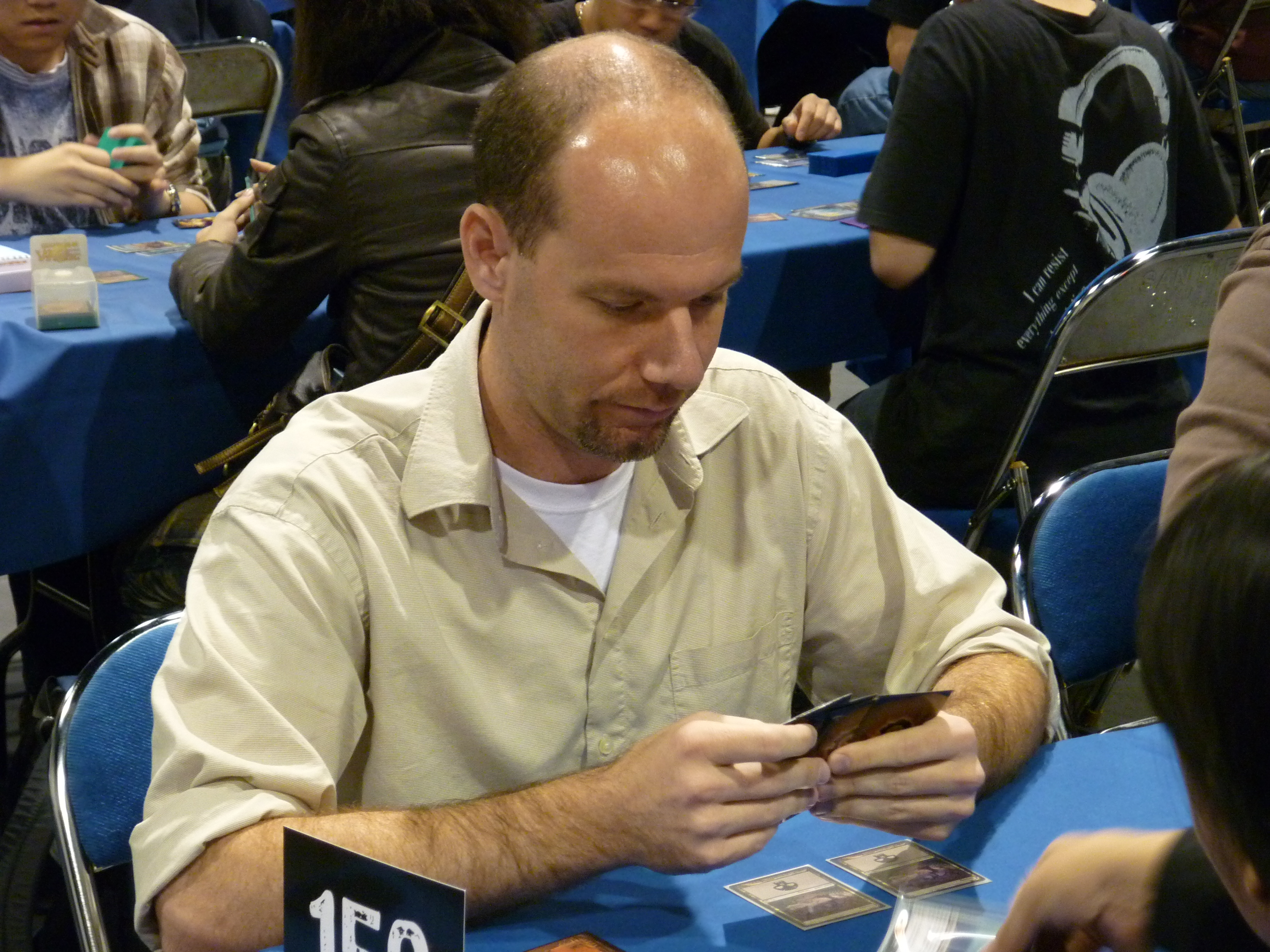
- Nickname: The Hump
- Born: 11 June 1972 (age 54)
- Nationality: (United States) American
- Pro Tour debut: 1996 Pro Tour New York
- Winnings: US$ 144,242
- Pro Tour wins (Top 8): 1 (5)
- Grand Prix wins (Top 8): 2 (5)
- Median Pro Tour Finish: 52
- Lifetime Pro Points: 292
- Highest Constructed Rating: 2181
- Highest Limited Rating: 2195
- Planeswalker Level: 46 (Archmage)

David Humpherys (born 11 June 1972) is a former professional Magic: The Gathering player from the United States. Humpherys now works for the company that produced Magic, Wizards of the Coast. He was inducted to the Magic: The Gathering Pro Tour Hall of Fame in November 2006.

== Accomplishments ==
=== Top 8 appearances ===
Season	Event type	Location	Format	Date	Rank
1998–99	Pro Tour	New York	Block Constructed	30 June–2 May 1999	4
1998–99	Nationals	United States	Special	03–04 July 1999	7
1999–00	Pro Tour	Washington D.C.	Team Limited	3–5 September 1999	1
1999–00	Invitational	Kuala Lumpur	Special	2–5 March 2000	4
1999–00	Grand Prix	St. Louis	Team Limited	12–14 May 2000	3
1999–00	Grand Prix	Pittsburgh	Team Limited	23–25 June 2000	4
2001–02	Grand Prix	Minneapolis	Block Constructed	28–30 September 2001	1
2001–02	Pro Tour	New Orleans	Extended	1–4 November 2001	4
2001–02	Masters	San Diego	Standard	1–4 November 2001	2
2001–02	Worlds	Sydney	Special	14–18 August 2002	4
2002–03	Invitational	Seattle	Special	18–20 October 2002	7
2002–03	Masters	Chicago	Standard	17–19 January 2003	5
2002–03	Worlds	Berlin	Special	6–10 August 2003	4
2003–04	Grand Prix	Oakland	Limited	7–8 February 2003	2
2003–04	Nationals	Kansas City	Special	18–20 June 2004	7

Last updated: 4 April 2009
Source: Wizards.com

=== Other accomplishments ===
- Magic: The Gathering Hall of Fame class of 2006
