= Tsuyoshi Fujita =

Japanese rugby union player (born 1961)

- Born: January 27, 1961 (age 65) Osaka Prefecture, Japan
- Height: 5 ft 10 in (1.78 m)
- Weight: 198 lb (90 kg)
- School: Osaka Institute of Technology
- University: Meiji University

Rugby union career
- Position: Hooker
Amateur team(s)
Years	Team	Apps	(Points)
????-1979	Osaka Institute of Technology		
1979-1980	Meiji University RFC		
Senior career
Years	Team	Apps	(Points)
1980-1988	Nippon Steel		
1988-1991	IBM Japan		
International career
Years	Team	Apps	(Points)
1980–1991	Japan	32	(16)
Coaching career
- Years: Team
- 199?-1999: IBM Big Blue
- 2000-2003: Kubota Spears
- 2003-2014: Meiji University
- 2014-: Nihon University

Tsuyoshi Fujita (藤田剛, Fujita Tsuyoshi), (born Osaka Prefecture, January 27, 1961) is a former Japanese rugby union player. He played as hooker.

== Career ==
He started his career playing for the Osaka Institute of Technology and then, for Meiji University. In 1979, Fujita grabbed a regular position in his university years, contributing to the victory in the National University Championship of the same year. In the 1982 season, he served as captain for the Meiji University team. In 1980, he debuted for Japan in a test match against Netherlands at Hilversum, on October 4, 1980. Afterwards, he served as hooker for the Japan national rugby union team for many years, and played in the 1987 and 1991 Rugby World Cups consecutively. In the 1987 Rugby World Cup, Fujita played all the three pool games. After graduating from Meiji University, he played for Nippon Steel, but then, moved for IBM Japan, which he also coached. After retiring as player, he coached several teams such as IBM Big Blue, Kubota Spears, Meiji University and Nihon University RFC.
