= Gary Wise =

Canadian Magic: The Gathering player

- Nationality: Canadian
- Winnings: US$ 133,773
- Pro Tour wins (Top 8): 1 (4)
- Grand Prix wins (Top 8): 0 (?)
- Lifetime Pro Points: 240
- Planeswalker Level: 46 (Archmage)

Gary Wise is a Canadian former professional Magic: The Gathering player. He was inducted to the Magic: The Gathering Pro Tour Hall of Fame in November 2006. He also wrote the "Wise Words" and "Limited Skills" articles.

Gary Wise is also involved with poker. Gary now writes for Bluff Magazine as well his own poker strategy website called WiseHandPoker.com where he details individual hands played by some of the most well known professional poker players.

Not only does Gary write for the above-mentioned sites but he has also been known to provide content for the World Poker Tour website as well as some other high-profile poker sites.

== Magic: the Gathering Accomplishments ==
- Magic: The Gathering Hall of Famer
- Top 8 at Worlds (1999)
- 1st at Pro Tour-New York (2000)
- Top 8 at Canadian Nationals (2001)
- Top 8 at English Nationals (2002)
- Top 4 at Pro Tour-Boston (2002)
- Top 4 at Pro Tour-Boston (2003)

== Writing ==
Gary followed a popular trend in his early years on the Magic: the Gathering Pro Tour, putting his experiences into tournament reports in order to share them with the Magic community. He developed a following and became the first paid writer for the Magic Dojo, a now-defunct website that served as the heart of the online Magic community in the late 1990s.

After a second stint with the Dojo, Gary was hired by sideboard.com, the official website of the Magic:the Gathering Pro Tour as staff writer and columnist. He served in that capacity from 1998–2003. During 1999–2001 he frequented an IRC (Internet Relay Chat) Magic the Gathering channel. This room was named channel MTGWACKY and has since gone defunct.

Wise travelled to Vegas and stayed the full six weeks during the 2004 World Series, his first foray into the tournament poker world. A year later, he embarked on his poker writing career, co-founding wisehandpoker.com and the Wise Hand of the Day, which was widely available on websites across the internet.

The beginning of his writing career signalled the end of his professional poker pursuits, with the demands of running a business not allowing time for both.

After ongoing work with both Bluff Magazine and World Poker Tour, Wise began his tenure with ESPN in May 2007, staying with the company until late 2012, a period that saw him produce over 400 published works. These included annual forays on to the front page carousel for the World Series of Poker, at which he was a regular attendee on ESPN's behalf. His byline also appeared in the website's tennis, Mixed Martial Arts and Page Two sections, as well as ESPN:The Magazine.

In September 2012, Gary was hired as Manager of Social Media at the online gaming Website Pinnacle Sports.

== Game Culture ==
Gary's father, Michael Wise, was a key contributor to the competitive Scrabble Community, with that game's Director of the Year award being named after the father following his passing in 1997. Michael's example as director of "Club three" in Toronto, curiosity with the mathematics and literature of sports and other games, and constant participation in varied competitions, served as the example Gary would ultimately follow.

Gary's writings have been geared more towards the people who play the games than how those games are played. He's focused primarily on the cultural fabric their stories weave, recording the oral histories of the games he's covered for posterity. With poker's popularization, his conversion was a natural one.

== Switching Games ==
Wise began playing Magic: the Gathering in 1995, attending his first Pro Tour in 1997. It was through Pro Tour associations that he was introduced to Texas Hold'em.

For the years 2000–2004, Wise earned income from both games. He earned repeated appearances in Magic's Masters Series, a lucrative invite-only tournament in which all thirty-two participants received payments.

It was during this time that his interest started to turn from Magic to poker, joining well known poker personalities David Williams, Eric Froehlich, Noah Boeken and a host of others in making the switch.

In 2004, he retired from the Magic: Pro Tour to focus on poker full-time.
