= Planform =

Planform may refer to:

- The outline of a shape, in a multiview orthographic projection;
- An aircraft wing's silhouette, when viewed from the top or bottom.
