= Stereotomy (descriptive geometry) =

Cutting three-dimensional solids into particular shapes

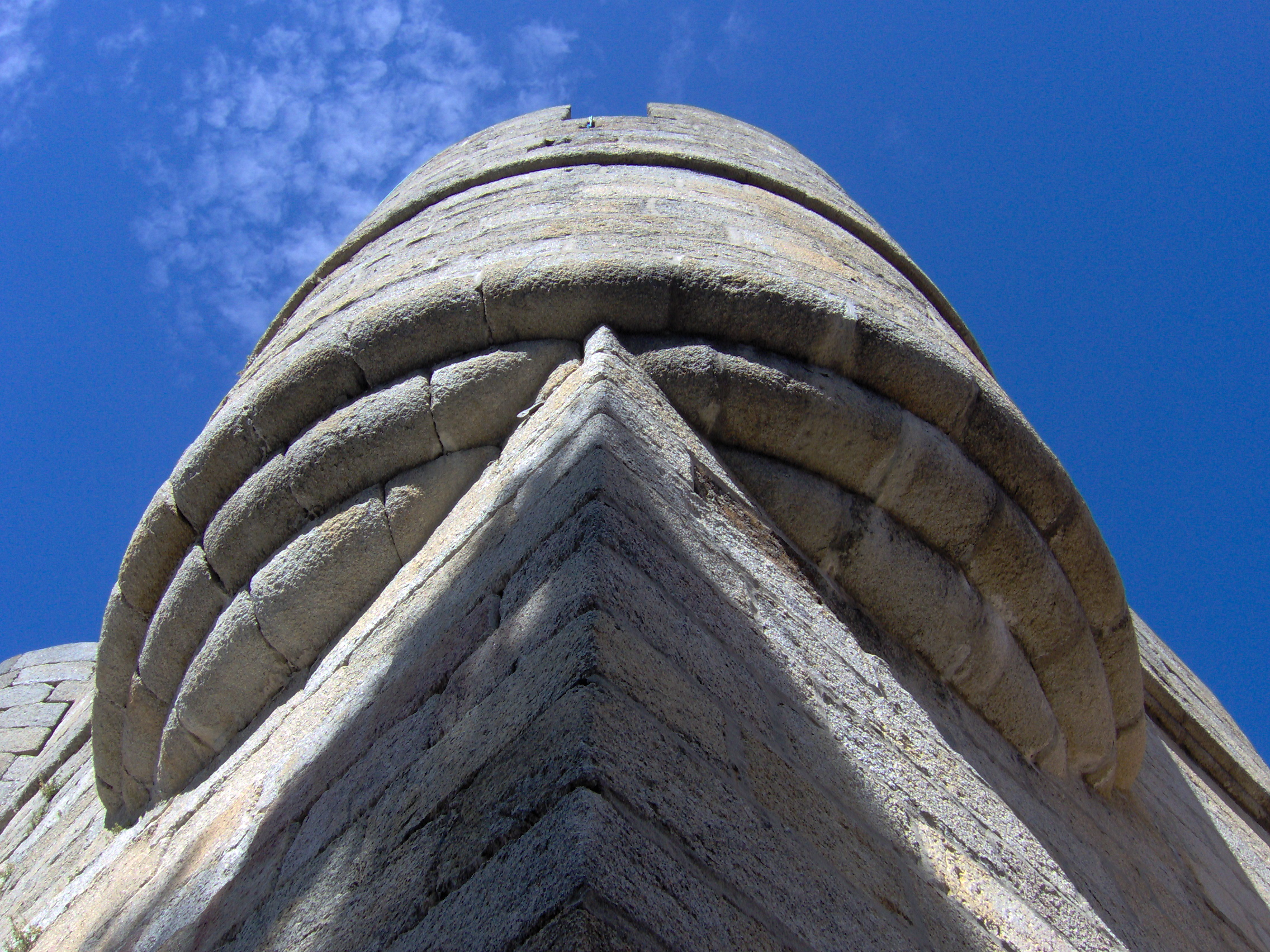
Stereotomy of the Condes de Benavente Castle (corner detail), Puebla de Sanabria, Spain

Stereotomy (Greek: στερεός (stereós) "solid" and τομή (tomē) "cut ") is the art and science of cutting three-dimensional solids into particular shapes. Typically this involves materials such as stone or wood which is cut to be assembled into complex structures (wall, vault, arch, etc.). In practice, the engineer makes a drawing of the intended stonework, showing where the joints in the face are to be located, and the stone cutter then details each block and cuts it to fit exactly with the others.

== Stereotomy and descriptive geometry ==
Stereotomy is strongly associated with stonecutting and has a very long history. Descriptive geometry can be considered as an evolution of stereotomy.

In technical drawing stereotomy is sometimes referred to as descriptive geometry, and "is concerned with two-dimensional representations of three dimensional objects. Plane projections and perspective drawings of solid figures are used to describe and analyze their properties for engineering and manufacturing purposes. Attention is paid to the properties of surfaces, including normal lines and tangent planes."

== Sources ==
- Calvo-López, José (2020). "Problems". Stereotomy. Vol. 4. Cham: Springer International Publishing. pp. 573–642. doi:10.1007/978-3-030-43218-8_12. ISBN 978-3-030-43217-1.
