= True length =

Net of a dodecahedron. All edges in this net have true length.

In descriptive geometry, true length is any distance between points that is not foreshortened by the view type. In a three-dimensional Euclidean space, lines with true length are parallel to the projection plane. For example, in a top view of a pyramid, which is an orthographic projection, the base edges (which are parallel to the projection plane) have true length, whereas the remaining edges in this view are not true lengths. The same is true with an orthographic side view of a pyramid. If any face of a pyramid was parallel to the projection plane (for a particular view), all edges would demonstrate true length.

Examples of views in which all edges have true length are nets.
