= Planar projection =

3D projection in which points in 3D space are linearly mapped onto a 2D plane

Planar projections are the subset of 3D graphical projections constructed by linearly mapping points in three-dimensional space to points on a two-dimensional projection plane. The projected point on the plane is chosen such that it is collinear with the corresponding three-dimensional point and the centre of projection. The lines connecting these points are commonly referred to as projectors.

The centre of projection can be thought of as the location of the observer, while the plane of projection is the surface on which the two dimensional projected image of the scene is recorded or from which it is viewed (e.g., photographic negative, photographic print, computer monitor). When the centre of projection is at a finite distance from the projection plane, a perspective projection is obtained. When the centre of projection is at infinity, all the projectors are parallel, and the corresponding subset of planar projections are referred to as parallel projections.

== Mathematical formulation ==
Mathematically, planar projections are linear transformations acting on a point in three-dimensional space $\mathbf{a}_{x,y,z}$ to give a point $\mathbf{b}_{u,v}$ on the projection plane. These transformations consist of various compositions of the five transformations: orthographic projection, rotation, shear, translation and perspective.

== Map uses ==
It is also used in maps to show the planet Earth and other planets or objects in space. This is good for maps of close-up areas.
