= Potting bench =

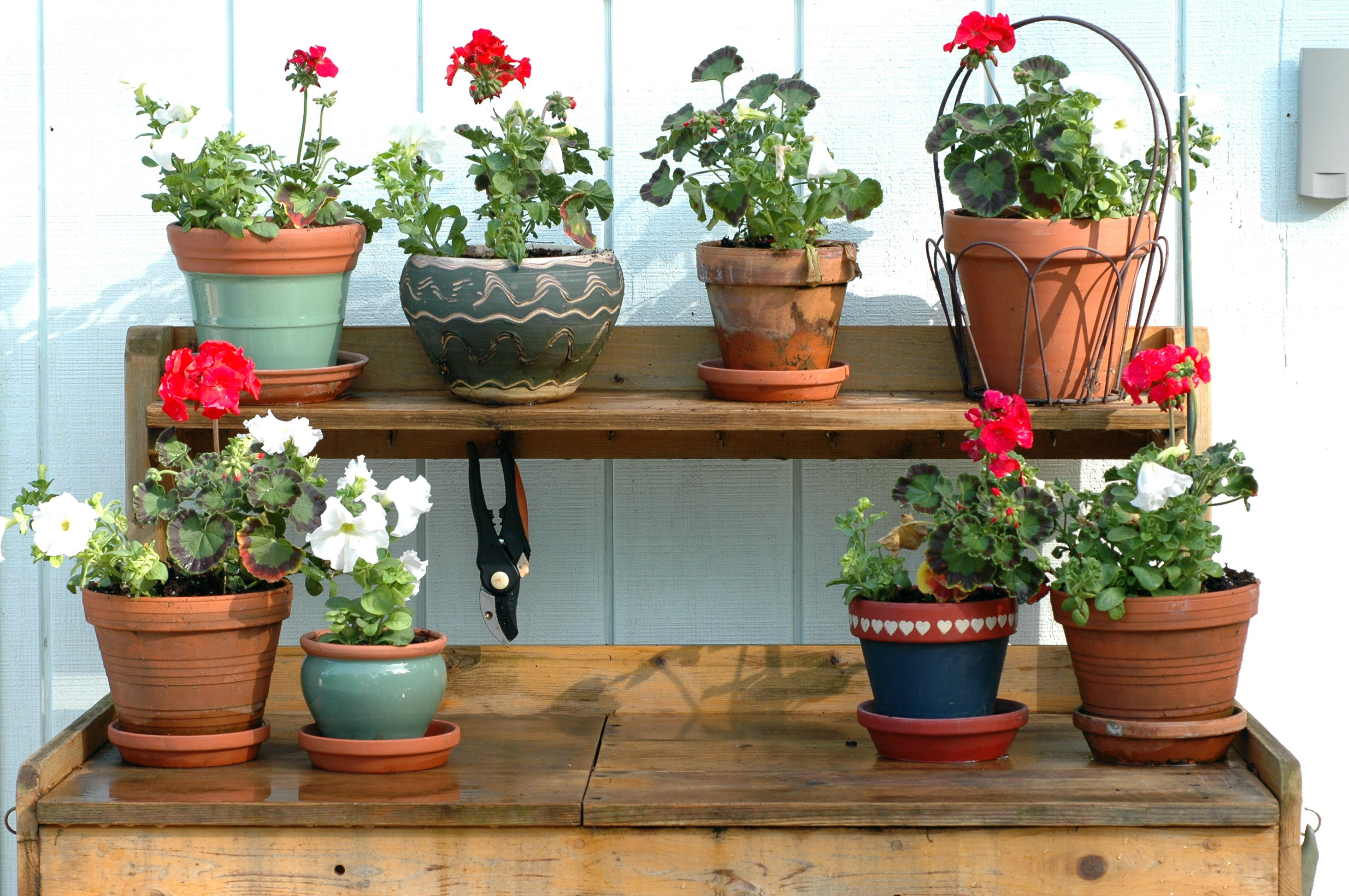

A potting bench or planting table is a kind of workbench used for small gardening tasks such as transplanting seedlings. A basic potting bench has a work surface at bench height, comfortable for a standing person; and storage for potting soil, pots, and tools. The same furniture is often also used to display potted plants, even indoors.

Since this type of furniture is often exposed to soil, water, and sunlight, it must be made from weather-resistant materials if it is not to decay rapidly. Cedar wood is a popular rot-resistant choice, but a budget-friendly option is pressure-treated lumber with a weather-resistant finish. Plastic potting benches are affordable, and metal construction may be considered if corrosion can be controlled.

Some potting benches are small and portable; others are fixed into the side of a greenhouse. Some designs include a dry sink for soil storage, a water or drain hookup, or a cold frame. As they are often custom-built by the gardener, styles vary greatly — and do it yourself construction plans are widely available.

== See also ==
- Gardening
- Transplanting
