= Pohlke's theorem =

Pohlke's theorem is the fundamental theorem of axonometry. It was established 1853 by the German painter and teacher of descriptive geometry Karl Wilhelm Pohlke. The first proof of the theorem was published 1864 by the German mathematician Hermann Amandus Schwarz, who was a student of Pohlke. Therefore the theorem is sometimes called theorem of Pohlke and Schwarz, too.

== The theorem ==
Pohlke's theorem

- Three arbitrary line sections $\overline O\overline U,\overline O\overline V,\overline O\overline W$ in a plane originating at point $\overline O$, which are not contained in a line, can be considered as the parallel projection of three edges $OU,OV,OW$ of a cube.

For a mapping of a unit cube, one has to apply an additional scaling either in the space or in the plane. Because a parallel projection and a scaling preserves ratios one can map an arbitrary point $P=(x,y,z)$ by the axonometric procedure below.

Pohlke's theorem can be stated in terms of linear algebra as:

- Any affine mapping of the 3-dimensional space onto a plane can be considered as the composition of a similarity and a parallel projection.

== Application to axonometry ==
the principle of axonometric projection

Pohlke's theorem is the justification for the following easy procedure to construct a scaled parallel projection of a 3-dimensional object using coordinates,:

1. Choose the images of the coordinate axes, not contained in a line.
2. Choose for any coordinate axis forshortenings $v_x,v_y,v_z >0 .$
3. The image $\overline P$ of a point $P=(x,y,z)$ is determined by the three steps, starting at point $\overline O$:

go $v_x\cdot x$ in $\overline x$-direction, then
go $v_y\cdot y$ in $\overline y$-direction, then
go $v_z\cdot z$ in $\overline z$-direction and

4. mark the point as $\overline P$.

In order to get undistorted pictures, one has to choose the images of the axes and the forshortenings carefully (see Axonometry). In order to get an orthographic projection only the images of the axes are free and the forshortenings are determined. (see de:orthogonale Axonometrie).

== Remarks on Schwarz's proof ==
Schwarz formulated and proved the more general statement:

- The vertices of any quadrilateral can be considered as an oblique parallel projection of the vertices of a tetrahedron that is similar to a given tetrahedron.

and used a theorem of L’Huilier:

- Every triangle can be considered as the orthographic projection of a triangle of a given shape.
