= Axonometric projection =

Type of orthographic projection

Axonometric projection is a type of orthographic projection used for creating a pictorial drawing of an object, where the object is rotated around one or more of its axes to reveal multiple sides.

== Overview ==
Classification of Axonometric projection and some 3D projections

"Axonometry" means "to measure along the axes". In German literature, axonometry is based on Pohlke's theorem, such that the scope of axonometric projection could encompass every type of parallel projection, including not only orthographic projection (and multiview projection), but also oblique projection. However, outside of German literature, the term "axonometric" is sometimes used only to distinguish between orthographic views where the principal axes of an object are not orthogonal to the projection plane, and orthographic views in which the principal axes of the object are orthogonal to the projection plane. (In multiview projection these would be called auxiliary views and primary views, respectively.) Confusingly, the term "orthographic projection" is also sometimes reserved only for the primary views.

Thus, in German literature, "axonometric projection" might be considered synonymous with "parallel projection", overall; but in English literature, an "axonometric projection" might be considered synonymous with an "auxiliary view" (versus a "primary view") in a "multiview orthographic projection".

With an axonometric projection, the scale of an object does not depend on its location (i.e., an object in the "foreground" has the same scale as an object in the "background"); consequently, such pictures look distorted, as human vision and photography use perspective projection, in which the perceived scale of an object depends on its distance and location from the viewer. This distortion, the direct result of a presence or absence of foreshortening, is especially evident if the object is mostly composed of rectangular features. Despite this limitation, axonometric projection can be useful for purposes of illustration, especially because it allows for simultaneously relaying precise measurements.

== Three types ==
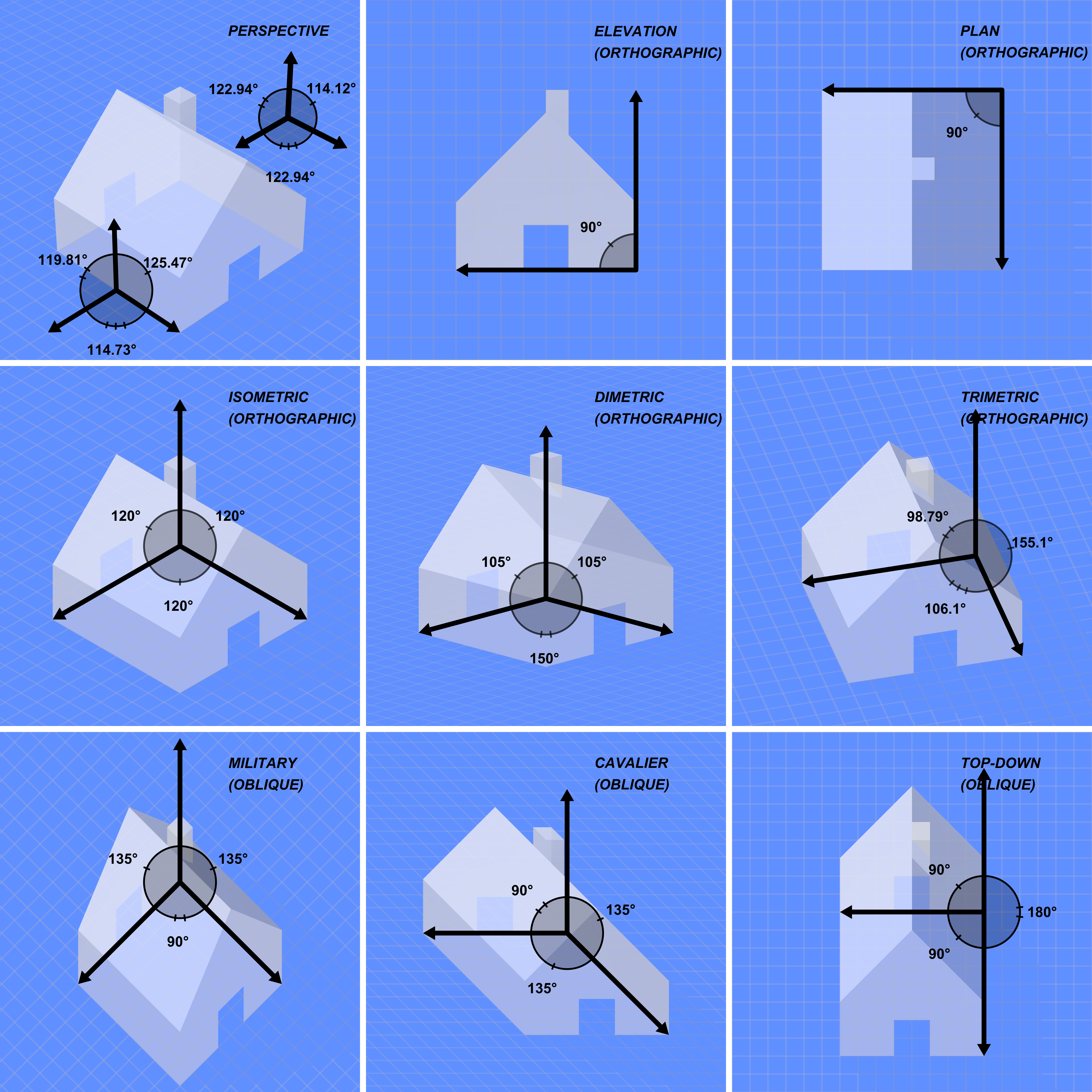
Comparison of several types of graphical projection

Various projections and how they are produced

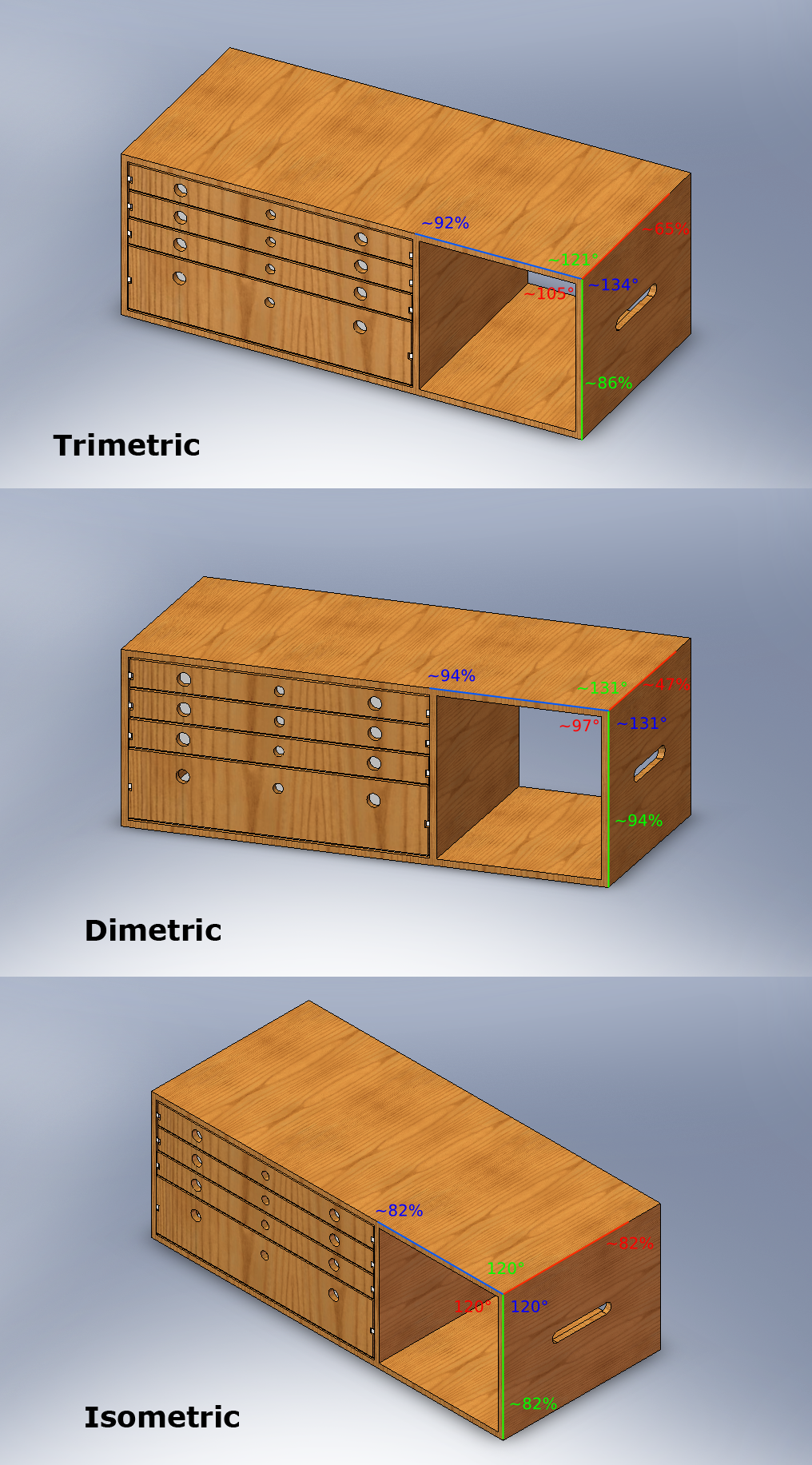
The three axonometric views. The percentages show the amount of foreshortening.

The three types of axonometric projection are isometric projection, dimetric projection, and trimetric projection, depending on the exact angle by which the view deviates from the orthogonal. Typically in axonometric drawing, as in other types of pictorials, one axis of space is shown to be vertical.

In isometric projection, the most commonly used form of axonometric projection in engineering drawing, the direction of viewing is such that the three axes of space appear equally foreshortened, and there is a common angle of 120° between them. As the distortion caused by foreshortening is uniform, the proportionality between lengths is preserved, and the axes share a common scale; this eases one's ability to take measurements directly from the drawing. Another advantage is that 120° angles are easily constructed using only a compass and straightedge.

In dimetric projection, the direction of viewing is such that two of the three axes of space appear equally foreshortened, of which the attendant scale and angles of presentation are determined according to the angle of viewing; the scale of the third direction is determined separately. Dimensional approximations are common in dimetric drawings.

In trimetric projection, the direction of viewing is such that all of the three axes of space appear unequally foreshortened. The scale along each of the three axes and the angles among them are determined separately as dictated by the angle of viewing. Dimensional approximations in trimetric drawings are common, and trimetric perspective is seldom used in technical drawings.

== History ==
Axonometry originated in China. Unlike the linear perspective in European art whose perspective was objective, or looking from the outside, Chinese art used parallel projections within the painting that allowed the viewer to consider both the space and the ongoing progression of time in one scroll. The concept of isometry had existed in a rough empirical form for centuries, well before Professor William Farish (1759–1837) of Cambridge University was the first to provide detailed rules for isometric drawing.

Farish published his ideas in the 1822 paper "On Isometric Perspective", in which he recognized the "need for accurate technical working drawings free of optical distortion. This would lead him to formulate isometry. Isometry means "equal measures" because the same scale is used for height, width, and depth".

From the middle of the 19th century, according to Jan Krikke (2006) isometry became an "invaluable tool for engineers, and soon thereafter axonometry and isometry were incorporated in the curriculum of architectural training courses in Europe and the U.S. The popular acceptance of axonometry came in the 1920s, when modernist architects from the Bauhaus and De Stijl embraced it". De Stijl architects like Theo van Doesburg used axonometry for their architectural designs, which caused a sensation when exhibited in Paris in 1923".

Since the 1920s axonometry, or parallel perspective, has provided an important graphic technique for artists, architects, and engineers. Like linear perspective, axonometry helps depict three-dimensional space on a two-dimensional picture plane. It usually comes as a standard feature of CAD systems and other visual computing tools. According to science author and Medium journalist Jan Krikke, axonometry, and the pictorial grammar that goes with it, has taken on a new significance with the introduction of visual computing and engineering drawing.

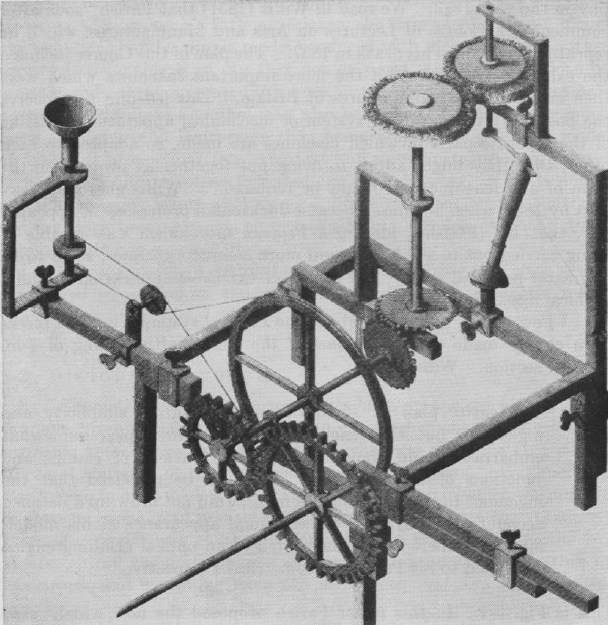
Optical-grinding engine model (1822), drawn in 30° isometric perspective

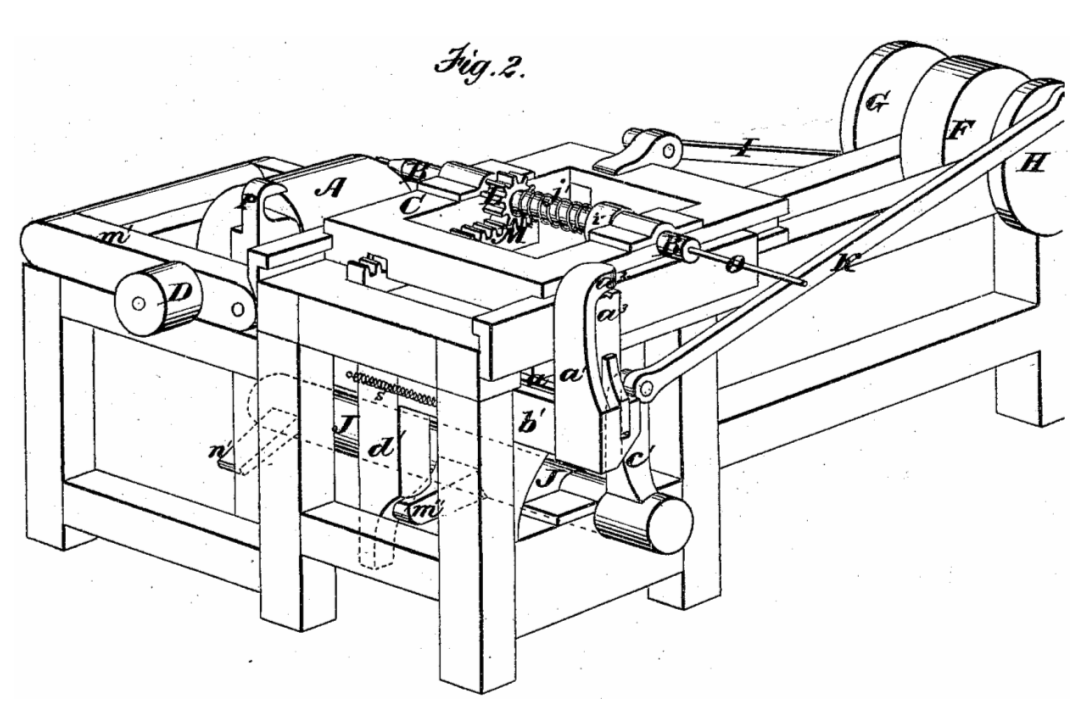
Example of a dimetric perspective drawing from a US Patent (1874)

Example of a trimetric projection showing the shape of the Bank of China Tower in Hong Kong.

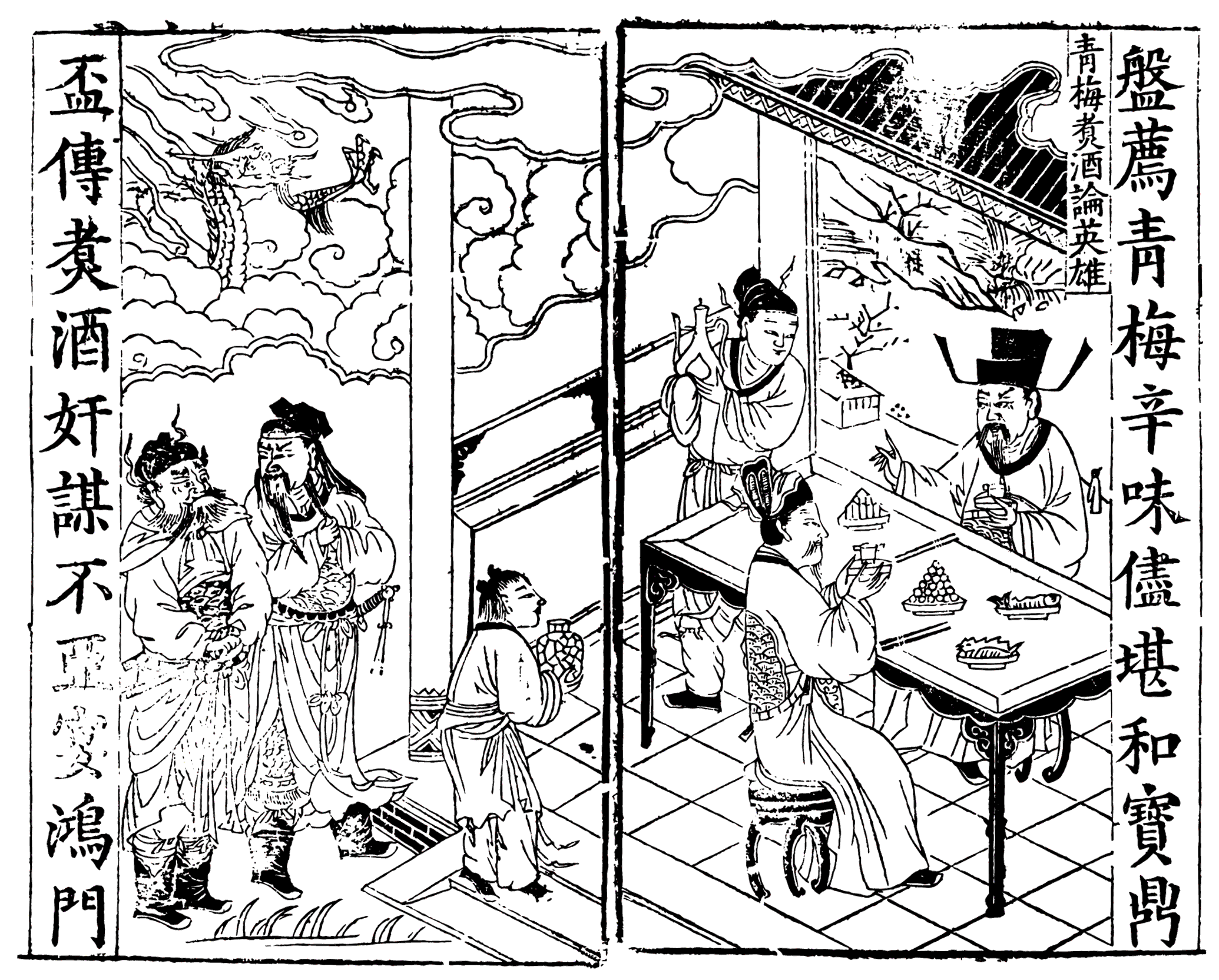
Example of isometric projection in Chinese art in an illustrated edition of the Romance of the Three Kingdoms, China, c. 15th century CE.

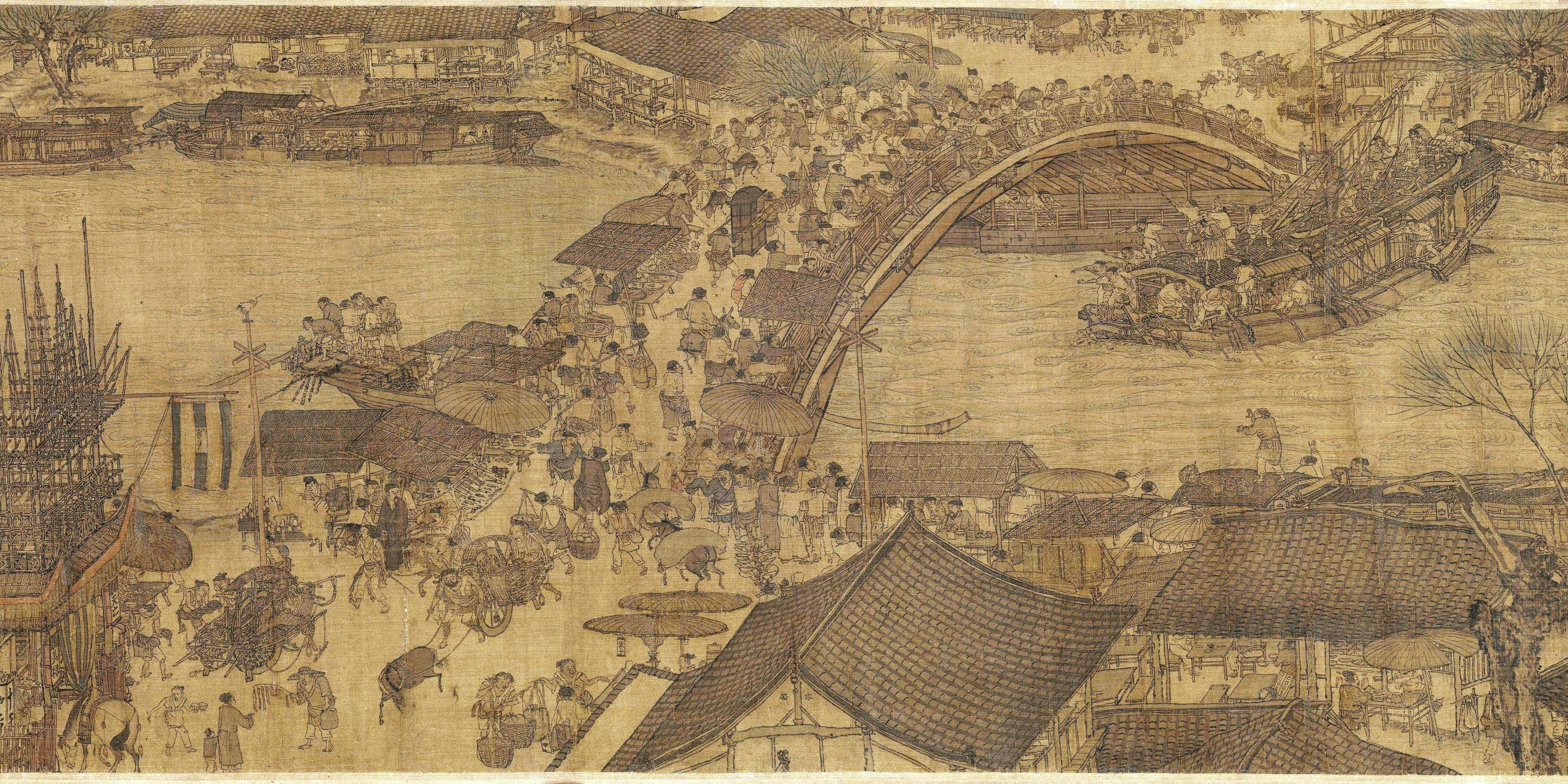
Detail of the original version of Along the River During the Qingming Festival attributed to Zhang Zeduan (1085–1145). Note that the picture switches back and forth between axonometric and perspective projection in different parts of the image.

== Limitations ==
In this drawing, the blue sphere is two units higher than the red one. However, this difference in elevation is not apparent if one covers the right half of the picture.

The Penrose stairs depicts a staircase which seems to ascend (anticlockwise) or descend (clockwise) yet forms a continuous loop.

As with other types of parallel projection, objects drawn with axonometric projection do not appear larger or smaller as they lie closer to or farther away from the viewer. While advantageous for architectural drawings, where measurements must be taken directly from the image, the result is a perceived distortion, since unlike perspective projection, this is not how human vision or photography normally works. It also can easily result in situations where depth and altitude are difficult to gauge, as is shown in the illustration to the right.

This visual ambiguity has been exploited in optical art, as well as "impossible object" drawings. Though not strictly axonometric, M. C. Escher's Waterfall (1961) is a well-known image, in which a channel of water seems to travel unaided along a downward path, only to then paradoxically fall once again as it returns to its source. The water thus appears to disobey the law of conservation of energy.
