= Vantage point =

Vantage point may refer to:

- A position or place that affords a wide or advantageous perspective:
  - Scenic viewpoint, a high place where people can gather to view scenery
  - Camera angle in photography, filmmaking, and other visual arts
  - Perspective (graphical)
- Vantage Point (London), the former Archway Tower, an apartment building in north London
- Vantage Point (film), a 2008 thriller film
- Vantage Point (Deus album), a 2008 rock album
- Vantage Point (Sons of Zion album), a 2018 reggae album
- Vantage Point: Developments in North Korea, a South Korean magazine
- The Vantage Point: Perspectives of the Presidency, 1963-1969, the memoirs of Lyndon B. Johnson

== See also ==
- Perspective (disambiguation)
- Point of view (disambiguation)
- View (disambiguation)
- Viewpoint (disambiguation)
