= POV =

POV, pov, or PoV commonly refers to:

- Point of view (disambiguation)

POV, pov, or PoV may also refer to:

== Science and technology ==
- Persistence of vision, an optical illusion whereby multiple discrete images blend into a single image in the human mind
  - POV-Ray, or Persistence of Vision Ray Tracer, a text-based ray-tracing program
- Pyramid of vision, a 3D computer graphics term describing what the viewer sees

== Media and entertainment ==
- P.O.V. (magazine), a lifestyle magazine targeted at young professional men
- POV (TV series), a PBS television program showing independent, non-fiction films
- POV (album), an album by Utopia (1985)
- "POV" (song), a song by Ariana Grande (2020)
- "P.O.V." (song), a song by Clipse featuring Tyler, the Creator (2025)
- "P.O.V.", a track on the album Radio:Active by McFly (2008)
- "P.O.V.", the seventh track on the album Morning After by Dvsn (2017)
- "POV" (Batman: The Animated Series), an episode in Batman fiction
- PoV, a live concert video album by Peter Gabriel
- People on Vacation, an American rock band starring Jaret Reddick of Bowling for Soup and Ryan Hamilton of Smile Smile
- Point-of-view shot, a technique in motion photography
  - Point-of-view pornography, a subset of gonzo pornography in which a performer also holds the camera

== Other uses ==
- Parliament of Victoria, the state legislature of Victoria, Australia
- Privately owned vehicle, as a U.S. government acronym
- POV, or Persian Old Version, a bible translation into Persian
- POV (surname) (ᐱᐅᕖ), an Inuit surname
- POV switch, a control on some joysticks
- Guinea-Bissau Creole language (ISO 639-3 code: pov)
- Power of Veto (disambiguation)

== See also ==
- POW, or prisoner of war, a military term for a captive of the enemy
