= View model (disambiguation) =

View model may refer to:

- Conceptual view model in data modelling for example:
  - ANSI-SPARC Architecture
- Model–View–Controller, an architectural pattern used in software engineering.
- Model–view–adapter, another architectural pattern used in software engineering
- View model in enterprise architecture for example:
  - 4+1 Architectural View Model

== See also ==
- Modeling perspective
- Point of view (disambiguation)
- Three schema approach
- View (disambiguation)
- Viewpoint (disambiguation)
