= Vantage =

Vantage may refer to:

== Places ==
- Vantage, Saskatchewan, Canada
- Vantage, Washington, United States

== Aircraft ==
- Vantage Airport Group, an airport management company
- VisionAire Vantage, a prototype single-engine jet aircraft built by Scaled Composites
- Superior Air Parts Vantage, an American aircraft engine design
- Vantage Club, a frequent flyer program for Monarch Airlines
- Vantage, a flat-bed, business-class airline seat developed by James Thompson

== Other uses ==
- Aston Martin Vantage, automobiles manufactured by Aston Martin
- Vantage (cigarette), a cigarette brand manufactured by R.J. Reynolds Tobacco Company
- Vantage Guitars, a guitar brand manufactured by Matsumoku
- Vantage Championship, a 1986 golf tournament
- Vantage Magazine, a publication at Crystal Springs Uplands School in Hillsborough, California
- Vantage Specialty Chemicals, a specialty chemicals company
- Vantage, a playable character in the game Apex Legends
- Vantage with Palki Sharma, an Indian prime time television news show hosted by Palki Sharma and broadcast by Firstpost

== See also ==
- Vantage point (disambiguation)
