= VIW =

VIW may refer to:

- Violence in the workplace
- Voices in the Wilderness (organization), a 1995 a campaign to end the US/UN sanctions regime against Iraq
- VIW, a historic radio broadcaster in Australia

== See also ==
- View (disambiguation)
