= Distant viewing =

Distant viewing may refer to:

- Television, derived from mixed Latin and Greek roots, meaning "far sight"
- Remote viewing, non-sensorial information gathering

== See also ==
- Far sight (disambiguation)
