= Hana Tsu-Vachel =

Player character of the Fear Effect series

- Fear Effect character
- Illustration of Hana Tsu-Vachel on the cover of Fear Effect Special (2000) by David Boller
- First appearance: Fear Effect (2000)
- Last appearance: Fear Effect Sedna (2018)
- Created by: John Zuur Platten
- Designed by: John Paik; Joan Igawa

In-universe information
- Occupation: Mercenary
- Significant other: Rain Qin

Hana Tsu-Vachel is a fictional character in the Fear Effect video game series. Created by writer and director John Zuur Platten, she debuted as a playable character and the central protagonist of Fear Effect (2000), and returned in its prequel Fear Effect 2: Retro Helix (2001) and the sequel Fear Effect Sedna (2018). Hana is depicted as a morally ambiguous mercenary who uses firearms, deception and her sexuality to accomplish her objectives.

Platten developed Hana as an antihero who would contrast with Lara Croft, then publisher Eidos Interactive's established female protagonist. Hana and the principal characters of Fear Effect were developed as killers who could function as protagonists because their opponents were more dangerous and morally corrupt. Her overall visual appearance was designed by John Paik and translated into three-dimensional character models by artist Joan Igawa. Critical and academic discussion of Hana has focused on her construction as a femme fatale, her bisexuality and relationship with fellow mercenary Rain Qin, and the sexualised advertising campaign used to promote Retro Helix.

== Concept and design ==
Hana is depicted as being of French and Chinese descent, and fluent in six different languages. Writer and director John Zuur Platten developed Hana while working with Kronos Digital Entertainment founder Stan Liu on the original Fear Effect. Liu proposed a cyberpunk game influenced by Hong Kong and the former Kowloon Walled City, leaving Platten to devise its characters and narrative.

Because Lara Croft was already Eidos Interactive's leading female character, Platten believed that another conventionally heroic woman would face resistance from the publisher. He therefore deliberately created Hana as Lara's opposite: a mercenary antihero who was, in his words, close to being a villain but was placed in conflict with characters and forces worse than herself. Eidos initially expressed concern that Hana could conflict with Lara Croft or appear inconsistent with the publisher's portfolio, but approved the project after seeing concept artwork depicting the characters against the game's futuristic Hong Kong environment. In a 2022 interview, Plantten explained that he wanted Hana and her allies to occupy different shades of moral grey rather than being divided between conventional heroes and villains, and compared this approach to John Wick, a popular media franchise centered around its eponymous antiheroic protagonist.

John Paik created the character's overall visual designs, while Igawa adapted his drawings into models used during gameplay and cinematic sequences. Igawa modified details including Hana's clothing, expressions and facial features when translating Paik's artwork into three dimensions. The characters used relatively simple polygonal models overlaid with flat textures, with Igawa employing a "Lightsource" shader to maintain a consistently shaded, animated appearance. The process was intended to approximate two-dimensional animation despite the original PlayStation's technical limitations.

Hana's willingness to use her sexuality was incorporated into her characterisation. In one sequence from the first game, she drops a towel to distract an armed guard. Platten said that the developers recognised that the scene would be controversial but considered the action consistent with Hana's background and her tendency to use every available means to achieve an objective. Igawa recalled that she may have suggested the implementation of this sequence during development.

Sushee Games stated during the development of Sedna that it would neither conceal Hana and Rain's relationship nor use it principally to promote the game. The developers described the relationship as sincere and sought to provide context for intimate images rather than present them solely for sexual appeal.

== Appearances ==
Hana first appears in Fear Effect, set in a futuristic Hong Kong. She and fellow mercenaries Royce Glas and Jakob "Deke" Decourt search for Wee Ming Lam, the missing daughter of a powerful criminal leader, intending to abduct her and demand a ransom. The mission instead draws them into a conflict involving Chinese mythology and the supernatural. Hana is presented as an experienced operative with connections to organised crime and a willingness to manipulate or kill others when necessary.

Fear Effect 2: Retro Helix is a prequel exploring how Hana, Rain, Glas and Deke became associated with one another. Hana encounters Rain, an intelligent operative whom she finds unconscious and subsequently nurses back to health. Although Hana initially values Rain's technical abilities, their interactions imply an emotional and sexual relationship. Carrie Gouskos of GameSpot wrote that Rain reveals a softer side of the otherwise isolated and hot-tempered Hana.

Hana and Rain return as an established couple in Fear Effect Sedna, which is set four years after the original game. The game follows them and the other returning mercenaries during a mission involving Inuit mythology. Developer Sushee Games retained the relationship while seeking to portray it without reproducing the sexualised marketing associated with Retro Helix.

Hana also appeared in two one-shot comics published by Top Cow Productions through Image Comics. Fear Effect Special was released in May 2000 as a tie-in to the original game. Written by Matt Hawkins and Frank Mastromauro and pencilled by David Boller, it follows Hana, Glas and Deke during another mercenary assignment involving supernatural forces. A second one-shot, Fear Effect: Retro Helix, was released in March 2001. Written by David Wohl and Mastromauro, with pencils by Francis Manapul and inks by John Livesay, it features Hana, Rain, Glas and Deke in a story beginning with Rain fleeing pursuers through the waterways of Hong Kong.

== Promotion and marketing ==
Hana and Rain as depicted in one of the advertisements for Fear Effect 2: Retro Helix.

Hana's sexuality and her relationship with Rain became a major part of the promotion of Retro Helix. Eidos centred much of the game's advertising on suggestive images of Hana and Rain, including an image of the women straddling one another in their underwear. The image had originated within Kronos, but Eidos adopted it as a principal element of the advertising campaign. Liu described Hana as attracted to both men and women and rejected attempts to categorise her exclusively as a lesbian. Liu said that their relationship was not the focus of the story and believed that the advertising and resulting media attention exaggerated its importance. He said that Rain had been introduced partly to create the possibility of a future romantic triangle, although the planned sequel in which this could have been developed was cancelled.

In 2006, Eidos announced that it had optioned the film and television rights to the series to director Uwe Boll and his production company. Boll proposed an action film modelled on Charlie’s Angels that would present Hana and Rain in what he described as a darker and more provocative manner.

== Reception ==
=== Critical reception ===
Hana's characterisation and relationships received favourable attention in contemporary reviews, with critical commentary frequently concentrating on her relationship with Rain. Carrie Gouskos included Hana and Rain in GameSpot's 2006 feature on notable video game relationships. She described Hana as emotionally isolated and argued that Rain brought out a tenderness not otherwise apparent in her interactions. Frank Provo of GameSpot described her as an assassin equally proficient in seduction and combat and considered her relationship with Rain the emotional legacy of Retro Helix. Reviewing Retro Helix at release, Brad Gallaway of GameCritics.com praised its dark and amoral characterisation of Hana, Glas and Deke as hired killers concerned chiefly with completing their mission and ensuring their own survival. He argued that these qualities, rather than the sexual content emphasised by the advertising campaign, gave the game its mature film noir-like tone. In a 2025 retrospective, Aaron Boehm of Bloody Disgusting regarded Hana as the effective central character of the original game because its principal drama increasingly becomes connected to her background. A review by MeriStation of Sedna considered this approach one of the later game's strengths, saying that Hana and Rain remained a couple but were depicted naturally rather than through the excessive titillation of the earlier advertising.

Some of the coverage about Hana was less favourable. David Meikleham of GamesRadar+ was critical of Hana and mocked the possibility that the game's fear mechanic could kill her when her stress became excessive. Gallaway criticised Eidos for marketing the game as lurid entertainment in the manner Hana and Rain were presented, and that its sensationalised advertising misrepresented the game's actual content. Chi Kong Lui also of GameCritics.com further contrasted the advertising of Hana's relationship with the game itself, observing that the campaign implied substantially more sexual content than appeared in the finished work. He identified only the implied encounter preceding Hana's opening assassination and the elevator distraction involving Hana and Rain as significant examples. A 2009 feature in the German magazine M! Games described Hana and Rain as two comparatively short-lived femme fatale protagonists of the PlayStation era. It considered their use of sexuality central to their characterisation, but criticised both Eidos's advertising and the in-game depiction of their relationship as attention-seeking, concluding that the resulting publicity did not translate into lasting popularity.

Patrick Klepek of Kotaku retrospectively described the promotional campaign for Retro Helix as crass and as grossly exaggerating the relationship between the two leads. He contrasted its emphasis on sexual titillation with the relative rarity at the time of both female protagonists and same-sex relationships in video games. Anthony Burch of Destructoid argued that public memory of the series had become dominated by the sensationalised promotion of Hana and Rain for Retro Helix, rather than the original game's ensemble cast and supernatural crime story. Gouskos criticised the gratuitous manner in which the pair were presented but considered their relationship significant because female same-sex relationships remained rare in games and because the characters were given greater emotional depth than the advertising suggested.

Popular-media rankings recognised Hana as a mercenary and action heroine, but frequently concentrated on her appearance, bisexuality and relationship with Rain. UGO, M! Games and Complex variously mentioned her combat abilities, visual design and LGBTQ status while giving substantial attention to the sexualised promotion of Retro Helix.

=== Analysis ===
Media scholars Adrienne Shaw and Elizaveta Friesem identified Hana as one of the comparatively uncommon explicitly LGBTQ playable characters in digital games, while noting that her relationship with Rain is only hinted at within Retro Helix.

Hana was one of eleven playable female characters examined by Jessica E. Tompkins, Teresa Lynch, Irene van Driel and Niki Fritz in a 2020 study published in the Journal of Broadcasting & Electronic Media. The researchers described her as an exemplary femme fatale who uses seduction as a weapon, citing an opening sequence in which she approaches a man in lingerie before the game reveals that she has killed him. They interpreted Hana's portrayal as simultaneously empowering and problematic: her violence, competence and independence give her power, while her sexualised presentation remains oriented toward a presumed male audience. Tompkins and her co-authors observed that Hana commonly occupies the more dominant and conventionally masculine position in her relationship with Rain, while Rain is presented as more submissive and feminine. They nevertheless found that the characters' cooperation and concern for one another balanced independence with emotional dependency. The researchers also described Hana's partnerships with Glas and Deke as relationships among characters of equal strength and skill, interpreting the group as cooperative rather than hierarchically organised.

Carlos Ramírez-Moreno examined Hana in a study of bisexual erasure and stereotyping in video games. He argued that Retro Helix associated her bisexuality with hypersexuality and the male gaze, particularly through advertising that fetishised her relationship with Rain despite leaving it largely implicit within the game. He contrasted this with Sedna, which explicitly presented Hana and Rain as a couple.

== See also ==
- Media portrayals of bisexuality
