= Viewpoint =

Viewpoint may refer to:

- Scenic viewpoint, a location, usually elevated, where people can stop to view scenery

== In computing ==
- Viewpoint model, a computer science technique for making complex systems more comprehensible to human engineers
- Viewpoint Corporation, a digital media company known for its subsidiary Fotomat
  - Viewpoint Media Player, a software product made by Viewpoint Corporation, and the associated file format
- ViewPoint, the operating system of the Xerox Daybreak computer

== In arts and entertainment ==
- Camera angle, in photography, filmmaking, and other visual arts
- Viewpoints, an acting technique based on improvisation

=== Games ===
- Viewpoint (video game), shooter video game
- Viewpoint (card game), dedicated deck card game

=== Television ===
- Viewpoint (Australian TV program), a 2012–2017 Australian current affairs television program broadcast on Sky News Australia
- Viewpoint (British TV series), a 2021 British drama television series
- Viewpoint (Canadian TV program), a 1957–1976 Canadian current affairs television program which aired on CBC
- Viewpoint (Philippine TV program), a 1984–1994 Philippine late night public affairs talk show and television program that was broadcast on GMA network
- Viewpoint (talk show), an American television talk show, mostly hosted by Eliot Spitzer, that aired on Current TV 2012–2013
- Viewpoint, an Indian night-time news TV show broadcast by CNN-News18

== Other uses ==
- View Point, a land form on Antarctica
- ViewPoint, a skyscraper in the American city of Atlanta
- Viewpoint School, a K-12 school in Calabasas, California, US
- Viewpoints Research Institute, a nonprofit organization focused on education, systems research, and personal computing

== See also ==
- Perspective (disambiguation)
- Point of view (disambiguation)
- View (disambiguation)
