= Meat Puppet (video game) =

1997 video game

- Developer: Kronos Digital Entertainment
- Publisher: Playmates Interactive
- Platform: Microsoft Windows
- Release: 17 June 1997
- Genres: Action game, puzzle, platformer, shooter
- Modes: Single player, multiplayer

Meat Puppet is a 1997 video game developed by Kronos and published by Playmates Interactive for Windows. It is an isometric shooter video game in which players, as heroine Lotos Abstraction, must perform high-profile assassinations across a series of levels. Upon release, Meat Puppet received a mixed reception, with critics praising the game's concept and writing, and faulting the game's time limits and controls. Many critics unfavorably compared the game to a similar title, Crusader: No Remorse.

== Gameplay ==
Gameplay screenshot

Meat Puppet is an shooter video game played in isometric perspective across several levels. The objective of each level is to locate and assassinate a target within a time limit; if the player fails to do so, a detonator attached to their body explodes and the level is reset. However, once the mission objectives are completed, players are able to navigate the level before progressing. Players move across levels eight using a mouse mode: pointing with the mouse and dragging, and using point and click controls to shoot a weapon, or a keyboard mode that mixes keyboard and mouse controls. The player uses a weapon to shoot that is capable of firing as a machine gun, rocket launcher and flamethrower, with ammo collected throughout the level to change fire types.

== Plot ==
In a dystopian, post-apocalyptic Los Angeles circa the mid-21st century, after a devastating technogenic catastrophe, society has decayed into corporate rule, environmental ruin, and abject depravity. The player assumes the role of Lotos (or Lotus) Abstraction, a striking yet ruthless female assassin who answers a mysterious personal ad promising "nocturnal missions". Instead, she is ambushed, memory-wiped, implanted with explosive, toxic gel sacks, and coerced into servitude by a shadowy figure known only as the Martinet. Controlled via a "Radio Cranial Link" and monitored by these lethal implants, Lotos is sent on a brutal mandate: eliminate the corrupt ambassadors of six powerful corporate embassies across the ruined city. Failure means sudden, devastating death. Helping her is Dumaine, a digital ghost or cybernetic prisoner, who communicates through her implant. Though still under the Martinet's thumb, he grows increasingly sympathetic and allies with Lotos—both seek to expose and overthrow the Martinet.

Throughout her mission, Lotos gradually uncovers the bleak machinations of both the corporate oligarchs and the Martinet himself. As she progresses, from street-level combat zones to towering skyscrapers, her objectives expand: not only must she kill the embassy ambassadors, but she must also expose the Martinet's identity and find a way to free herself (and Dumaine) from his control without triggering the explosive gel implanted in her body. Amid this grim cyberpunk backdrop, bizarre and surreal challenges confront her—from battling mutated child-assassins and grotesque biomechanical adversaries to pushing a floating sentient brain through industrial levels . Meanwhile, Lotos's suppressed memories slowly resurface, complicated by Dumaine's encrypted guidance and the Martinet's looming influence. Ultimately, the game builds toward a two-fold climax: the assassination of the final ambassador and a confrontation with the Martinet. Lotos must stop him, disable her internal bomb, reclaim her identity—and decide whether to trust Dumaine's promise of mutual salvation or face the cost of freedom alone.

== Development and release ==
Meat Puppet was developed by Kronos Digital Entertainment, a Pasadena, California based company founded in 1992 as an computer graphics animation and effects studio. The game was their first independent project, and second release, following a commission by Vic Tokai to create a PlayStation fighting video game, named Criticom, in 1995. The development team included lead programmer Luigi Warren, lead artist Max Champan, senior programmer Dan Candela, and producer and lead designer David Sears. Sears and Chapman had conceived of a cyberpunk video game whilst working at former employer Virgin Interactive. Sears stated that the original intent for Meat Puppet was to create a dark and serious game, but the resulting bleakness of the game's tone prompted the studio to revise it with a comedic one. The developers contracted fourteen artists in the Silicon Graphics Alias team to create the 3D animations. Sears stated that production was too ambitious as the team was not large enough to fully build all the content desired, too much time was taken to build the engine, and the game was released in a "barely finished" state. Meat Puppet was released on 17 June 1997, and was showcased at E3 1997. In December 1997, a panel of the German Federal Review Board for Media Harmful to Minors indexed Meat Puppet on a register of harmful media on the basis that it was "evidently capable of socially and ethically disorienting children and young people", with copies recalled by distributor Softgold in anticipation of restrictions on its distribution.

== Reception ==
Reception

Review scores
Publication	Score
Computer Games Strategy Plus	1/5
Computer Gaming World	4/5
GamePro	4/5
GameSpot	4.3/10
Hyper	72%
Next Generation	3/5
PC Games (US)	C

Meat Puppet received mixed reviews. Compared to the game Crusader: No Remorse before release, critics were divided on the resemblance with Meat Puppet: some felt the game was distinctive in its own right, whilst others felt it was derivative or failed to surpass the quality of Crusader. Describing Meat Puppet as a Crusader clone, Dan Toose of Hyper stated that the game had "less features and control options" and appealed only "due to the lack of similar titles around today".

Several critics remarked that the humor and writing of Meat Puppet was its most remarkable feature. Describing it as "action-packed [and] darkly funny", Robert Coffey of Computer Gaming World wrote that the game's enemies were "inventive" and the game world featured great attention to detail, although feeling "the creative well runs a little dry later in the game". Similarly, Next Generation praised the game's "off-the-wall character designs" and "twisted" humor, and GamePro its "compelling storyline" and fusion of story, action and atmosphere. Praise went to the characterization and voice acting of Lotos, with some highlighting her voice acting and its deadpan delivery, and Bill Meyer of CNET Game Center enjoying her antihero personality and style. Some compared Lotos' design to Aeon Flux. However, some critics disliked some music, voices and sound effects, either as they were irritating, or repetitive due to the limited repertoires of non-player characters.

Controls were a common complaint from reviewers, with most finding they were unresponsive. Steve Bauman of Computer Games Strategy Plus remarked that the controls were not smooth and lacked simultaneous actions, such as firing whilst running. Whilst finding them functional and not difficult to manage, Next Generation felt they were unresponsive. The game's invisible timer was also identified as an irritation for some, with Bauman writing that it "ruins the game" and discouraged exploration of levels, and Coffey writing that the limits paired poorly with the "sprawl of the game world", meaning that players would skip unnecessary challenges to race against the clock.
