= Dark Rift =

1997 video game

- North American Nintendo 64 box art
- Developer: Kronos Digital Entertainment
- Publisher: Vic Tokai
- Designers: Stan Liu; Albert Co; Matt Arrington; Andy Koo; Ted Wornock; John Paik
- Platforms: Nintendo 64, Windows
- Release: Nintendo 64: NA: July 8, 1997; EU: July 30, 1997; Windows: NA: October 22, 1997
- Genre: Fighting
- Modes: Single-player, multiplayer

Dark Rift is a 1997 fighting video game developed by Kronos Digital Entertainment and published by Vic Tokai for the Nintendo 64 and Microsoft Windows. It is notable for being the first N64 game to run at 60 frames per second.

Though Dark Rift has been referred to as the Nintendo 64's first native fighting game, in actuality it started development as a Sega Saturn game. In addition, it was originally announced that the Windows version of the game would precede the Nintendo 64 version by one month.

== Gameplay ==
Gameplay screenshot

Players choose from eight playable characters to start; there are also two hidden characters which are unlocked by completing the game in single-player mode. Fights go for a default three-out-of-five rounds, as opposed to the more conventional two-out-of-three.

== Plot ==
Dark Rift takes place far in the future, sometime after the events of Criticom. Gameplay spans three dimensions: the Neutral Dimension (where Earth is located), the Dark Dimension (home to demons), and the Light Dimension (home to energy beings). Although the creatures of the Dark Dimension are demonic, there is no indication that the inhabitants of the Light Dimension have any angelic qualities.

The crystal (the acquisition of which is the main motivation of the characters of Criticom) turns out to be the Core Prime Element of a Master Key, one which holds the power to all the secrets in the universe. The Master Key was found eons ago lodged in a spatial tear. When it was retrieved it burst into three pieces, sending two pieces into alternate dimensions, and widening the tear into the game's namesake Dark Rift.

== Development ==
It was originally announced under the title "Criticom II", and is the second of three fighting games developed by Kronos Digital, falling between Criticom and Cardinal Syn. Stan Liu (head and founder of Kronos) said "we got stuck doing fighting games for a while simply because we were one of the very few U.S. game developers that actually made a fighting game. Hence, Dark Rift and Cardinal Syn."

Unlike its predecessor Criticom, motion capture was used to create all the fighter animations in Dark Rift. The animation work was directed by Ted Warnock, whose background was in traditional animation.

The game was localized to Japan under the name Space Dynamites (Note: Space Dynamites (スペースダイナマイツ, Supēsu Dainamaitsu)) on March 27, 1998.

== Reception ==
Reception

Aggregate score
Aggregator	Score
GameRankings	57% (N64)

Review scores
Publication	Score
Edge	5/10 (N64)
Electronic Gaming Monthly	6/10, 4.5/10, 5.5/10, 6.5/10 (N64)
Famitsu	24/40
Game Informer	6.5/10
GameFan	80% (Note: In GameFan's early viewpoint of the Nintendo 64 version, three critics gave it each a score of 78, 80, and 82.)
GameSpot	5/10 (N64)
GameStar	49% (WIN)
Hyper	71%
IGN	5.4/10 (N64)
N64 Magazine	72% (US); 69% (EU)
Next Generation	3/5 (N64)
Nintendo Power	3.725/5 (N64)

Dark Rift received generally mixed reviews. A number of critics deemed it a dramatic improvement over Kronos's previous fighting game, Criticom. Doug Perry of IGN, for example, concluded that "Kronos has overcome its Criticom syndrome: the level of character detail is there, the many chained combos, the feel of the game, the variety of fighters and fighting styles are all good. Dark Rift shines through its weaknesses, and, for the time being, can be called the best fighter on Nintendo 64." The most widely praised aspects were the graphics and animation; Shawn Smith of Electronic Gaming Monthly went so far as to compare it to Virtua Fighter 3 (a game which ran on cutting edge arcade hardware) in this respect. However, he and his three co-reviewers further commented that the game is weak in every other respect, and Jeff Gerstmann of GameSpot said that it "feels like a Virtua Fighter-inspired mishmash of monsters, demons, and guys with guns. The graphic effects are the only things that save Dark Rift from falling below average." By contradiction, Perry and a Next Generation critic both highly praised the character designs, particularly Demonica and Morphix.

The specific criticisms of the game varied. Perry and EGM's Dan Hsu said that the projectiles are slow to the point of being useless. Edge criticized Dark Rift for lacking original features, calling it an average fighting game that "fails to produce a single surprise or elicit one impressive moment of action." GamePro found the combos too difficult to perform, but nonetheless deemed Dark Rift "a fast, fun, polygon-based 3D fighting game that's imaginative with its use of graphics, and may break ground for other poly-fighters like Tekken on the N64." (Note: GamePro gave the Nintendo 64 version 4.5/5 for graphics, 4.0/5 for fun factor, 3.5/5 for control, and 4.0/5 for sound.)
