= Special Assignment =

Special Assignment may refer to:

- SABC Special Assignment, a South African current affairs TV programme
- "Special Assignment" (Captain Scarlet), an episode of the British TV series Captain Scarlet and the Mysterons
- Special Assignment (TV series), a Canadian current affairs TV series
- Special Assignments, a novella collection by Russian author Boris Akunin
