= Meat puppet =

Meat puppet (or puppets) may refer to:

- Meatpuppetry, a form of sockpuppetry where a new user (meatpuppet) is invited to an internet discussion solely to influence it
- Meat Puppets, an American rock band
  - Meat Puppets (album), the band's eponymous debut album, released in 1982
- Meat Puppet (video game), a 1997 video game developed by Kronos Digital Entertainment
