= Everybody Hates the G.E.D. =

- Everybody Hates Chris episode
- Episode no.: Season 4 Episode 22
- Written by: Don Reo
- Teleplay by: Adam Lorenzo
- Narrated by: Chris Rock
- Original release date: May 8, 2009

"Everybody Hates the G.E.D." is the twenty-second and final episode of the fourth season of the American television series Everybody Hates Chris, which aired on May 8, 2009 on The CW channel.

== Story ==
After facing academic difficulties and failing due to tardiness, Chris is referred to take the General Educational Development (GED) exam to graduate from high school. Faced with this situation, he decides to drop out of school and look for a job.

== Production ==
The episode was written by Don Reo and narrated by Chris Rock; this chapter also marked the end of production due to low ratings and a lack of continuity.

The ending presented an open-ended approach, concluding the narrative before the results of Chris's test were revealed. The final scene, showing a family gathering of Chris at a restaurant, ended before the test results were shown.

Because the series was inspired by Chris Rock's teenage experiences, the ending did not directly address certain later events in the comedian's real life, including the death of his father, maintaining the focus on the humorous tone of the production.

== Reception ==
The series finale sparked discussions among viewers regarding the fate of Chris and the other members of his family. One of the questions concerned the character Julius Rock, whose real-life death led some viewers to speculate about the possibility of the character having a similar fate after the events of the series.

Another point of discussion was the result of the GED exam taken by Chris, which is not revealed in the episode, raising questions about the protagonist's future.
