= Fear Effect 2: Retro Helix =

2001 video game

- Developer: Kronos Digital Entertainment
- Publisher: Eidos Interactive
- Director: Stanley Liu
- Designers: Scott J. Compton; Tim Coolidge
- Programmers: Michael Fernie; Steve Shimizu
- Artist: Stanley Liu
- Writer: Stanley Liu
- Composer: David Rovin
- Platform: PlayStation
- Release: NA: February 21, 2001; EU: March 23, 2001; JP: November 15, 2001
- Genre: Action-adventure
- Mode: Single-player

Fear Effect 2: Retro Helix is a 2001 action-adventure video game developed by Kronos Digital Entertainment and published by Eidos Interactive for the PlayStation. The game serves as a prequel to Fear Effect (2000).

== Plot ==
Fear Effect 2: Retro Helix begins in Hong Kong in the year 2048. The player delves into the colorful histories of the original cast of three mercenaries and newcomer Rain Qin, as well as the extraordinary circumstances that brought them together. In the wake of a degenerative global pandemic called EINDS (Environmentally Induced Nucleotides Degeneration Syndrome – pronounced "ends"), theft, murder, and terrorism have become big business.

Hana Tsu-Vachel and Rain Qin are freelance operatives, Royce Glas is a washed-up former soldier, and Jacob "Deke" Decourt is a cutthroat assassin. Much of the game's intrigue lies in how these unlikely allies even manage to come together for one cause. From the start, each of them have their own motives, but they soon all become entangled in a sinister plot extending far beyond politics, espionage, or personal survival. The adventure takes players through a futuristic Hong Kong, the formidable walled city of Xi'an, the lost tomb of the first emperor of China, and, finally, into the mountain island of the immortals, Penglai Shan.

== Gameplay ==
Like the original Fear Effect, the sequel features cel-shaded character models on top of pseudo-3D environments that use looping full-motion video to give the appearance of constantly animated background elements. Players take control of each of the four main characters (Hana, Rain, Deke and Glas) at different times throughout the game, which enables multilateral perspective on the storyline.

Retro Helix mostly relies on a third-person perspective. The controls are mapped without regard to the character's current position or direction faced. Unlike the original Fear Effect, however, Retro Helix offers players the option of a more traditional control scheme. At the player's disposal is a small arsenal of weapons, including a variety of firearms – including pistols, shotguns, and assault rifles, specialty equipment such as a hand-held EMPs and a taser, and one unique melee weapon for each character.

Fear Effect 2 is primarily focused on solving puzzles to progress rather than combating enemies. In spite of the heavy ordnance available, enemies are few and far between, with static – as opposed to dynamic – placement. The gameplay is intended to evoke tension and suspense, rather than relying on the nonstop action formula of standard shooters. This format has the consequence of making the gameplay arguably less difficult, although it is offset by the relative ease at which characters can die from enemy attacks and a number of instant-death scenarios. The fear gauge present in the original game returns for Retro Helix, a variation on the health meter common to most action games.

== Reception ==
Reception

Aggregate scores
Aggregator	Score
GameRankings	82%
Metacritic	84/100

Review scores
Publication	Score
AllGame	3.5/5
Edge	6/10
Electronic Gaming Monthly	8.5/10 (Note: Two critics of Electronic Gaming Monthly gave the game each a score of 9/10, and the other gave it 7.5/10.)
EP Daily	7.5/10
Eurogamer	5/10
Famitsu	27/40
Game Informer	8.5/10
GameRevolution	B
GameSpot	8.9/10
GameZone	9.5/10
IGN	6.9/10
Next Generation	5/5
Official U.S. PlayStation Magazine	4.5/5
X-Play	4/5
Maxim	2/5

Fear Effect 2: Retro Helix received "favorable" reviews according to the review aggregation website Metacritic. Jeff Lundrigan of NextGen said of the game, "Everyone who's mature enough to appreciate it and [who] owns a PlayStation should buy this. You will not be disappointed. Now, sequel please!" (Ironically, the sequel was later cancelled, as described in the following section.) In Japan, where the game was ported for release under the name Helix: Fear Effect (ヘリックス フィアエフェクト, Herikkusu Fia Efekuto) on November 15, 2001, Famitsu gave it a score of 27 out of 40. Michael "Major Mike" Weigand of GamePro said, "Although it's marred by minor flaws, Retro Helix receives high marks for its engrossing story and brilliant technical aspects. The new gaming year gets off to a flying start with Fear Effect 2, a must-have title that will keep gamers glued to their seats for days." (Note: GamePro gave the game two 5/5 scores for graphics and sound, 4/5 for control, and 4.5/5 for fun factor.)

The game sold 10,000–15,000 projected units in its first month in the U.S., according to the NPD TRSTS Videogame Service.

The game was nominated for the "Best PlayStation Game" award at GameSpot's Best and Worst of 2001 Awards, which went to Tony Hawk's Pro Skater 3.

== Cancelled sequel ==
An unreleased third game entitled Fear Effect Inferno was originally announced for the PlayStation 2 as a sequel to the first game Fear Effect with Kronos Digital Entertainment developing it and Eidos Interactive publishing it at the time. The first trailer was released during E3 2002. It depicted some of the only known footage of the game.

While story details have been scarce, IGN editors promised that "the fusion [of] Asian myth and freaky modern themes" would be prominent like the previous two titles. Through the few demonstration clips that Kronos released during the game's development, fans have pieced together a portion of the game's plot.

Fear Effect Inferno is based on the best ending the player could achieve in the first game Fear Effect. Therefore, the demons set forth by Jin have been killed, Glas' arm has been "reattached," and Deke's body and soul have been restored. According to the videos, Fear Effect Inferno's story chronicled Hana's capture by a group of demons disguised as human doctors and nurses. Hana is placed in an asylum where tests are performed on her. During this time, she has several hallucinations, which range from Hana's completion of ancient tasks to her friends, including Hana herself, getting slaughtered by beasts. As she completed more challenges, Hana gained power from these ancient beings, allowing her to escape the grasp of the asylum's demons and experiments. Meanwhile, Deke is working from the inside, possibly as a "patient," killing any and all individuals that get in his way while searching for Hana. By the end of the journey, the four bounty hunters would once again face the fires of Hell, and fight the remaining demons Besides the demons themselves, their previously-human experiments, henchmen with sunglasses, and a woman that vaguely resembles Wee Ming, no "main enemy" was ever highlighted. However, Fear Effect Inferno promised more characterization during the course of the adventure.

Many drastic changes to the characters were expected to take place during the events of Fear Effect Inferno. As the trailers and demonstration clips explained, Glas and Rain would begin a sexual relationship. At the same time, Hana and Glas would develop closer bonds, which would have created a love triangle for the three bounty hunters. The fates of the characters themselves are unknown; it was never revealed if any of the deaths witnessed by Hana or the player would be permanent.

Only a few screenshots exist that hint at the gameplay style of Inferno. Based on these images, it was concluded that the gameplay would have been nearly identical to the previous two games. However, a new weapon system would have allowed players to map a firearm to the "X" (Cross) button and another to the "O" (Circle) button on the DualShock 2 controller. This would have allowed numerous weapon combinations. In addition, updated diving moves could be executed to quickly evade enemy fire. The environment itself would have allowed players to hide from hazards, such as bullets, and function as a way to avoid detection. It was rumored that players could control certain actions during scripted in-game fight scenes, requiring the player to execute timed button combinations to fight certain opponents. Inferno would have introduced the separation of the "Health" and "Fear" Meters. However, it is not known how the "Fear" Meter would have affected gameplay since it functioned as both in the previous two titles.

Graphically, Inferno would have resembled the previous two titles with a "next-gen facelift." Using the PlayStation 2's graphical capabilities, pre-rendered scenes, which would have shown the characters talking and performing more animation-intensive actions, would have been rendered at a higher resolution. Like the previous two games, the background environments would have been short, pre-rendered animations, using a technique utilized by some portions of Final Fantasy X. The polygonal characters would have been rendered using a cel-shaded method similar to the ones used in the previous two Fear Effect titles for the PlayStation. Other gimmicks, such as Hana frequently changing clothes, would have been prominent in the game, as well; in the existing clips alone, Hana dons no fewer than 4 different outfits.

The game's status changed rapidly towards the end of 2002 and was finally cancelled in 2003. However, between the announcement and the cancellation, information was scarce.

News of the cancellation did not come to fans until 2004, years after the game's initial announcement and quiet absence. Even Sandy Abe, the CFO of Kronos at the time, hinted that Eidos might give the series a second chance under a new developer, such as Crystal Dynamics, but this was only true for the Tomb Raider franchise. However Abe later stated in an email, "Unfortunately Fear Effect probably will not get picked up."

Reports varied as to the status of the game between 2002 and 2003. While an early report by GameSpot in May 2003 described the game as simply "on hold", IGN broke the news during their "Missing in Action" series of articles that the game had been cancelled. According to IGN's report, the game "was the first of Eidos' victims to its more stringent quality assurance program." Due to the game's delayed progress, it was either given more development time or cancelled. Unfortunately, only the development staff knew of the game's status following this condemnation but according to the fans the content was big and still enough to publish. According to IGN, "at some point in late 2002 or early 2003, Kronos did indeed shop it to various publishers. Nobody, however, bit."

== Revival ==
In February 2015, Square Enix announced that it would allow developers to create games based on some of their old Eidos IPs via the Square Enix Collective project, including the Fear Effect IP.

In April 2016, a new entry in the series titled Fear Effect Sedna was announced. It was released in 2018 to mostly negative reviews.
