= Magic: The Gathering deck types =

Game play concepts for Magic: The Gathering

Gameplay of the collectible card game Magic: The Gathering is fueled by each player's deck of cards, which constitute the resources that player can call upon to battle their opponents in any given game. With more than 20,000 unique cards in the game, a considerable number of different decks can be constructed. Each card is designed to have certain strengths (and sometimes weaknesses) and therefore a significant part of the game is determined by which cards a player chooses to include in their deck. Broadly speaking, decks can be loosely classified based on their play style and mode of victory. The game's designers often explicitly create cards which are intended to fuel one or more of these given archetypes, in order to create competitive balance and diversity.

While the deck types listed below are specific to Magic: The Gathering, these concepts also extend to other collectible card games.

== Deck archetypes ==
Most classifications of decks begin from one of four major strategies: aggro, control, combo and midrange.

=== Aggro ===
Aggro (short for "aggressive") decks attempt to reduce their opponents from 20 life to 0 life as quickly as possible, rather than emphasize a long-term game plan. Aggro decks focus on converting their cards into damage; they prefer to engage in a race for tempo rather than a card advantage-based attrition war. Aggro generally relies upon creatures as its accumulative source of damage. Aggro decks can quickly overwhelm unprepared opponents and proceed to eke out the last bit of damage they need to end the game. Aggro decks also generally have access to disruptive elements, which can inhibit the opponent's attempts to respond.

- Example cards: Savannah Lions, Bitterblossom, Lightning Bolt, Rogue Elephant, Incinerate
- Example decks:
  - White Weenie, which uses small, efficient creatures such as Savannah Lions, Icatian Javelineers, and Mother of Runes
  - Affinity, which uses the affinity mechanic and large numbers of artifacts to quickly play spells such as Thoughtcast and Frogmite, while efficiently dealing damage using Disciple of the Vault and Arcbound Ravager.
  - Zoo, which uses low-cost, high power creatures such as Tarmogoyf and Wild Nacatl to kill the opponent quickly.
  - Sligh, which utilizes its mana as efficiently as possible to kill the opponent quickly, using low-cost cards such as Jackal Pup and Lightning Bolt.
  - Suicide Black, which uses efficient but dangerous cards that cost life such as Thoughtseize, Dark Confidant, Grim Tutor, and Bitterblossom. Suicide Black epitomizes Black's philosophy—win at all costs—and treats even its life total as an expendable resource.

=== Control ===
Control decks avoid racing. They attempt to slow the game down by executing an attrition plan. As the game progresses, control decks are able to take advantage of their slower, more powerful, cards. The primary strength of control decks is their ability to devalue the opponent's cards. They do this in four ways:

1. Answering threats at a reduced cost. Given the opportunity, Control decks can gain card advantage by answering multiple threats with one spell ("clearing"/"wiping" the board), stopping expensive threats with cheaper spells, and drawing multiple cards or forcing the opponent to discard multiple cards with one spell.
2. Not playing threats to be answered. By playing few proactive spells of their own, control decks gain virtual card advantage by reducing the usefulness of opposing removal cards.
3. Disrupting synergies. Even if control decks do not deal with every threat directly, they can leave out whichever ones stand poorly on their own; e.g., an enchantment which gives a bonus to creatures will never need attention if all enemy creatures are quickly neutralized.
4. Dragging the game out past opposing preparations. An opponent's faster, efficient cards will become less effective over time.
- Example cards: Force of Will, Duress, Wrath of God, Pernicious Deed, Void
- Example decks:
  - Tezzeret Control, which controls the game using counterspells such as Mana Drain, builds card advantage with cards such as Dark Confidant, and ends the game using Tezzeret the Seeker to find Time Vault and activate it for infinite turns.
  - Mono Blue Control, which uses a heavy suite of counterspells alongside card-drawing such as Thirst for Knowledge, removal such as Echoing Truth, and a win condition such as Tezzeret the Seeker. This class of deck is nicknamed "Draw-Go," because most of its players' spells are instants designed to be played during his or her opponents' turns.
  - Blue-White Control, which is similar to Mono-Blue Control, but features more board-control cards such as Wrath of God, and Pacifism.
  - Psychatog, supplemented by card-drawing like Fact or Fiction and a number of disruptive spells.
  - Astral Slide, which uses large numbers of cards with cycling, including those with added benefits such as Eternal Dragon and Slice and Dice, to power Astral Slide and Lightning Rift.
  - Mono-Black Control, which uses removal spells such as Innocent Blood and Barter in Blood to control the board, and Cabal Coffers to kill the opponent with spells such as Consume Spirit. It can also use cards like Underworld Dreams to put the opponent on a timer.
  - The Deck, which uses card drawing such as Fact or Fiction and deck searching cards such as Demonic Tutor to find powerful cards that are highly effective against particular strategies (such as The Abyss, Diabolic Edict, and Balance), alongside a Blue base of counterspells to control the game and obtain an insurmountable lead.

=== Combo ===
Combo decks use the interaction of two or more cards (a "combination") to create a powerful effect that either wins the game immediately or produces an overwhelming advantage. Combo decks value consistency, speed, and resilience: the deck should be reliable enough to produce the combo on a regular basis, the deck should be able to use the combo fast enough to win before the opponent, and the deck should be able to withstand disruption and still win.

Many decks have smaller, combo-like interactions between their cards, which is better described as synergy.

- Example cards: Flash, Tendrils of Agony, Empty the Warrens, Aluren, Painter's Servant.
- Example decks:
  - The Perfect Storm, which utilizes Dark Ritual and artifact mana to draw cards and fuel a lethal Tendrils of Agony, all the while disrupting the opponent with Duress and Force of Will.
  - Painter Combo, which uses Painter's Servant and chooses Blue to permit Red Elemental Blast to destroy any permanent or counter any spell, while also allowing Grindstone to put the opponent's entire library into their graveyard.
  - Worldgorger Dragon Combo, which revolves around the infinite loop triggered when Worldgorger Dragon is animated from the graveyard using an enchantment such as Animate Dead. The loop generates mana and card drawing which is then used to end the game.
  - Belcher Combo, which uses free and efficient mana acceleration to play and activate Goblin Charbelcher, preferably on the first turn. Because the deck has two or fewer lands, one activation of Goblin Charbelcher will almost always kill the opponent.
  - Hulk-Flash, which is dedicated to casting Flash and putting a Protean Hulk into play and then into the graveyard, allowing the player to find a combination of creatures which will kill the opponent instantly. Summoner's Pact and Merchant Scroll are used to find the combo pieces, while Force of Will and Pact of Negation protect the combo.
  - Steel City Vault, which uses "Draw 7" spells such as Timetwister to rapidly assemble the Time Vault-Voltaic Key combo for infinite turns. The deck also uses several cards such as Force of Will and Ancient Grudge to efficiently deal with Null Rod, the most effective answer to the Vault-Key combo.
  - Hexmage Depths, which uses Vampire Hexmage to inexpensively remove the counters from Dark Depths and put a flying, indestructible 20/20 creature token into play as early as the first turn.

=== Midrange ===
A typical midrange deck has an early game plan of mana ramp and control, but begins to play threats once it reaches four to six mana. A midrange deck will often seek to play a reactive, attrition-based game against aggro decks and a more proactive, tempo-based game against control decks. Colloquially, this is referred to as "going bigger" than aggro and "getting in under" control.

- Example cards: Huntmaster of the Fells Thragtusk, Sakura-Tribe Elder
- Example decks:
  - Jund Midrange (BRG), a powerful and flexible deck with virtually zero bad matchups thanks to the access of the most powerful cards that each color can offer: black gives Liliana of the Veil and powerful discard cards like Thoughtseize and Inquisition of Kozilek, red a reliable removal in Lightning Bolt and the green some of the best creatures like Tarmogoyf and Scavenging Ooze.
  - Abzan Midrange (WBG), which is similar to Jund, but trades speed for powerful white based cards like Path to Exile, Lingering Souls and Siege Rhino.
  - Jeskai Midrange (UWR), which has more control elements, using Sphinx's Revelation to draw into a very large number of cards and Assemble the Legion to end up swarming the board with tokens.
  - Temur Emerge (GUR), which leverages the Emerge mechanic introduced in Eldritch Moon to efficiently use ramp creatures such as Pilgrim's Eye and Primal Druid for their land-smoothing abilities while sacrificing them to Emerge board-stalling threats such as Elder Deep-Fiend as early as turn 4, also filling the graveyard to make Emrakul, the Promised End playable on turn 7.
  - Tron, which tries to build the triplet of lands known as "Urzatron" (Urza's Tower, Urza's Mine and Urza's Power Plant) as quickly as possible and then uses the massive amount of mana to play powerful cards like Karn Liberated and Wurmcoil Engine as early as turn 3.

== Hybrid strategies ==
=== Aggro-Control ===
Aggro-control is a hybrid archetype that contains both aggressive creatures and control elements. These decks attempt to deploy quick threats while protecting them with light permission and disruption long enough to win. These are frequently referred to as "tempo" strategies, as they are built with a sense of timing. Tempo players look to control the game early and take advantage of a strong board state. Where purely control decks look to out class players with more quality in the later stages of the game, tempo looks to keep opponents off balance from the very start.

- Example cards: Aven Mindcensor, Ninja of the Deep Hours, Dark Confidant, Magus of the Moon, Ohran Viper
- Example decks:
  - Blue-Green Madness, which uses cards like Wild Mongrel, Careful Study and Circular Logic.
  - Naya Lightsaber, which uses powerful creatures like Ranger of Eos and removal like Ajani Vengeant, many of which also provide card advantage.
  - RUG Delver, which uses cards like Tarmogoyf, Daze and Brainstorm.
  - Fish, which uses mana denial such as Wasteland and Null Rod, alongside disruption such as Daze, Force of Will, and Thoughtseize, to keep the opponent off-balance long enough that creatures such as Tarmogoyf and Dark Confidant win the game.
  - Bob/Gush, which draws enough cards using Dark Confidant ("Bob") and Gush to overwhelm the opponent with attacking creatures and disruption such as Force of Will and Spell Pierce.
  - Delver, which uses the efficient threat Delver of Secrets alongside disruption such as Mana Leak and Vapor Snag.

=== Control-Combo ===
Control-Combo is a control deck with a combo finisher that it can spring quickly if need be. A notable subtype of Control-Combo is "prison," which institutes control through resource denial (usually via a combo).

- Example cards: Orim's Chant, Mana Drain, Goblin Welder, Oath of Druids, Smokestack
- Example decks:
  - Stax, a prison deck which uses Smokestack to destroy opposing permanents, Crucible of Worlds to replay permanents to feed the Smokestack, and Sphere of Resistance and Tangle Wire to tie up an opponent's mana and prevent them from ever playing spells.
  - Stasis, which uses Stasis and cards such as Forsaken City or Boomerang.
  - Scepter-Chant, which uses Isochron Scepter and Orim's Chant.
  - Trix, which gains life using Illusions of Grandeur and then uses Donate to leave the opponent with the often deadly drawback.
  - Oath, uses Oath of Druids and Forbidden Orchard to quickly put a large creature such as Tidespout Tyrant or Hellkite Overlord into play.
  - Control Slaver, which accelerates powerful, high casting cost artifacts such as Mindslaver into play using Goblin Welder, Tinker, or Mana Drain.
  - Drain Tendrils, which controls the game using Mana Drain, Force of Will, and Duress while drawing cards with the Intuition + Accumulated Knowledge engine to set up a lethal Tendrils of Agony.

=== Aggro-Combo ===
Aggro-combo decks employ aggressive creature strategies along with some combination of cards that can win in "combo" fashion with one big turn. For instance, Ravager Affinity decks that include Disciple of the Vault can win by attacking with creatures and also with a combo finish of sacrificing multiple artifacts to Arcbound Ravager and killing the opponent with Disciple triggers.

- Example cards: Berserk, Food Chain, Hatred
- Example decks:
  - Fling Affinity, which uses Arcbound Ravager or Atog and Fling along with Disciple of the Vault.
  - Food Chain Goblins, which uses Food Chain, and Goblin Recruiter and Goblin Ringleader.
  - Fires, which uses Fires of Yavimaya with Saproling Burst and Blastoderm.
  - Dredge, which uses Bazaar of Baghdad and cards with the dredge mechanic (such as Golgari Grave-Troll and Stinkweed Imp) to fill the player's own graveyard. This enables free creatures such as Bloodghast and Narcomoeba, which can generate a large number of zombie tokens in conjunction with Cabal Therapy and Bridge from Below .

=== Aggro-Control-Combo ===
Aggro-control-combo decks combine efficient, creature-based damage, heavy disruption elements, and an ability to unleash an extremely powerful synergy that can end the game in "combo" fashion.

- Example cards: Tinker, Survival of the Fittest, Cunning Wish, Necropotence
- Example decks:
  - Gro-A-Tog, which generally wins by playing Quirion Dryad and protecting it with disruption such as Force of Will and Duress as it "grows," but can also win by playing Fastbond and chaining together Gush and Merchant Scroll to draw many cards and instantly make Quirion Dryad lethal.
  - Tarmo-Twin, plays efficient hard-to-kill threats such as Tarmogoyf with backup from cheap counterspells like Remand and Spell Snare to apply pressure. If the opponent manages to deal with these cards, they are usually left vulnerable to the Deceiver Exarch/Pestermite and Splinter Twin/Kiki-Jiki, Mirror Breaker combo which creates infinite creatures with haste to win the game. The deck can also control the game with Lightning Bolt, Snapcaster Mage, Dig Through Time and Cryptic Command in order to put itself in a position where it can play the Deceiver Exarch/Splinter Twin combo with counterspells as protection or keep a Tarmogoyf in play until it can kill the opponent.

== In-depth Archetype Breakdown ==
Other than the traditional outlook grouping the decks into general buckets (aggro, control, midrange, combo), there are 2 modern outlooks breaking deck archetypes that are meant to more accurately describe how decks actually exploit different aspects of the game into winning conditions.

=== Aspect Analysis ===
Aspect analysis assigns very specific traits to 3 of the buckets and lists everything else as a combination of those; the 3 main buckets being aggro, control, and combo. Combinations, and their inverse combinations, may vary in the way they implement strategies and aspects, therefore are generally not grouped in the same category; a great example of this being control-aggro (aka midrange) vs aggro-control (tempo). From these buckets, different strategies are drawn depending on the type of actual implementation of the deck in question. However, the vast majority of MTG decks use one or a combination of the following aspects to win.

- Linear - Executes own gameplan without necessary interaction with an opponent.
- Non-Linear - Executes strategies according to opponents play with a high amount of interaction.
- Fair - Transfers card advantage into board state, pressure and tempo. All cards have a potential of trading 1 for 1 (e.g. fair trading).
- Unfair - Does not transfer card advantage into board state, and do not cause pressure or create tempo. Mostly improvises its own gameplan using utility cards and trying to trade in their favor.
- Early Game - Provides pressure against an opponent, and sets a clock. Benefits from playing their cards fast before an opponent has a chance to stabilize and execute their gameplan.
- Late Game - Attempts to survive to the late game to play powerful cards and synergies for maximum value.

The graphic listed in this section explains how the traditional archetypes use these different aspects of MTG.

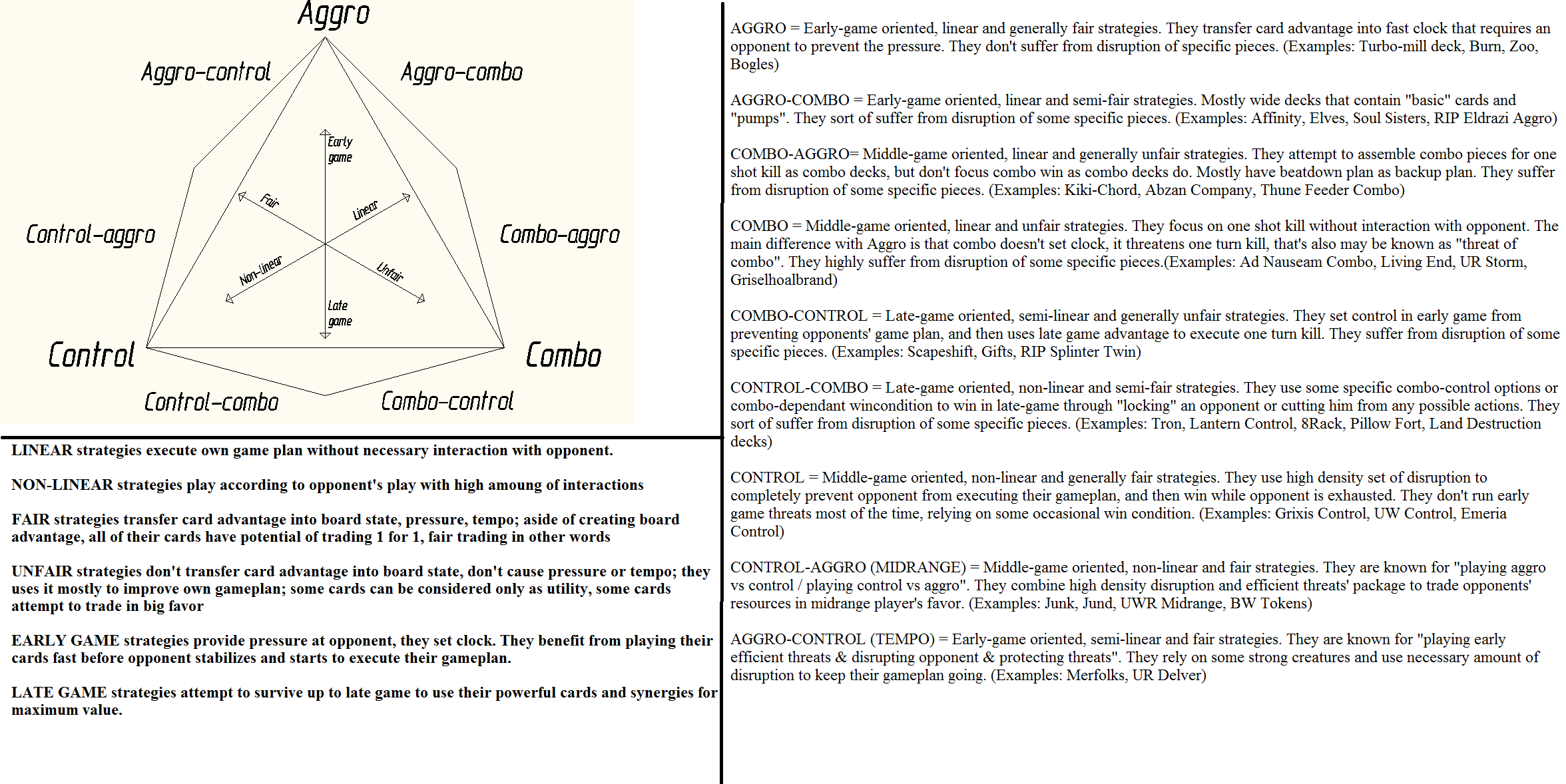
Description of different types of Magic The Gathering deck archetypes

=== Axes analysis ===
The strategic axes analysis groups the different types of decks (aggro, control, combo, aggro-control, control-aggro aka midrange, prison, gimmick, meta) into combinations of the axes listed below. Some of these may overlap with Aspect Analysis.

- Threats vs Answers - A Threat is a card that can win the game if left unchecked, sometimes it includes the idea of smaller threats that combine to form a bigger threat. An Answer is a card that deals with or removes a threat. There are no wrong threats, only wrong answers.
- Tempo Vs Inevitability - Does your deck have to win fast, or does it have to survive the game long enough to stabilize and close out?
- Redundant vs Essential - Does your deck have a lot of cards that basically do the same thing, or does it rely on a few important key pieces to function?

The traditional archetypes fit into the axes in the following manner:

- Aggro: Threats, Tempo, Redundant - Every card is a threat, and every threat does the same thing: deal damage. Aggro decks try to beat out the opponent before they can fight back, and generally, have very little late-game if the opponent is able to stabilize.
- Control: Answers, Inevitable, Redundant - Control tries to have a lot of cards that take away opposing threats in the form of Bounces, Spot Removal, Board Wipes, and Counterspells. Control tries to survive the early game until it can establish its own threat, which is used to close out the late game.
- Combo: Threats, Inevitable, Essential - Each combo piece is not a threat in and of itself, but there is a high degree of inevitability to a deck that can flat-out win the game if it gets all the pieces together. Not as much redundancy as an aggro deck due to each combo piece being essential with few-to-no possible replacements.
- Aggro-Control: Answers, Tempo, Redundant - The flip side of Aggro that trades threats for answers. Tempo decks try to answer as much as they can but are only able to hold off the opponent for just long enough to finish them off.
- Control-Aggro/Midrange: Threats, Inevitable, Redundant - The flip side of Control deck that trades answers for threats. Each threat in a midrange deck is usually a big bomby problematic card. Eventually, you'll draw into enough of them to overwhelm the opponent.
- Prison: Answers, Inevitable, Essential - The flip side to Combo that trades threats for answers. Instead of establishing an "instant win" condition, Prison decks establish an "inevitable never lose" condition by preventing attacks, or damage, or resource generation.
- Gimmick: Threats, Tempo, Essential - A gimmick deck burns all of its resources trying to force a specific interaction, but the interaction is not one that guarantees a win. A gimmick deck is a lot like a combo deck; capable of extremely strong and explosive plays when all the gears mesh, but either the window for capitalizing on these kinds of plays is extremely small, or the interaction is so vulnerable to disruption that the deck completely falls apart without it.
- Meta: Answers, Tempo, Essential - A meta deck is designed to shut down whatever dominant deck is ruling at the moment, at the cost of all other matchups. Usually, this is what your deck turns into when you're desperately side-boarding against an otherwise un-winnable matchup.

== Recent (2012) design philosophy ==
Traditionally, Aggro was seen as advantaged over Control, Control advantaged over Combo, and Combo advantaged over Aggro. Wizards of the Coast has sought to make high casting-cost spells more powerful than in the early days of Magic, and have also wanted to play up creature combat more - an aggressive deck should have to worry about blocking and opposing creatures even from Control and Combo decks. To that end, R&D member Zac Hill described an ideal metagame structured such that:

- "Midrange" is advantaged over "Aggro"
- "Aggro" is advantaged over "Control" and "Disruptive Aggro"
- "Control" and "Disruptive Aggro" are advantaged over "Ramp" and "Combo"
- "Ramp" and "Combo" are advantaged over "Midrange"

Each of these 4 categories would ideally occupy around 25% of a given metagame. In Hill's definition, Aggro refers most specifically to the fastest creature decks built to punish slow starts, ponderous Control decks, and aggressive decks who've substituted out damage for disruption. Midrange decks in this definition are slower creature-based decks who trump the speed of fast aggro with better quality from their somewhat more expensive spells. (Both of these would likely be considered "Aggro" in the traditional definition.) "Ramp" and "Combo" are conceptually similar as noted above; while the combo deck might seek to set up a combination of 2 or 3 cards for a powerful, game-changing effect, the ramp deck instead focuses on building mana as fast as possible and then casting game-changing yet expensive spells, or taking advantage of certain interactions that require a large manabase. A midrange deck often doesn't have the sheer speed to stop ramp or combo from either casting a huge spell or "going off" with the combo. Control decks can counter or otherwise answer the single big threat ramp decks and combo decks provide while winning the long game. Similarly, "disruptive aggro" (equivalent to Aggro-Control in the classic archetypes above) can also stop the single threat Combo and Ramp offer while focusing on winning faster. These rules can change however as blocks cycle and meta shifts.
