= Viewpoint (card game) =

- Designers: Sean Carroll
- Illustrators: Anthony Condos
- Publishers: 93 Made Games
- Players: 2 to 6, more with additional decks
- Playing time: Usually between 10 and 20 minutes
- Chance: Small (mainly with order of cards drawn)
- Age range: 7 and up
- Skills: Strategy; Bluffing; Arithmetic; Reading

Viewpoint is a card game played with a series of specially printed decks. The theme, including card title and image, of each card in the deck is based on an aspect or play on words related to vision, such as "Spectacles", "Eye Spy" or "Blind Freddie". The game was designed by Sean Carroll and its premiere edition was released by Australian game publishers 93 Made Games at the Gen Con Oz gaming convention in September 2009. The first Viewpoint expansion set, Viewpoint Reflections, expands on a storyline introduced in the Viewpoint Hustle animation, which is based on a group of characters, with eyes for heads, who travel to different dimensions by jumping through specially-programmed television sets.

== Official Rules ==
The basic Viewpoint deck consists of 70 cards from the premiere edition but may be expanded or modified by removing cards or adding cards from expansion sets and special releases.

Each card includes rules text and a number. The rules text states what actions to perform when the card is played. Standard actions include drawing cards, discarding cards, playing additional cards, taking extra turns, making other players miss turns, taking cards from another player's hand and moving played cards to the discard pile. The number, which is situated in the top-left-hand corner of the card, is known as that card's View-points. View-points range from -15 to 20 in increments of 5 and only count towards a player's total when a card is on the table.

During play, cards are considered to be in one of 4 zones - Draw Pile (from which cards are drawn), Discard Pile (where discarded or cancelled cards are placed), Hand (where cards are placed when drawn and where cards are played from) and Field of View (where cards are played into). Each player has their own Field of View and Hand, whilst the Draw Pile and Discard Pile are shared.

The objective of the game is to be the first player with a total of 100 or more View-points in their Field of View at the end of their turn.

Each player starts the game with 5 cards dealt from the Draw Pile. Starting with the player to the left of the dealer and continuing clock-wise around the table, players take turns until one player has achieved the objective.

A standard turn is divided into four steps - Draw one card, Play one card, Perform actions, and End the turn. Some cards contradict the standard turn process by allowing players to draw or play extra cards during their turn. When a card contradicts a basic rule, the rule on the card is considered correct.

The game ends when one player has accumulated 100 or more View-points, or the Draw Pile and all players' Hands are empty. The Draw Pile does not get automatically replenished after it runs out of cards.

== Symbols and Keywords ==
Most cards include symbols and keywords in their rules text to simplify describing what actions to perform. The symbols refer to each of the play zones - Draw Pile (a purple card with a 'V' on it), Discard Pile (a red waste bin with an 'X' on it), Hand (a blue imprint of a hand) and Field of View (a green eye). The keywords are shorthand for more detailed rules text.

| Keyword | Description |
|---|---|
| DRAW | The player must take the top card of the Draw Pile and put it into their Hand. |
| DISCARD | The player must take a card from their Hand and put it face-up into the Discard Pile. |
| PASS | The player must take a card from their Hand and move it to the Hand of a specified player. |
| STEAL | The player must look at the cards in any other player's Hand, take any card from that player's Hand and put it into their own Hand. |
| SWAP | The player must exchange any card in their Field of View with any card in another player's Field of View. |
| REVEAL | Cards with the REVEAL keyword may be used in one of two ways. The first way is to play it normally during your turn and perform the actions (if any) stated on the card (except for the actions stated after the REVEAL keyword). The second way is to show the card from your Hand to all players, during any player's turn, and perform only the actions stated after the REVEAL keyword. |
| CANCEL | Cards with the CANCEL keyword are used to cancel other actions. The actions that can be cancelled are stated on the cancelling card. When a player cancels a card, both the cancelled and cancelling cards are moved to the Discard Pile, unless otherwise stated, and the actions that were cancelled do not happen (even if the actions would have affected more than one player). |
| REPLACE | The player may move up to a specified number of cards from their Field of View and put them face-up into the Discard Pile. The player then plays cards (one at a time), equal to the number of cards they put into the Discard Pile, from the top of the Draw Pile into their Field of View. The actions on the newly played cards are performed as normal. |
| HIDE | The player may put ('hide') a card in any player's Field of View face down underneath this card. The hidden card is considered not to be in a Field of View (for View-points and action purposes) but may be unhidden (and returned to the Field of View) if the hiding card is moved out of the Field of View (except for being hidden itself). Only the player whose card hid the card may look at the hidden card. |

=== Pseudo-Keywords ===
Long-form action descriptions are sometimes referred to using pseudo-keywords such as those listed in the table below.

| Pseudo-Keyword | Description | Used With These Cards |
|---|---|---|
| play | The player may play an extra card within their turn. | Shadow |
| remove | The player moves a card from their Field of View to the Discard Pile. | Mirage, Skewed View, Wandering Eyes, Evil Eye, Kaleidoscope |
| exchange | The player exchanges their Hand with another player's Hand. | Cross-eyed |
| copy | The player performs the actions on another card. | Mirror Image, Two-Way Mirror |
| turn | The player takes another turn or loses a turn. | See Into The Future, Blindsided |
| return | The player returns a card from the Discard Pile to their Hand. | All-Seeing Eye, Focus Attention |
| bounce | The player returns a card from the Field of View to their Hand. | Hindsight |
| take | The player moves a card from another player's Field of View to their Field of View. | Eye Catching |
| refresh deck | The Discard Pile and Draw Pile are shuffled together to make a new Draw Pile. | Refocus |
| dig and pick | The player looks at the top few cards of the Draw Pile, selects a card from those cards, places that card into their Hand and puts the remaining cards on top of the Draw Pile. | X-Ray Vision |
| hand back | The player places cards from their hand on top of the Draw Pile. | Lazy Eyes |
| protect | The player uses a card to redirect actions that would affect other cards to affect that card instead. | Eye on the Prize |

== Storyline ==
The concept of a Viewpoint storyline was first introduced in the Viewpoint Hustle animation, which was shown at the Viewpoint World Championships in December 2010. The animation depicts a group of characters with eyes for heads. The characters, known as Eye Guy, Speye Guy, Eye Gal and Evil Eye Guy, are playing a game of Viewpoint. After Evil Eye Guy is discovered to have cheated during the game, when a Viewpoint card falls from his sleeve, he tries to escape the other characters' wrath by running away. They then go in hot pursuit of Evil Eye Guy but, one-by-one, get taken out of the chase as Evil Eye Guy uses Viewpoint cards, such as Blindspot and Skewed View, to set up obstacles for them. Eye Guy avoids the obstacles and then uses his own card, Shadow, to dispatch Evil Eye Guy.

The Viewpoint Reflections expansion set introduces additional characters - Blind Freddie, the Lazy Eye Guys (Dirk and Pedro) and Evil Eye Pet - and storyline where the good Eyefolk (primarily Eye Guy, Speye Guy and Eye Gal) must prevent Evil Eye Guy from conquering the View-niverse (the entire Viewpoint universe).

Future animations are planned to coincide with the release of or championships associated with each Viewpoint set and will follow a general storyline where the good Eyefolk follow Evil Eye Guy to different dimensions by travelling through television sets, which he has specially programmed using Viewpoint cards.

The theme song for the Viewpoint Hustle animation was composed by up-and-coming contemporary piano artist Julala.

== Sets and Special Cards ==
| Set Name | Year released | No. of (Unique) Cards | Introduced Keywords | Tagline | Storyline |
|---|---|---|---|---|---|
| Viewpoint | 2009 | 70 (23) | DRAW, DISCARD, SWAP, STEAL, REVEAL, CANCEL, play, remove, exchange, copy, turn, return, bounce | Blindside your buddies! | Limited storyline within the card set; however, the Persistence of Vision card shows the Eyelets characters for the first time. The Viewpoint Hustle animation depicts the Eye Guy, Speye Guy, Eye Gal and Evil Eye Guy characters for the first time. |
| Viewpoint Reflections | 2011 | 70 (23) | REPLACE, PASS, refresh deck, dig and pick, hand back | Conquer the View-niverse! | Eye Guy and Speye Guy set out to rescue Eye Gal who has been trapped by Evil Eye Guy in the Mirror World. This is also the world where Evil Eye Guy steals Blind Freddie's eye. |
| Viewpoint Parallax | Scheduled for 2013 | 70 | TBD | TBD | Eye Guy, Eye Gal and Speye Guy follow Evil Eye Guy to the Parallax World in an attempt to recover Blind Freddie's eye. |
| Zombie Viewpoint | Scheduled for 2015 | 70 | RESURRECT, roaming card, control | TBD | The Eyefolk Home Dimension is invaded by Zombeyes after Evil Eye Guy accidentally opens a portal to their realm. |

Three cards have been released separately from the major sets - Eye on the Prize, Lookalikes and Eyelets. These cards were released in 2011 as special rewards to be awarded to players for attaining a specific tournament leaderboard ranking. The cards may be used in any casual-play deck and in tournament decks (where the use of those cards has been sanctioned).

=== Fan Cards ===
A number of fan-designed cards have been made, which can be used in non-sanctioned events or in casual play.

== Strategies ==
=== Points-Variance Strategy ===
The objective of Viewpoint is to be the first player to reach 100 or more View-points. To do this, the primary strategy is for players to play cards that reduce their opponents' points totals or play cards that increase their own points total at a faster rate than their opponents'. The basic method to enable players to accumulate more points than their opponents is to play cards that remove cards from their opponents' Fields of View. Other ways to slow down opponents from scoring points include making them miss a turn, stealing the higher value cards from their hand or swapping their higher value cards out of their Field of View. The strategy of focusing on the difference between points totals is known as the points-variance strategy and is most-commonly used by novice players.

=== Value-Proposition Strategy ===
A stronger and more enduring strategy is to understand that the points values of most Viewpoint cards are balanced against the impact they have on the game. For example, Shadow, which is arguably the most powerful card in the game, is worth -15 View-points and allows a player to play an additional card each turn (effectively giving that player two turns to everyone one turn taken by their opponents). Conversely, a card like Shared Perspective is worth 20 View-points because it allows every player to draw a card. Typically, the higher-value, lower-impact cards only allow players to draw cards or make other players discard cards and the lower-value, higher-impact cards allow players to take extra turns or significantly reduce an opponent's total points. Therefore, it is sometimes advantageous to play lower-value cards because they might provide a significantly greater advantage over the course of the game. The strategy of weighing up a card's impact against its value throughout the game is known as the value-proposition strategy and is most-commonly used by experienced players.

=== Know The Combinations ===
Whilst certain cards are powerful on their own, some cards can have an even greater impact when used in combination. More experienced players take advantage of their knowledge of the game and how the cards interact to give them a better advantage. Some better known combinations include:

- Shadow + See Into The Future + Hindsight: With Shadow in the player's Field of View, play See Into The Future (as the first card play) to gain another turn and then Hindsight to return See Into The Future to Hand (as the second card play). Then replay See Into The Future to gain another turn. This combination can be repeated for as many times as there are Hindsight cards in the player's Hand.
- Cross-eyed + (Almost) Empty Hand: If the player only has a few cards (including Cross-eyed) in their Hand, they can play Cross-eyed to take an opponent's larger Hand whilst giving that opponent very few cards. This play is commonly seen soon after All-Seeing Eye is played to return Cross-eyed from the Discard Pile to a player's Hand.
- Peripheral Vision + Low-Value Card: Peripheral Vision is often played to swap a player's low-value card with their opponent's high-value card.

=== Knowledge Is Power ===
Most players use cards that steal other cards, like Insight and Eye Spy, only to deprive their opponents of cards; however, these cards may also be used to look at what cards opponents have in their Hands so those cards can be played around. For example, if a player observes that their opponent can cancel a discard action, because they have the Spectacles card in their Hand, then that player shouldn't play a discard card on their opponent unless they want to try to make them use the Spectacles card. Also, players which have cards stolen from them should take notice of what cards were taken as it can give an indication as to the strategies that the opponent who stole the cards has.

=== 1-on-1 Strategies ===
Card advantage on the table and in players' Hands is extremely important in 2-player games. Since there is less interaction in 2-player Viewpoint games and greater shifts in board position (the quantity and quality of the cards in each player's Field of View) are harder to recover from when there are fewer players to keep their opponents in check, the preferred course of action for experienced players is to use cards that give a 2-for-1 (or better) advantage. That is, cards that steal multiple cards from an opponent's Hand or remove multiple cards from an opponent's Field of View.

=== Strategy in Games With 3+ Players ===
Card accumulation (the act of collecting sufficient quantities of necessary cards) is very important in games with more than two players. Since there is a finite number of cards in a Viewpoint deck and the more players there are in a game then the faster the Draw Pile runs out, it is crucial for players to have enough cards in their Hand to enable them to reach 100 View-points. Experienced players typically draw many cards during these types of games or prepare their Hand so that they can exchange it or steal their opponents' cards should the Draw Pile run out.

As with most multiplayer games, diplomacy is an important consideration when playing Viewpoint with 3 or more players. It is often useful to form alliances (temporary or otherwise) with other players by agreeing not to do anything detrimental to each other. This has the effect of protecting the allied players from cards that would otherwise be used against those players. Also, players will often make a decision based on which player they think is the closest to winning or they perceive to be their greatest threat to winning. It is often prudent for players to make themselves less-conspicuous by building up their points totals slowly and saving their bigger plays for when their opponents have expended their more powerful cards on the other players.

=== Other Strategies ===
Other strategies that may be used in Viewpoint include:

- Card counting, which benefits players by helping them to surmise what cards are in other players' Hands. Many top players try to memorise each card (including their quantities) in the deck so they can more easily determine what cards are in their opponents' Hands or remain in the Draw Pile.
- Using cards as commodity that can be bargained with and sharing the effect of the card with certain players. This is often used in 2-on-2 or 3-on-3 team games.
- Combining strategies by selecting the best strategies to use in a given game state (the phase that the game is in, such as early, mid or late game). For example, a player might start the game by stealing cards, then in the mid-game use cards to remove cards from their opponents' Fields of View and finally playing their higher-value, lower-impact cards in the late-game.

== Tournaments ==
Viewpoint tournaments are typically run using a knock-out or round-robin format (or combination of both) using one or more of the Viewpoint sets. Any number of players can participate in a Viewpoint tournament. The Tournament Organiser usually prescribes the tournament format, set(s) to use and number of rounds to be played but is often influenced by the number of players in the tournament and the time allotted to conduct the tournament. The Head Judge has jurisdiction over the activities that occur during the tournament and is supported by the Tournament Organiser. The Tournament Organiser often fulfils the duties of the Head Judge.

During a tournament, players are grouped into 2 to 6-player matches (consisting of one or more games of Viewpoint) with the winner of each match-round advancing to the next round (in the knock-out format) or being awarded maximum points for the round (in the round-robin format). If the tournament is sanctioned (i.e. conducted using the Official Viewpoint Tournament Rules), the final standings from a tournament may then be submitted to 93 Made Games, which then updates the championship leaderboard.

Near the end of the tournament season, the top ranked players are invited to participate in the Viewpoint World Championships. The winner of this tournament is declared the Viewpoint World Champion. The world champion for 2009-10 was Nathan Anderson. The two runners-up were Alex Fleig and Will Yung. The top three players are awarded trophies and prize money.

At the end of each tournament season, the player with the most points on the championship leaderboard is declared the Viewpoint Player of the Year. The player of the year for 2009-10 was Nathan Anderson (54 leaderboard points). Alexander Done, who led the player of the year race for most of the 2009–10 season until the world championship final, finished second on 49 leaderboard points.

Other tournaments are also held during the tournament season including:

- Queensland State Championship - Won by Alexander Done in the 2009–10 season.
- New South Wales State Championship - Won by Nissa Waddell in the 2009–10 season.
- Viewpoint State of Origin - Won by Queensland (Sean Carroll, Alexander Done and Keith Done) 2-to-1 in the 2009–10 season. Note that this tournament was not sanctioned for championship leaderboard purposes as it used a 3-on-3 team variant as opposed to the 1-vs-N (where N equal 1 to 5 players) individual variant.

Tournaments winners for the 2011-12 tournament season include:

- Queensland State Champion - Nigel Bell.
- New South Wales State Champion - Jacob Moriarty.
- Australian Champion - Lindsay Heming.
- Viewpoint State of Origin - Won by New South Wales (Lindsay Heming, Will Yung and Victor Areces) 2-to-1. Note that this tournament was not sanctioned for championship leaderboard purposes as it used a 3-on-3 team variant as opposed to the 1-vs-N (where N equal 1 to 5 players) individual variant.

== Awards ==
Viewpoint was short-listed for the Best Australian Game by Boardgames Australia in 2011. The nomination was announced at the Toy and Game Expo, Sydney, Australia on 9 June 2012.

== Merchandise ==
Most Viewpoint merchandise is available through the Viewpoint tournament rewards program and includes Playmats, T-shirts, Mouse Pads, Showbags, Mugs, Pens, Posters and Post Cards.
