= Cardinal Syn =

1998 video game

- European box art
- Developer: Kronos Digital Entertainment
- Publishers: EU: Sony Computer Entertainment; NA: 989 Studios
- Producers: Andy Koo; Sany Abe-Tsukii
- Designer: John Paik
- Programmer: Mohammad Asaduzzaman
- Artist: Albert Co
- Writers: Stanley Liu; Patricia Winters
- Composer: Brian Min
- Platform: PlayStation
- Release: PAL: June 26, 1998; NA: August 25, 1998
- Genre: Fighting
- Modes: Single-player, multiplayer

Cardinal Syn is a 1998 fighting video game developed by Kronos Digital Entertainment and published by Sony Computer Entertainment for the PlayStation. 989 Studios released it in North America. It received mixed reviews.

== Gameplay ==
Gameplay screenshot

Cardinal Syn is 3D fighting game with free roaming features that allow the player to move around a small interactive stage during the fight, similar to Ehrgeiz and Bushido Blade. Moving away from the sci-fi theme in Criticom, Cardinal Syn takes place in a dark medieval and bloody world. The combatants too fit within this dark fantasy design and are somewhat similar to Dungeons & Dragons, and a great number of them non-human, each armed with melee weapons fitting for the style. The title character gives access to combos, juggles, stage hazards, finishing moves, projectiles and battlefield power-ups.

Small crates found in each stage can be broken open to acquire items.

== Plot ==
Warfare had engulfed the Clans of the Bloodlands for many generations, each having a great hatred for the other. But one day a mysterious being put a stop to the carnage, summoning all the clans together and read from his Book of Knowledge which spoke of the harmony they could achieve by uniting in peace. For many years, the Clans put aside their weapons and enjoyed peace under the guidance of the stranger they had named the "Wanderer". Then when the land seemed to be paling and dying, the stranger divided the Book into scrolls and gave one to each clan before he vanished before their very eyes. It took no time at all before the Clans were at each other's throats, vying for control of all the scrolls in the Book's entirety and war again fiercely reclaimed the Bloodlands.

In the middle of a particularly brutal battle, a mysterious and powerful sorceress known as Syn appeared brandishing the icon of the Wanderer that he had used as a symbol of clan unity. She coerced the clan leaders to hand their scrolls over to her where she turned them into three inscribed swords which held the knowledge of the Book. She then declared a tournament. Each clan would send its greatest warrior to engage in battles to the death. The survivor and winner of the tournament would be declared ruler of their Clan and given the entire Bloodlands to command, as well as gain access to the secrets of the swords. Yet that first tournament saw no winner, as Syn herself secretly killed the final warrior. Centuries passed and the wars raged on, but now a new tournament is about to be held and the Clan leaders are sending their very best to battle for the rite to power.

== Characters ==
Cardinal Syn has eight playable fighting characters, each with their own goal for retrieving the Book of Knowledge:

- Mongoro, a cannibalistic cyclops
- Plague, an undead corpse
- Nephra, an Egyptian princess
- Vanguard, a knight
- Heckler, an insane jester
- McKrieg, a dwarf
- Princess Orion
- Finkster, a thief

== Development ==
The game was showcased at E3 1997.

== Reception ==
Reception

Aggregate score
Aggregator	Score
GameRankings	57%

Review scores
Publication	Score
AllGame	2/5
CNET Gamecenter	4/10
Electronic Gaming Monthly	3.125/10 (Note: Four critics of Electronic Gaming Monthly gave the game each a score of 4/10, 5/10, 3.5/10, and 3/10 in an early review.)
EP Daily	5/10
Game Informer	7/10
GameRevolution	B−
GameSpot	4.8/10
Hyper	70%
IGN	5.5/10
Next Generation	2/5
Official U.S. PlayStation Magazine	3/5

The game received "mixed or average" reviews according to the review aggregation website GameRankings. Next Generation's early review called it "a pretty, if confusing, waste of time and effort". GamePro's early review said it "isn't the kind of action sedative you need—especially in the middle of a heated match. The Syn committed in this game is syn-ple: Mediocrity." (Note: GamePro gave the game 4/5 for graphics, two 3.5/5 scores for sound and control, and 3/5 for fun factor in an early review.)

Official U.S. PlayStation Magazine, with a score of 3 out of 5, praised "beautiful graphics" and a "KILLER end-boss!", but were critical of AI and that it would not be deep for fighting game enthusiasts. GameSpot in its review wrote that "Cardinal Syn has some nice graphics and sound to set it apart from other games in the genre [..] with its typical weapon-based fighting system that plays like Soul Blade and Dynasty Warriors, Cardinal Syn just ends up coming off as another 3D fighting game knockoff".

A common theme that many reviewers, including Electronic Gaming Monthly, had, was that the computer AI is too weak. On a more positive note, Game Informer, while acknowledging that the game has flaws in gameplay and controls, praised Cardinal Syn's concept, presentation and gore.
