= Viewpoint (Canadian TV program) =

- Genre: Current affairs
- Created by: Eugene Hallman
- Narrated by: Earl Cameron
- Country of origin: Canada
- Original language: English
- No. of seasons: 18

Production
- Producers: Gordon Bruce (1966–1968); Donald McNeill (1968–1969); Nicholas Steed (1969–1972); Ian Murray (1973–1976)
- Running time: 5 minutes, 50 seconds

Original release
- Network: CBC Television
- Release: 1957 – 2 January 1976

Related
- Special Assignment

Viewpoint is a Canadian current affairs television program which aired on CBC Television from 1957 to 1976.

== Premise ==
This program began in late 1957 to feature analysis, interviews and opinion involving various individuals following CBC's national newscast.

In one episode, for example, the Financial Post's Clive Baxter attempted to grill Stanley Knowles regarding plans to form what would become the New Democratic Party.

An equivalent French-language program, Commentaires, began on Radio-Canada in 1959.

In 1975, the CBC's director of information programming (Knowlton Nash) cancelled Viewpoint under the pretext that the program caused the following local newscasts at 11:30 p.m. to lose three-quarters of their viewership ratings. A new public affairs background program was scheduled for Viewpoint's time slot, beginning on 5 January 1976.
