= Point of view =

Point of view or point-of-view may refer to:

== Concept and technique ==
- Point of view (literature) or narrative mode, the perspective of the narrative voice; the pronoun used in narration
- Point of view (philosophy), an attitude how one sees or thinks of something
- Point-of-view shot, a technique in motion photography
  - Point-of-view pornography, a subset of gonzo pornography in which a performer also holds the camera

== Organizations ==
- Point of View (company), a producer of computer gaming graphics cards
- Point of View Movie Production Co. Ltd., of Hong Kong filmmaker Dennis Law Sau-Yiu

== Geography ==
- Point of View Park, a parklet in Pittsburgh, Pennsylvania, US
- Pointe of View Winery, a winery in North Dakota, US

== Art ==
- Point of View (Passmore), an art installation by Matthew Passmore in San Francisco, California and Haifa, Israel
- Point of View (Stephan), a 2016 public artwork in Salt Lake City, Utah, U.S.
- Point of View (West), a 2006 public sculpture by James A. West of George Washington and Guyasuta
- Points of View (Surls), a 1991 sculpture by James Surls, in Houston, Texas, US

== Literature ==
- Point of View, a 1912 play by Jules Eckert Goodman
- Point of View (magazine), national magazine of the Documentary Organization of Canada
- "Point of View" (short story), by Isaac Asimov published in 1975
- "Point of View", a short story by Damon Knight and illustrated by Chris Van Allsburg
- The Point of View of My Work as an Author, an 1859 philosophical autobiography by the Danish philosopher Søren Kierkegaard
- Points of View, an essay by W. Somerset Maugham

== Film, television, and radio ==
- Point of View (film), a 1965 documentary film
- "Point of View" (Stargate SG-1), an episode of the television series
- Point of View (radio show), a former talk show hosted by Marlin Maddoux, renamed POVe With Kerby Anderson
- Point of View, an Indonesian viewer opinion television series broadcast by SCTV
- A Point of View, a weekly BBC Radio 4 programme in which a guest speaker reflected about a topical issue
- "Points of View" (Doctors), a 2003 television episode
- Points of View (TV programme), a British viewer opinion television series
- POV (TV series), a PBS television program that features independent nonfiction films

== Video games ==
- Point of View, a 2001 video game, see List of interactive films
- Point of View, a 2003 video game, a mod to the video game Half-Life, see List of GoldSrc mods

== Music ==
=== Albums ===
- Point of View (Cassandra Wilson album), 1986
- Point of View (Spyro Gyra album), 1989
- Points of View (album), a 1998 album by jazz bassist Dave Holland
- Point of View, a 2023 album by Takanashi Kiara

=== Songs ===
- "Point of View" (DB Boulevard song), a single by DB Boulevard
- "(A) Point of View", a 1970 song by José Feliciano
- "Point of View" (Fates Warning song), a 1991 single by the progressive metal band Fates Warning
- "Point of View" (Matumbi song), 1979
- "Point of View", a 2007 song by Tiny Masters of Today with Kimya Dawson

== See also ==
- Perspective (disambiguation)
- POV (disambiguation)
- View (disambiguation)
- View model (disambiguation)
- Viewpoint (disambiguation)
- "Point of You", a 2014 song by Phase
