= Viewing =

Viewing may refer to:

- Remote viewing
- Social viewing
- Viewing (funeral), the part of open-casket funerals where family and friends see the body of the deceased person for their final respects and goodbyes. In some cases of closed-casket funerals, a body would be embalmed for a private viewing.
- Wildlife viewing

== See also ==
- Far sight (disambiguation)
- Public viewing area
