= Fear Effect =

2000 video game

- Developers: Kronos Digital Entertainment; Implicit Conversions (re-release)
- Publisher: Eidos Interactive
- Director: John Zuur Platten
- Designers: Scott J. Compton; Christian Dailey; John Zuur Platten
- Programmer: Michael Fernie
- Artist: Pakin Liptawat
- Writer: John Zuur Platten
- Composers: Matt Furniss; Jason Agolia
- Platforms: PlayStation; Microsoft Windows; Nintendo Switch; PlayStation 4; PlayStation 5
- Release: PlayStation; NA: February 24, 2000; EU: March 17, 2000 Re-release August 29, 2025
- Genre: Action-adventure
- Mode: Single-player

Fear Effect is a 2000 action-adventure video game developed by Kronos Digital Entertainment and published by Eidos Interactive for the PlayStation. Set in the year 2050, the player controls three mercenaries in Hong Kong. The game contains elements of survival horror and stealth.

Fear Effect received a mainly positive critical reception, with praise given to its cinematic presentation and unique visuals but criticism given to its difficulty. A prequel was released one year later entitled Fear Effect 2: Retro Helix. Another game, Fear Effect Sedna, was released in 2018.

== Gameplay ==
Fear Effect features gameplay with unshaded characters textured to resemble cel-shading, notably being one of the first games to attempt the technique. Rather than using pre-rendered 2D backgrounds, the environments are composed of streaming or looping full-motion video. As a consequence, the game is composed of four discs. There are also puzzles interspersed between action sequences, similar to other games of the survival horror genre.

The player controls one of three mercenaries (either Hana, Deke, or Glas) through areas filled with human and non-human enemies. The game controls are similar to traditional survival horror tank controls, with an exception being that the characters can run and shoot simultaneously. When wielding two guns (one in each hand), they are also able to shoot multiple enemies at the same time. Another feature is the ability to duck and roll; while facing a number of the armed foes, the player can roll a short distance and avoid taking enemy fire.

The game's title refers to the player's life bar, a meter which resembles a pulsing EKG. When the player is damaged, the green line of the EKG will pulse faster and turn red. It is possible to 'regain' health by performing acts that will calm that character's heart rate. These include solving a puzzle or sneaking behind a guard to perform a stealth kill. Both will be rewarded with a health boost that brings the meter back to green.

== Plot ==
Set around the year 2050, when Wee Ming Lam, the daughter of a powerful Hong Kong Triad boss, disappears, a trio of mercenaries search for her in the city. They have not been hired to find her, but they intend to kidnap the girl before her father's men locate her and hold her for ransom. Wee Ming has vanished into the fictional Shan Xi protectorate; Hana Tsu-Vachel, the lead character and femme fatale of the group, used to work in a brothel somewhere in that region.

Hana arrives in Hong Kong accompanied by her partners, Royce Glas and Jacob "Deke" DeCourt. What begins as a simple snatch and grab turns into a fiasco: The father of the runaway, Mr. Lam, attributes his fortune and power to a pact he made with demons long ago. Wee Ming, who is a paper doll given life, has been scheduled to serve as a sacrifice to Yim Lau Wong, the mythical "King of Hell". Hana's contact inside Mr. Lam's organization, Jin, is discovered, tortured, and left to die with a bomb strapped to his chest. Hana frees him, but he is killed shortly after. Meanwhile, Glas is attacked by a VTOL jet and forced to flee into Mr. Lam's building. After avenging Jin, Hana is captured and beaten by Mr. Lam and his thugs. Glas is able to rescue Hana, and the duo make their escape where they meet Deke in front of the hotel they are staying at. While listening to Jin's last message for Hana, the trio are forced off a bridge but are able to swim to a junk. While sailing down a river, Deke spots Wee Ming amongst a burning village. Deke and Glas give chase while Hana gets dressed, but all three are separated by the undead villagers.

They stumble upon a military train where the hostile soldiers shoot anyone on sight for fear of the villagers. Hana and Deke wreck the train trying to steal it, but Glas is able to find a jeep with Wee Ming sitting inside. She asks to be taken to a Madam Chen's restaurant, which doubles as a brothel, hoping to find answers about her existence. When Glas is caught sneaking in the brothel, Mr. Lam surprises him, cutting off his left arm. At the same time, Deke is murdered while trying to infiltrate the brothel from upstairs. Hana sneaks in by dressing up like one of the prostitutes, where she runs into Wee Ming again after she had been dragged off by Madam Chen, who is working for Mr. Lam. After being splashed with Deke's blood, Wee Ming's powers activate, transforming the working girls and Madam Chen's thugs into demons.

The one-armed Glas reawakens in a meat locker. Surprised to find he is still alive, he surmises that Mr. Lam must be planning a slow death for him. Wee Ming arrives and tries her best to aid him. When Hana storms in to confront her former boss, Madam Chen, she learns that Chen is actually a demon in disguise. In the ensuing fight, Chen and her minions are killed, but Mr. Lam disappears with his daughter into a portal to Hell. Determined to save Wee Ming from whatever fate Mr. Lam has in store for her, Hana follows them into the portal, with Glas reawakening, and frees himself to give chase.

In a surreal journey through Hell, Hana meets the Black and White Guards of Impermanence who give her cryptic messages about her fate. Glas encounters the reanimated corpse of Deke, who is being tortured for the many murders he has committed. Deke takes on a grotesque demonic form and attacks Glas. After defeating Deke, Glas promises to avenge him. Meanwhile, Hana confronts Yim Lau Wong, who explains that Hell has become overburdened with the souls of the guilty. Once Wee Ming is returned to the netherworld, Yim Lau Wong will be able to expand the reaches of Hell and consume Earth. Hana was chosen to look after Wee Ming because Yim Lau Wong desired someone "ruthless" to be her guardian.

Glas reappears and tries to kill Wee Ming, believing her to be the root of the chaos. During the tense standoff between Hana and Glas, the player is given a choice over which of them should die. This decision will determine the final boss as well as the subsequent ending. On the "Hard" difficulty setting, a third option will become available: spare the lives of both Glas and Hana. In this ending, the pair emerge from the smoldering wreckage of the brothel, where they find a befuddled Deke sitting on a toilet. Deke has no memory of being killed, believing he has taken a bump to the head, and asks how they made out on the "deal". As he hoists himself out of the pit, Glas is stunned to realize that his left arm has been completely restored. The three partners walk off into the sunrise to continue their exploits.

== Reception ==
Reception

Aggregate score
Aggregator	Score
GameRankings	85%

Review scores
Publication	Score
AllGame	4.5/5
CNET Gamecenter	9/10
Edge	6/10
Electronic Gaming Monthly	9/10 (Note: In Electronic Gaming Monthly's review of the game, one critic gave it 9.5/10, another gave it 8.5/10, and the rest gave it each a score of 9/10.)
EP Daily	8/10
Eurogamer	6/10
Game Informer	8.25/10
GameFan	87%
GameRevolution	A−
GameSpot	8.5/10
GameSpy	89%
IGN	8.9/10
Next Generation	4/5
Official U.S. PlayStation Magazine	4.5/5
The Cincinnati Enquirer	3.5/4

Fear Effect received generally positive reviews from critics. GameFan gave it a favorable review while it was still in development. Edge praised the game's tight script and distinctive graphics, but criticized its unbalanced gameplay and clumsy control system, stating that they "make the boss encounters absurdly difficult". The magazine concluded that, "In such a beautiful cinematic game, featuring clever plotting and scripting, such deficiencies are even more offensive." However, Blake Fischer of NextGen called it "One of the most exciting and innovative adventures to show up on PlayStation, dragged down only slightly by a few sticky gameplay issues."

Four-Eyed Dragon of GamePro said of the game in one review, "All told, Fear Effect blends a host of nifty features to create a well-balanced, action-packed game. Though not for the squeamish, it's well worth a look from anyone craving an intense, challenging adventure." (Note: GamePro gave the game three 5/5 scores for graphics, sound, and fun factor, and 4/5 for control in one review.) In another GamePro review, Uncle Dust called it "an amazing game, full of action, puzzles and characters you actually give a damn about. The solid integration of visual design and solid gameplay makes Fear Effect a must for any survival horror or action-adventure fan." (Note: GamePro gave the game 5/5 for graphics, two 4.5/5 scores for sound and fun factor, and 3.5/5 for control in another review.)

The game sold 170,000–175,000 projected units in the U.S., according to the NPD TRSTS Videogame Service.

=== Accolades ===
The game was nominated for the "Best Adventure Game" award at GameSpot's Best and Worst of 2000 Awards, which went to Resident Evil – Code: Veronica. It won the award for the same title at the Official U.S. PlayStation Magazine 2000 Editors' Awards. It also won the award for "Adventure" in Editors' Choice, but was a runner-up for the same category in Readers' Choice at IGN's Best of 2000 Awards.

== Legacy ==
A prequel titled Fear Effect 2: Retro Helix was released in 2001 for the PlayStation. In 2016, Fear Effect Sedna was announced after French studio Sushee pitched the idea to Square Enix; it was eventually released in 2018.

In August 2017, Square Enix announced a remake of Fear Effect titled Fear Effect Reinvented. It was being developed by MegaPixel Studio S.A. and to be published by Square Enix for Microsoft Windows, Nintendo Switch, PlayStation 4 and Xbox One. In September 2023, it was reported and later confirmed that the game was cancelled.

In June 2024, it was announced that Fear Effect would be released for Microsoft Windows, PlayStation 4, PlayStation 5, and Nintendo Switch in 2025. It was eventually released on August 29, 2025.
