= Kronos Digital Entertainment =

American video game developer

- Industry: Video games
- Founded: 1992
- Defunct: 2002
- Headquarters: Pasadena, California, U.S.
- Key people: Stanley Liu
- Products: Fear Effect series

Kronos Digital Entertainment was an American video game developer, founded by Stan Liu in 1992. It developed original properties, beginning with the visually appealing early 3D fighting games Criticom, Dark Rift and Cardinal Syn (called the "Trilogy of Terror" by one gaming journalist).

Kronos gained greater critical and commercial success for its later Fear Effect series with Eidos, and retained all rights to the franchise. It was developing the third Fear installment, Fear Effect Inferno, when Eidos discontinued funding following a major budget restructuring. The developer then shopped the game around to other publishers before failing to secure a deal and finish it. It dissolved soon after, finally releasing Fear Effect 2: Retro Helix. Outside of video games, they provided computer animation to Spider Man on Fox Kids.

== Games ==
Year	Game	Platform(s)
1995	Criticom	PlayStation, Sega Saturn
1997	Meat Puppet	Microsoft Windows
1997	Dark Rift	Nintendo 64, Microsoft Windows
1998	Cardinal Syn	PlayStation
2000	Fear Effect	PlayStation
2001	Fear Effect 2: Retro Helix	PlayStation

== Animation ==
Year	Television	Original network(s)
1994	Spider-Man	Fox Kids
