= The View (disambiguation) =

The View is an American morning talk show on ABC, broadcast since 1997.

The View may also refer to:

== Television ==
- The View (Irish TV programme), an Irish television arts programme, broadcast from 1999 to 2011

== Music ==
=== Bands ===
- The View (band), a Scottish indie rock band
- The View, a band fronted by Australian musician Chris Collins

=== Albums and EPs ===
- The View (album), a 1993 album by Chad Wackerman
- The View, a 1999 album by Eureka Farm
- The View, a 2003 EP by Immaculate Machine

=== Songs ===
- "The View" (song), a 2011 song by Lou Reed and Metallica
- "The View", a 2004 song by Modest Mouse from Good News for People Who Love Bad News
- "The View", a 2019 song by Sara Evans and the Barker Family Band from The Barker Family Band
- "The View", a 2021 song by Stray Kids from Noeasy

== See also ==
- View (disambiguation)
