= ViEWER =

Computer program

- Stable release: 2.25
- Written in: C++
- Operating system: Windows NT family
- Platform: x86
- Available in: English
- Website: webpages.uidaho.edu/~bdyre/viewer.htm

ViEWER, the Virtual Environment Workbench for Education and Research, is a proprietary, freeware computer program for Microsoft Windows written by researchers at the University of Idaho for the study of visual perception and complex immersive three-dimensional environments.

It was created using C++ and OpenGL, and has been used by Dr. Brian Dyre, Dr. Steffen Werner, Dr. Ernesto Bustamante, Dr. Ben Barton, and their undergraduate and graduate researchers in visual perception, signal detection, and child-safety experiments.
