= Viewer =

Viewer may refer to:

- Colliery viewer, an engineer or expert who supervised or advised a coal mine
- File viewer, application software that decodes and displays the data in a computer file
- Image viewer, a computer program capable of displaying digital images
- Pocket Viewer, a range of personal digital assistants marketed by Casio
- A person who is engaged in remote viewing
- Slide viewer, a device for viewing slides of reversal film
- Television viewer, television industry term for a person watching television
- ViEWER, a computer program developed for studying visual perception in a virtual 3D environment
- Waveform viewer, a software tool for viewing the signal levels of either a digital or analog circuit design

== See also ==
- View-Master
