= Aston Martin Vantage (disambiguation) =

The Aston Martin Vantage is a 1972–73 British sports car. Other vehicles of this name include:

- 1951–1953 DB2 Vantage
- 1961–1963 DB4 Vantage
- 1963–1965 DB5 Vantage
- 1965–1969 DB6 Vantage
- 1972–1973 Aston Martin Vantage
- 1977–1989 V8 Vantage
- 1986–1989 V8 Vantage Volante
- 1988–1990 V8 Vantage Zagato
- 1992–1999 V8 Vantage (Virage)
- 1998 Project Vantage (an early concept for the Vanquish)
- 1999–2003 DB7 V12 Vantage
- 2005–2018 Vantage V8
- 2009–2018 Vantage V12
- 2018–present Vantage V8
- 2022–present Vantage V12
