= POV (surname) =

POV ᐱᐅᕖ
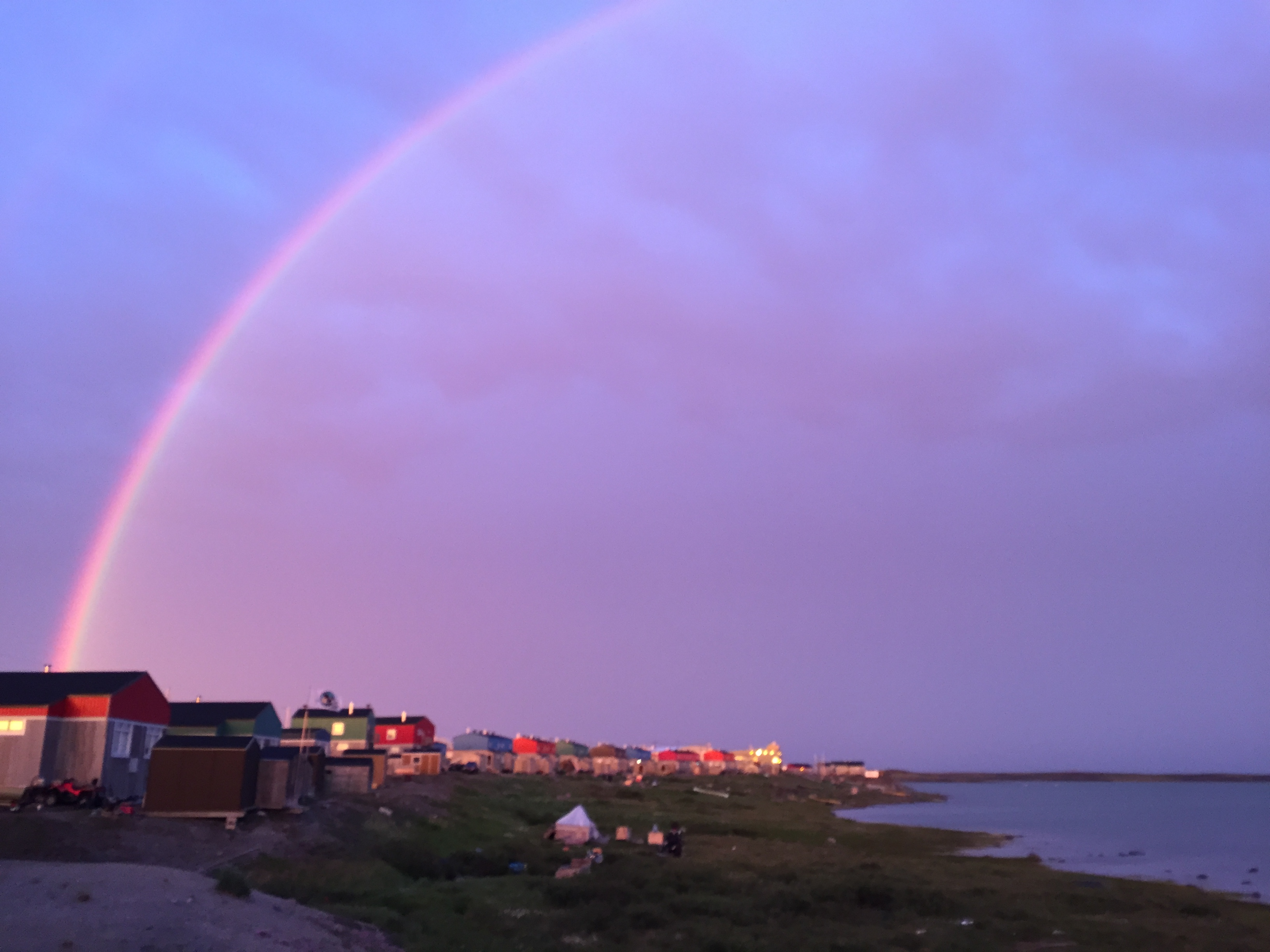
- Village of Puvirnituq
- Language: Inuktitut

Origin
- Language: English
- Region of origin: Puvirnituq

POV or Pov (ᐱᐅᕖ, piuvii) (pronounced P-O-V) is an Inuit surname officially assigned by non-Inuit officials to Inuit living in or near Puvirnituq (formerly known as Povungnatuk) when a person's second name or last name was too hard or long to write down for someone who did not speak Inuktitut.

== Examples ==
- Juani (Angutiguluk) POV (1910–1978), adopted elder brother of Taamusi Qumaq
- Abraham (Talirunili) POV (1927-1994), sculptor
- Johnny POV (E9-1469) (1908–1978), sculptor. Also known as Johnny Novalinga after the surname of his wife.

== See also ==
- Disc number, the identification Canada used for Inuit in the 20th century in lieu of surnames.
