= Power of Veto =

Power of Veto may refer to:

- Veto, in general
- United Nations Security Council veto power
- Power of Veto in the reality TV series Big Brother
