= Point of View (Passmore) =

Art installation by Matthew Passmore

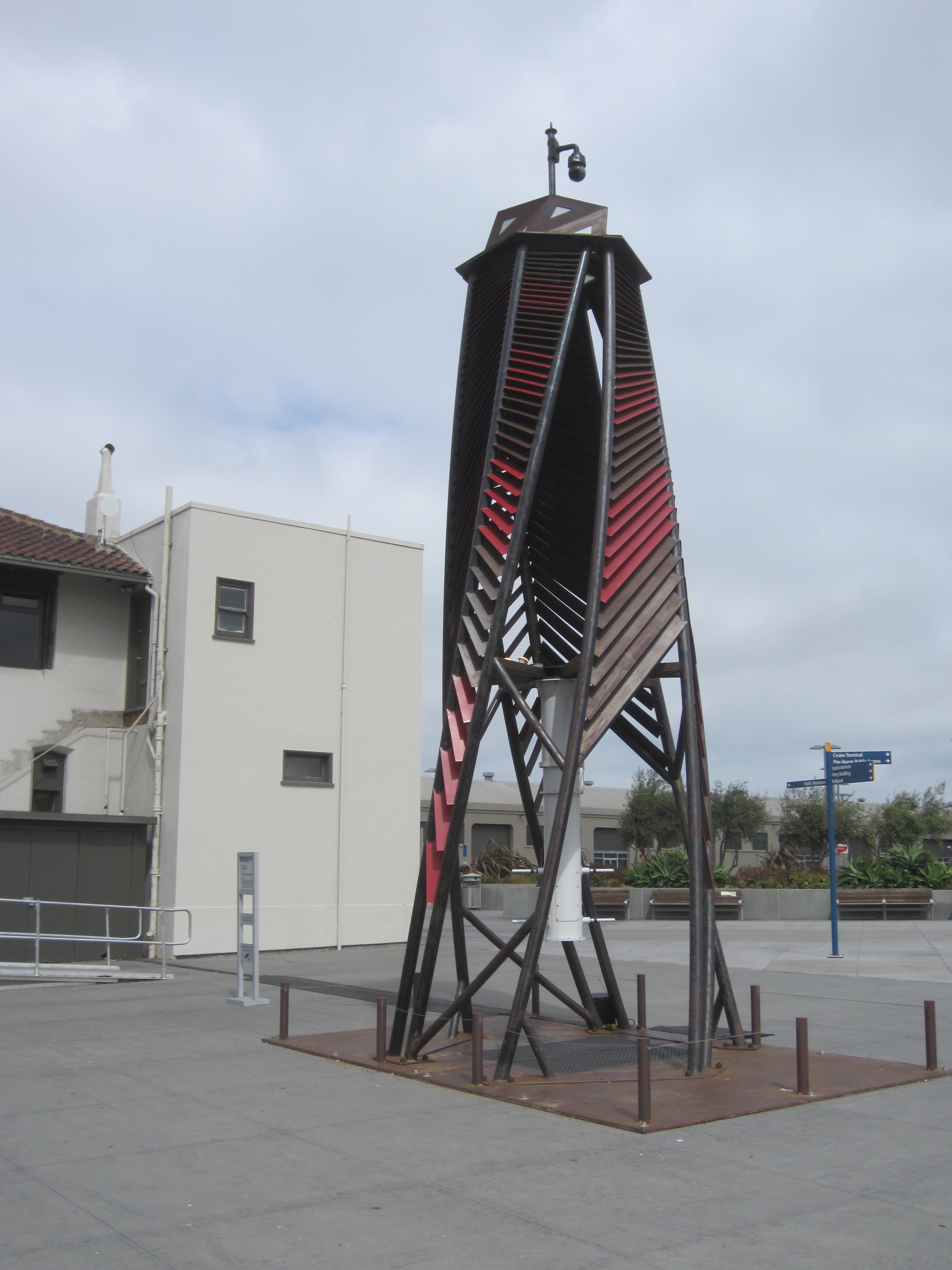
- The tower in San Francisco in 2018
- Artist: Matthew Passmore
- Location: Haifa; San Francisco

Point of View is an art installation, created by the California artist Matthew Passmore, consisting of two towers installed in Haifa, Israel, and San Francisco, California. The towers serve as periscopes, offering live views of the other city to viewers.
