= View =

View(s) may refer to:

== Common meanings ==
- Graphical projection in a technical drawing or schematic
- Opinion, a belief about subjective matters
- Page view, a visit to a World Wide Web page
- View, an instance of an observation of a YouTube video by a user

== Places ==
- View, Kentucky, an unincorporated community in Crittenden County
- View, Texas, an unincorporated community in Taylor County

== Arts, entertainment, and media ==
=== Music ===
- View (Shinee song), 2015
- Views (album), a 2016 album by Canadian rapper Drake
- View, the 2003 debut album by Bryan Beller
- Views, a 2001 album by Pekka Pohjola

=== Other uses in the arts ===
- View (magazine), an American literary and art magazine published from 1940 to 1947
- VIEWS, a podcast hosted by David Dobrik

== Technology ==
- View (SQL), a table generated from a stored relational database query
- VIEW, a word processor computer program developed by Acornsoft for the BBC Micro home computer
- Model–view–controller, a design pattern in software engineering
- Mutual view, the quality or degree of visibility of a satellite to a ground station in satellite communications
- View, Inc., American manufacturer of smart glass
- View model, a concept in enterprise architecture

== Other uses ==
- Panorama, a wide-angle view
- Scenic viewpoint, an elevated location where people can view scenery
- View (Buddhism), a charged interpretation of experience which intensely shapes and affects thought, sensation, and action
- World view, the fundamental cognitive orientation of an individual or society encompassing the entirety of the individual or society's knowledge and point-of-view

== See also ==
- Point of view (disambiguation)
- The View (disambiguation)
- Viewer (disambiguation)
- Viewing (disambiguation)
