= Perspective =

Perspective may refer to:

== Vision and mathematics ==
- Perspectivity, the formation of an image in a picture plane of a scene viewed from a fixed point, and its modeling in geometry
  - Perspective (graphical), representing the effects of visual perspective in graphic arts
  - Aerial perspective, the effect the atmosphere has on the appearance of an object as it is viewed from a distance
  - Perspective distortion (photography), the way that viewing a picture from the wrong position gives a perceived distortion
  - Perspective (geometry), a relation between geometric figures
  - Vue d'optique or perspective view, a genre of etching popular during the second half of the 18th century and into the 19th.

== Film and television ==
- Perspective (film series), a 2012–2020 Canadian film series by B. P. Paquette
- Perspective (2019 film), an American adult romance drama
- Perspectives (TV series), a 2011–2016 British arts documentary series

== Music ==
- Perspective Records, an American record label

=== Albums ===
- Perspective (America album), 1984
- Perspective (Jason Becker album), 1996
- Perspective (Lawson album), 2016
- Perspective (P-Model album), 1982
- Perspective (Rick Nelson album), 1969
- Perspective (EP), by Tesseract, 2012
- Perspectives, by House vs. Hurricane, 2010
- Perspective, EP by Jlin, 2023
- Perspective, by Prague, 2010

=== Songs ===
- "Perspective", by YoungBoy Never Broke Again from Richest Opp, 2023
- "Perspectives", by Kutless from Sea of Faces, 2004

== Other uses ==
- Point of view (literature), the related experience of the narrator
- Point of view (philosophy), in philosophy and psychology, the context for opinions, beliefs and experiences
- Perspective (video game), a 2012 puzzle game
- Perspectives on Political Science, peer-reviewed academic journal
- The Perspective, a news and history website

== See also ==
- Perspecta, a motion picture sound system
- Perspectivism, in philosophy
- Point of view (disambiguation)
