= Criticom =

1995 video game

- North American cover art
- Developer: Kronos Digital Entertainment (Note: Ported to Sega Saturn by Point of View)
- Publisher: Vic Tokai
- Producer: Stanley Liu
- Composer: Carlton Liu
- Platforms: PlayStation, Saturn
- Release: PlayStation: NA: November 29, 1995; EU: March 15, 1996; JP: October 4, 1996; Saturn: NA: March 26, 1996; JP: February 28, 1997
- Genre: Fighting
- Modes: Single-player, multiplayer

Criticom is a 1995 fighting video game developed by Kronos Digital Entertainment for the PlayStation. It was originally released by Vic Tokai on November 29, 1995, followed by a Sega Saturn port in 1996. An early polygonal 3D fighting game, it features a mystery sci-fi backstory and eight fighters from across the galaxy, each attempting to get their hands on a crystal artifact. Critics praised the game's visuals and presentation but widely panned its gameplay mechanics.

== Gameplay ==
Gameplay screenshot of Gorm vs Yenji

The fighting action takes place on a round, elevated platform. Each fighter begins the fight with a full power meter and one power meter refill in reserve that is activated when the primary meter is depleted. There are no rounds. The fight runs until one fighter is knocked out (no more power in their meter), one is knocked out of the arena (or steps/jumps out), or the time runs out. As the game progresses, the player gains access to two additional "levels" for the character, which unlocks new moves and gives the character a new appearance.

== Plot and characters ==
In a galaxy named Hyporia, two alien races, the Nezom and Zerai clans obtained a powerful crystalline stone called "The Relic", and anointed themselves "The Chosen Ones". The Chosen Ones used this power to subjugate the other races, exterminating those that failed to comply. After this era of war, The Chosen Ones began to enjoy a new age of peace. However, The Relic was stolen and The Chosen Ones' power was shaken. Now, warriors from all over the universe seek the relic, each with their own ambitions.

Characters are:

- Dayton Trent, a man hired by The Chosen Ones to find The Relic
- Delara Zerai, a young woman from the Zerai clan seeking vengeance on the one who stole the Relic
- Demonica, a mysterious creature from an alternate universe, it is unknown why she is after the Relic
- Sgt. Exene Dulait, a woman who seeks the Relic for its mystical powers in order to put an end to wars on her planet
- Gorm, a green lizard-like character from a dying race called Dorlons, believing that the Relic is the birthstone of their race
- S.I.D., standing for Sentient Integrated Droids, a robot whose goal is to destroy carbon based life forms
- Sonork Nezom, who killed his brother in an opportunity to become leader of The Chosen Ones
- Yenji, a ninja-like lady who witnessed the death of her family during war, coming back for vengeance against The Chosen Ones
- Emperor, Criticom's final boss; he had stolen the Relic and used its mystic powers for his own advantage

== Development ==
Criticom initially had a comic book character license and Sony Computer Entertainment as its publisher. As the game neared the end of the design phase, Sony took the license from Kronos Digital Entertainment and give it to one of their European subsidiaries. Rather than completely abandon their design work, Kronos opted to create new characters and shop the game concept to other publishers. Kronos president Stan Liu recounted:

In April of 1995, Vic Tokai approached us and agreed to publish our first original title provided that we can have it out by Christmas that very same year. Needless to say, we were extremely excited, but we didn't even have a single PlayStation development system as of yet! I repeatedly explained to our external producer from Vic Tokai that it was an impossible schedule, there was no possible way that we can create a game on a brand new platform in less than six-months time. We were then shown the actual contract and the check for the development. At that point, all our doubts instantly turned into desperation and greed! We needed and wanted so very badly to break into the game industry. We decided to take the chance and see if we truly had what it takes to make it happen, to be a "game developer."

The Sega Saturn version was ported by Point of View.

== Reception ==
Reception

Review scores
Publication	Score
IGN	3/10
Next Generation	2/5 (PS1)
PlayStation: The Official Magazine	7/10 (PS1)
Maximum	2/5 (PS1)
Play	87% (PS1)
Saturn Fan (JP)	4/10 (SAT)
Sega Saturn Magazine (JP)	4/10 (SAT)

The first news and screenshots of the game sparked an enthusiastic reaction from VideoGames, which called it "one of the coolest fighting game experiences in a long time", but ultimately went on to receive mostly negative reviews, as critics found the strong character designs and graphics to be outweighed by the poor animation and gameplay.

Reviewing the PlayStation version in GamePro, Scary Larry praised the game's interesting characters, "gorgeous" backgrounds, and sound effects. However, he felt the sluggish moves, particularly the throws, give the game less impact and make it more of a holdover until the next installment of Virtua Fighter or Toshinden. A reviewer for Next Generation said the game has impressive graphics, making particular note of the realistic lighting and shadow effects, but looks poor in motion due to the animation being done "by hand", without motion capture. While he found the character designs to be consistently "clever and imaginative", he deemed the game an overall failure due to the way the choppy frame rate interferes with the gameplay. In a later issue, the magazine commented that Criticom was "creative but ill-fated". Rich Leadbetter of Maximum remarked that the game has excellent graphics but poor animation and unexciting moves, and compared it unfavorably to Zero Divide and Tekken 2.

IGN criticized the controls, slow framerate, and the animation that lacks motion capture, calling it an "ultimately disappointing game", but gave praise to the light sourcing and the background designs. On a more positive note, PlayStation Magazine called it "a challenging combat game that only reveals its depth with time". Play praised the game's "rock-solid gameplay" and that while not as "compelling" as Tekken, it was still a good game.

GamePro reviewed the Saturn port in its July 1996 issue and called it the "worst fighting game of the year", stating that compared to the PlayStation version of the previous season, it has "even slower gameplay, choppy, simple graphics, and no chance at being any fun." They gave it a 2.0 out of 5 for graphics, 2.0 for sound, 1.5 for control, and 2.0 for funfactor. The German magazine Mega Fun noted that the PlayStation's JPEG module made the intro sequences appear better than on Saturn and the characters' limbs polygons were lacking in this version. The best score was given to the game's sound/FX, 74%, while graphics received 65%, and "fun" 59%.

According to Kronos president Stan Liu, the game was a commercial success, partly because it had been completed on budget and on time, and partly because it sold in respectable numbers, which he attributed chiefly to it being a fairly early PlayStation game.

=== Awards ===
Game Players magazine co-awarded Criticom for its Best Intro Sequence of the Year (1995), shared with Panzer Dragoon.

== Sequel ==
Kronos Digital Entertainment's next fighting game, Dark Rift, was originally announced under the title "Criticom II", and includes the character Demonica and Sonork from Criticom.
