= Card advantage =

Term used in collectible card games

Card advantage (often abbreviated CA) is a term used in collectible card game strategy to describe the state of one player having access to more cards than another player, usually by drawing more cards through in-game effects to increase the size of their hand. Although it applies to several collectible card games, the concept was first described early in the evolution of Magic: The Gathering strategy, where many early decks relied on a player drawing more cards than their opponent, and then using this advantage to play more cards and advance their position faster than their opponent. By 2007 it was recognized as one of the most important indicators of who is ahead in a game and has been utilized in the development of strategy for nearly every collectible card game created.

== Terminology ==
The basic concept of card advantage is one player having more cards in hand and/or in play than their opponent. Card advantage is generally indicated in terms of a positive number: if a player plays a card or utilizes an effect that allows them to draw more cards, such as Magic's Ancestral Recall, that player is said to have gained +n card advantage, with n representing the amount of cards drawn minus however many were used to draw said cards. In the scenario of playing Ancestral Recall, a player has gained three cards (the ones that were drawn) and spent one card to do so (the Ancestral Recall itself), leading to a card advantage of +2.

Card advantage is often also the result of making a play where a player's own cards are used to neutralize or eliminate a greater number of the opponent's cards. This form of card advantage is often stated in terms of X-for-Y, where X and Y are the number of cards of the opponent and the player, respectively. If X is bigger it expresses card advantage, and if Y is bigger it expresses card disadvantage; i.e. a 3-for-1 is a positive advantage, a 1-for-2 is not. Example: If in a game of Magic a player plays Day of Judgment, a card which destroys all creatures in play, when they themselves have no creatures in play and their opponent has two creatures in play, they are said to have gotten a "2-for-1", where 2 indicates the number of opposing cards removed from play and 1 indicates the card spent in order to accomplish this outcome.

In general, it is seen as a baseline to spend one card to get rid of one opposing card; this is often referred to colloquially as trading (not to be confused with the actual trading of cards outside of a game). A player who "trades" one card of their own for two of their opponent's is often gaining a long-term advantage as their opponent will run out of cards before they do.

== Forms of card advantage ==
Card advantage is typically generated in four ways:

- Draw effects — These are effects which cause players to draw more cards from their decks. Cards in hand can be played, so drawing more cards gives players more options and more versatility by which to create an advantage for themselves. Card advantage is generated when a player plays a card that draws more than one card, trading the card itself for more resources.
- Discard effects — These are cards which cause a player to put cards from their hand into their discard pile, referred to in Magic as the graveyard. This term is also used to refer to cards which put the cards from the player's hand into other inaccessible zones, such as exiling a card (also known as removing it from the game) or putting them back into the player's deck. A player can generate card advantage this way by casting a spell that makes the opponent discard two or more cards; as above, playing a card which makes your opponent discard just one card creates a 1-for-1, which does not create card advantage.
- "Sweeper" effects — These are cards which put multiple cards the opposing player has put into play into their discard pile. These spells sometimes put cards into other inaccessible zones. Some of these cards, such as Day of Judgment, will destroy all cards of a certain type, but often decks which include such cards will minimize the number of their own cards which will be affected by such cards and thus make the impact for their opponent much greater.
- Unfavorable combat — Many collectible card games involve some form of player interaction generally referred to as "combat"; generally a player pits some of their cards in play (often representing characters or creatures) against their opponent's cards. The result of the combat is often the removal of some cards from play and an advancement of one player's position toward victory. Sometimes a player will be in a situation where they will be forced to unfavorably "trade" their resources in combat to prevent losing the game. For example, a player at a low life total in Magic might find themselves essentially forced to block a large attacking creature with a smaller blocking creature so they do not lose the game. This is colloquially referred to as "chump blocking" (the smaller creature being the "chump"), and causes a loss of card advantage as the small creature will die and the large attacking creature will survive. This is often a desperate measure on the part of the defending player and indicates that player is losing or is playing for time in order to play a card which will improve their chances of winning. Sometimes the defending player will block a single large attacking creature with two or more defending creatures, losing several or all of their creatures in order to get rid of the attacking creature. Occasionally, an attacking player will intentionally engineer the opposite situation, where a defending creature will block and kill one of their creatures without itself dying. This is generally done with the intent of causing as much damage to the defending player as possible as quickly as possible, so as to end the game sooner in victory rather than let the other player play cards which will save them.

Other means of affecting combat can cause one player to gain card advantage. For instance, if one player attacks with a larger creature, and the other player blocks with a smaller creature, the smaller creature will die and the larger creature will survive. If the defending player then plays a card to destroy the larger creature (such as Shock in Magic), they will have traded two cards of their own (the smaller creature and the damage or removal card) for one card of their opponent's (the larger creature), putting their opponent ahead in terms of card advantage.

Another relatively common mode of card advantage generation in Magic is when one player plays an aura spell, an enchantment card which attaches to another card in play. If the card the aura is attached to is destroyed in some manner, then the aura will be placed into that player's discard pile because the aura no longer has anything to enchant. Because many auras are cast on creatures, and creatures are fairly easily destroyed, playing with aura spells often provides a player's opponent the chance to get a "2-for-1" by destroying the creature the aura was attached to with a single card. As such, auras are seldom seen in competitive play unless they have some way of overcoming this inherent weakness.

== Virtual card advantage ==
Virtual card advantage can refer to a number of different situations and effects which, while not providing a direct advantage in the number of cards available, changes the value of the cards available to one or both players. There are four primary forms of virtual card advantage: card selection, recurring effects, tempo and playing such that the opponents cards are no longer as valuable to them.

When Eric “Dinosaur” Taylor originally pitched this concept, it was defined as “card advantage when no one loses cards.” The classic example for this is playing a Moat against an opponent's large number of creatures. Although the cards have not been technically removed from play through a "sweeper" effect, the opponent no longer gains an advantage from the cards they have played because they cannot perform their function as intended.

- Card Selection - allows a player influence over which cards he or she will draw. For example, a card such as Ponder does not directly provide card advantage, as it costs one card to play, and draws one card, netting zero cards. However, as it allows the player to choose the order of the top three cards of their deck before they draw, the value of the drawn card will almost always be significantly higher than the value of a single random card in any given situation. Even in the event of not finding a valuable card, knowing that such a card is not going to be drawn still provides value in that the player can plan for the cards that are available. An extreme form of card selection is 'tutoring', an effect that allows the player to search their entire deck for a specific card and put it into their hand. While this does not provide direct card advantage, as one card is drawn and one card is used, it is obviously extremely advantageous to have access to whatever card is needed.
- Recurring effects - Recurring effects come in many different forms, but all of them give the potential to obtain an effect multiple times for the cost of a single card, thus obtaining more than one card's worth of value. There are an exceptionally wide variety of these effects, ranging from single cards that can be cast multiple times, to cards that once in play can be repeatedly used. Similarly there are cards which allow for other cards to be recurred but provide no value themselves by returning a used card to its owners hand or resetting an ability so it can be used again. In all of these cases, more effects are available than the cards used. Magic: The Gatherings flashback mechanic, for example, allows for one card to be cast twice, obtaining two effects while only costing a single card. Recursive cards normally require the investment of resources other than cards to maintain balance, however some allow the player to trade unhelpful cards in their hand for a repetition of another cards effect. In this case when discarded card is worth less than the effect provided, additional value is gained.
- Tempo - Tempo describes a non-intuitive way to gain card advantage, achieved when a player uses cards faster than their opponent; if a player loses the game with cards in their hand, those cards are "lost", similar to losing them through other more conventional forms of card advantage like removal or discard. Therefore, if one spends their cards winning the game before the opponent can spend their own, they have gained virtual card advantage in the process. In Magic, this is typified by the "Burn" archetype, which uses cheap spells like Lightning Bolt to damage the other player directly, instead of affecting the board state. The burn player is effectively taking an 0-for-1 every time they do this, seemingly generating card disadvantage for themselves, but because they end the game before the other player's cards can affect the board state in a significant way, none of the card advantage their opponent may have had matters. Similarly, a spell like Remand does not generate card advantage one way or another; the tempo player and their opponent both spend a card and replace it. However, if the tempo player has a stronger board (perhaps because their creatures are small and aggressive), this enables them to retain the status quo for longer, shortening the game's length and indirectly gaining them card advantage.
- Denying the opponents cards value - A complex strategy which requires specific card choices to provide value. Value can be removed either through directly affecting the cards themselves, through effects that prevent certain cards being played, or by employing a strategy that the opponents deck cannot interact with. In each case, cards that the opponent has that cannot be used, effectively become 'dead' even though they are still an available resource, thus depriving them of their value but not actually of their cards.

Cards that provide virtual advantage, or that enable cards or effects to be recycled are typically some of the most powerful in any game because virtual advantage is often significantly more powerful than direct card advantage. While having access to a larger number of cards is certainly an advantage, having access to or denying the use of specific cards or effects can be even more so. As all games limit the number of cards of the same name that can be played, having access to any one card just by drawing can require a higher number of draws to achieve than is practical. Also, as cards are a finite resource, simply drawing a large number of them can be disadvantageous as many games force players to discard excess cards at the end of their turn, (and in Magic, running out of cards causes a player to lose the game). As a result, most decks which rely on card advantage to create a winning position (where an opponent runs out of cards in hand to play but the player still has many), use a mix of direct and virtual advantage to ensure that not only do they have cards available to them, but the cards that are available are those they require to win.
