= Special Assignment (TV program) =

Canadian television program

- Genre: Current affairs
- Country of origin: Canada
- Original language: English
- No. of seasons: 1

Production
- Producer: Trina McQueen
- Running time: 5 minutes

Original release
- Network: CBC Television
- Release: 5 January – 25 June 1976

Related
- Viewpoint

Special Assignment is a Canadian current affairs television program that aired on CBC Television in 1976.

== Premise ==
This program featured news analysis from CBC News reporters and was recorded at CBC facilities in different cities.

== Scheduling ==
This five-minute program was broadcast weekdays at 11:22 p.m. (Eastern time) from 5 January to 25 June 1976, following The National.
