= Far sight =

Far sight may refer to:

- Hyperopia, farsightedness
- Farsight, an audio/video conferencing framework
- Farsight Institute, conducts scientific research into remote-viewing
- FarSight Studios, an American video game developer
- Commander Farsight, or O'Shovah, a Tau character from the fictional Warhammer 40,000 universe. His full name is Shas'O Vior'la Shovah Kais Mont'yr.
- Television, derived from mixed Latin and Greek roots, meaning "far sight"
