= Fear Effect Sedna =

2018 video game

- Developer: Sushee
- Publisher: Forever Entertainment
- Series: Fear Effect
- Engine: Unity
- Platforms: Nintendo Switch; PlayStation 4 Windows; Xbox One
- Release: March 6, 2018
- Genres: Role-playing, third-person shooter
- Mode: Single-player

Fear Effect Sedna is an indie isometric video game developed by French studio Sushee and published by Forever Entertainment under license from Square Enix Collective. The game's development was funded via a Kickstarter campaign. It is the third installment in the Fear Effect series, and was released on March 6, 2018, for PlayStation 4, Nintendo Switch, Windows, and Xbox One. The game is a sequel to Fear Effect, which was released in 2000, and was co-written by the first game's writer.

== Reception ==
Reception

Aggregate score
Aggregator	Score
Metacritic	NS: 48/100; PC: 42/100; PS4: 50/100; XONE: 46/100

Review scores
Publication	Score
Destructoid	5/10
Game Informer	2/10
Hardcore Gamer	3.5/5
Nintendo Life	6/10
Nintendo World Report	4/10
Push Square	3/10

Fear Effect Sedna received generally negative reviews from critics upon release.
