= Depiction =

Reference conveyed through pictures

Depiction is reference conveyed through pictures. A picture refers to its object through a non-linguistic two-dimensional scheme, and is distinct from writing or notation. A depictive two-dimensional scheme is called a picture plane and may be constructed according to descriptive geometry, where they are usually divided between projections (orthogonal and various oblique angles) and perspectives (according to number of vanishing points).

Pictures are made with various materials and techniques, such as painting, drawing, or prints (including photography and movies) mosaics, tapestries, stained glass, and collages of unusual and disparate elements. Occasionally, picture-like features may be recognised in simple inkblots, accidental stains, peculiar clouds or a glimpse of the moon, but these are special cases, and it is controversial whether they count as genuine instances of depiction. Similarly, sculpture and theatrical performances are sometimes said to depict, but this requires a broad understanding of 'depict', as simply designating a form of representation that is not linguistic or notational. The bulk of studies of depiction however deal only with pictures. While sculpture and performance clearly represent or refer, they do not strictly picture their objects.

Objects pictured may be factual or fictional, literal or metaphorical, realistic or idealised and in various combination. Idealised depiction is also termed schematic or stylised and extends to icons, diagrams and maps. Classes or styles of picture may abstract their objects by degrees, conversely, establish degrees of the concrete (usually called, a little confusingly, figuration or figurative, since the 'figurative' is then often quite literal). Stylisation can lead to the fully abstract picture, where reference is only to conditions for a picture plane – a severe exercise in self-reference and ultimately a sub-set of pattern.

But just how pictures function remains controversial. Philosophers, art historians and critics, perceptual psychologists and other researchers in the arts and social sciences have contributed to the debate and many of the most influential contributions have been interdisciplinary. Some key positions are briefly surveyed below.

== Resemblance ==
Traditionally, depiction is distinguished from denotative meaning by the presence of a mimetic element or resemblance. A picture resembles its object in a way a word or sound does not. Resemblance is no guarantee of depiction, obviously. Two pens may resemble one another but do not therefore depict each other. To say a picture resembles its object especially is only to say that its object is that which it especially resembles; which strictly begins with the picture itself. Indeed, since everything resembles something in some way, mere resemblance as a distinguishing trait is trivial. Moreover, depiction is no guarantee of resemblance to an object. A picture of a dragon does not resemble an actual dragon. So resemblance is not enough.

Theories have tried either to set further conditions to the kind of resemblance necessary, or sought ways in which a notational system might allow such resemblance. It is widely believed that the problem with a resemblance theory of depiction is that resemblance is a symmetrical relation between terms (necessarily, if x resembles y, then y resembles x) while in contrast depiction is at best a non-symmetrical relation (it is not necessary that, if x depicts y, y depicts x). If this is right, then depiction and resemblance cannot be identified, and a resemblance theory of depiction is forced to offer a more complicated explanation, for example by relying on experienced resemblance instead, which clearly is an asymmetrical notion (that you experience x as resembling y does not mean you also experience y as resembling x). Others have argued, however, that the concept of resemblance is not exclusively a relational notion, and so that the initial problem is merely apparent.

In art history, the history of actual attempts to achieve resemblance in depictions is usually covered under the terms "realism", naturalism", or "illusionism".

== Illusion ==
The most famous and elaborate case for resemblance modified by reference, is made by art historian Ernst Gombrich. Resemblance in pictures is taken to involve illusion. Instincts in visual perception are said to be triggered or alerted by pictures, even when we are rarely deceived. The eye supposedly cannot resist finding resemblances that accord with illusion. Resemblance is thus narrowed to something like the seeds of illusion. Against the one-way relation of reference Gombrich argues for a weaker or labile relation, inherited from substitution. Pictures are thus both more primitive and powerful than stricter reference.

But whether a picture can deceive a little while it represents as much seems gravely compromised. Claims for innate dispositions in sight are also contested. Gombrich appeals to an array of psychological research from James J. Gibson, R. L. Gregory, John M. Kennedy, Konrad Lorenz, Ulric Neisser and others in arguing for an 'optical' basis to perspective, in particular (see also perspective (graphical). Subsequent cross-cultural studies in depictive competence and related studies in child-development and vision impairment are inconclusive at best.

Gombrich's convictions have important implications for his popular history of art, for treatment and priorities there. In a later study by John Willats (1997) on the variety and development of picture planes, Gombrich's views on the greater realism of perspective underpin many crucial findings.

== Dual invariants ==
A more frankly behaviouristic view is taken by the perceptual psychologist James J. Gibson, partly in response to Gombrich. Gibson treats visual perception as the eye registering necessary information for behaviour in a given environment. The information is filtered from light rays that meet the retina. The light is called the stimulus energy or sensation. The information consists of underlying patterns or 'invariants' for vital features to the environment.

Gibson's view of depiction concerns the re-presentation of these invariants. In the case of illusions or trompe l'oeil, the picture also conveys the stimulus energy, but generally the experience is of perceiving two sets of invariants, one for the picture surface, another for the object pictured. He pointedly rejects any seeds of illusion or substitution and allows that a picture represents when two sets of invariants are displayed. But invariants tell us little more than that the resemblance is visible, dual invariants only that the terms of reference are the same as those for resemblance

== Seeing-in ==
A similar duality is proposed by the philosopher of art Richard Wollheim. He calls it 'twofoldness'. Our experience of the picture surface is called the 'configurational' aspect, and our experience of the object depicted the 'recognitional'. Wollheim's main claim is that we are simultaneously aware of both the surface and the depicted object. The concept of twofoldness has been very influential in contemporary analytic aesthetics, especially in the writings of Dominic Lopes and of Bence Nanay. Again, illusion is forestalled by the prominence of the picture surface where an object is depicted. Yet the object depicted quite simply is the picture surface under one reading, the surface indifferent to picture, another. The two are hardly compatible or simultaneous. Nor do they ensure a reference relation.

Wollheim introduces the concept of 'seeing-in' to qualify depictive resemblance. Seeing-in is a psychological disposition to detect a resemblance between certain surfaces, such as inkblots or accidental stains, etc. and three-dimensional objects. The eye is not deceived, but finds or projects some resemblance to the surface. This is not quite depiction, since the resemblance is only incidental to the surface. The surface does not strictly refer to such objects. Seeing-in is a necessary condition to depiction, and sufficient when in accordance with the maker's intentions, where these are clear from certain features to a picture. But seeing-in cannot really say in what way such surfaces resemble objects either, only specify where they perhaps first occur.

Wollheim's account of how a resemblance is agreed or modified, whereby maker and user anticipate each other's roles, does not really explain how a resemblance refers, but rather when an agreed resemblance obtains.

== Other psychological resources ==
The appeal to broader psychological factors in qualifying depictive resemblance is echoed in the theories of philosophers such as Robert Hopkins, Flint Schier and Kendall Walton. They enlist 'experience', 'recognition' and 'imagination' respectively. Each provides additional factors to an understanding or interpretation of pictorial reference, although none can explain how a picture resembles an object (if indeed it does), nor how this resemblance is then also a reference.

For example, Schier returns to the contrast with language to try to identify a crucial difference in depictive competence. Understanding a pictorial style does not depend upon learning a vocabulary and syntax. Once grasped, a style allows the recognition of any object known to the user. Of course recognition allows a great deal more than that – books teaching children to read often introduce them to many exotic creatures such as a kangaroo or armadillo through illustrations. Many fictions and caricatures are promptly recognised without prior acquaintance of either a particular style or the object in question. So competence cannot rely on a simple index or synonymy for objects and styles.

Schier's conclusion that lack of syntax and semantics in reference then qualifies as depiction, leaves dance, architecture, animation, sculpture and music all sharing the same mode of reference. This perhaps points as much to limitations in a linguistic model.

== Notation ==
Reversing orthodoxy, the philosopher Nelson Goodman starts from reference and attempts to assimilate resemblance. He denies resemblance as either necessary or sufficient condition for depiction but surprisingly, allows that it arises and fluctuates as a matter of usage or familiarity.

For Goodman, a picture denotes. Denotation is divided between description, covering writing and extending to more discursive notation including music and dance scores, to depiction at greatest remove. However, a word does not grow to resemble its object, no matter how familiar or preferred. To explain how a pictorial notation does, Goodman proposes an analogue system, consisting of undifferentiated characters, a density of syntax and semantics and relative repleteness of syntax. These requirements taken in combination mean that a one-way reference running from picture to object encounters a problem. If its semantics is undifferentiated, then the relation flows back from object to picture. Depiction can acquire resemblance but must surrender reference. This is a point tacitly acknowledged by Goodman, conceding firstly that density is the antithesis of notation and later that lack of differentiation may actually permit resemblance. A denotation without notation lacks sense.

Nevertheless, Goodman's framework is revisited by philosopher John Kulvicki and applied by art historian James Elkins to an array of hybrid artefacts, combining picture, pattern and notation.

== Pictorial semiotics ==
Pictorial semiotics aims for just the kind of integration of depiction with notation undertaken by Goodman, but fails to identify his requirements for syntax and semantics. It seeks to apply the model of structural linguistics, to reveal core meanings and permutations for pictures of all kinds, but stalls in identifying constituent elements of reference, or as semioticians prefer, 'signification'. Similarly, they accept resemblance although call it 'iconicity' (after Charles Sanders Peirce, 1931–58) and are uncomfortable in qualifying its role. Older practitioners, such as Roland Barthes and Umberto Eco variously shift analysis to underlying 'connotations' for an object depicted or concentrate on description of purported content at the expense of more medium-specific meaning. Essentially they establish a more general iconography.

A later adherent, Göran Sonesson, rejects Goodman's terms for syntax and semantics as alien to linguistics, no more than an ideal and turns instead to the findings of perceptual psychologists, such as J. M. Kennedy, N. H. Freeman and David Marr in order to detect underlying structure. Sonesson accepts 'seeing-in', although prefers Edmund Husserl's version. Resemblance is again grounded in optics or the visible, although this does not exclude writing nor reconcile resemblance with reference. Discussion tends to be restricted to the function of outlines in schemes for depth.

== Deixis ==
The art historian Norman Bryson persists with a linguistic model and advances a detail of parsing and tense, 'deixis'. He rejects resemblance and illusion as incompatible with the ambiguities and interpretation available to pictures and is also critical of the inflexible nature of structuralist analysis. Deixis is taken as the rhetoric of the narrator, indicating the presence of the speaker in a discourse, a bodily or physical aspect as well as an explicit temporal dimension. In depiction this translates as a difference between 'The Gaze' where deixis is absent and 'The Glance' where it is present. Where present, details to materials indicate how long and in what way the depiction was made, where absent, a telling suppression or prolonging of the act. The distinction attempts to account for the 'plastic' or medium-specific qualities absent from earlier semiotic analyses and somewhat approximates the 'indexic' aspect to signs introduced by Peirce.

Deixis offers a more elaborate account of the picture surface and broad differences to expression and application but cannot qualify resemblance.

== Iconography ==
Lastly, iconography is the study of pictorial content, mainly in art, and would seem to ignore the question of how to concentrate upon what. But iconography's findings take a rather recondite view of content, are often based on subtle literary, historical and cultural allusion and highlight a sharp difference in terms of resemblance, optical accuracy or intuitive illusion. Resemblance is hardly direct or spontaneous for the iconographer, reference rarely to the literal or singular. Visual perception here is subject to reflection and research, the object as much reference as referent.

The distinguished art historian Erwin Panofsky allowed three levels to iconography. The first is 'natural' content, the object recognised or resembling without context, on a second level, a modifying historical and cultural context and at a third, deeper level, a fundamental structure or ideology (called iconology). He even ascribed the use of perspective a deep social meaning (1927). However more recently, a natural or neutral level tends to be abandoned as mythical. The cultural scholar W. J. T. Mitchell looks to ideology to determine resemblance and depiction as acknowledgement of shifts in relations there, albeit by an unspecified scheme or notation.

Iconography points to differences in scope for a theory of depiction. Where stylistics and a basic object is nominated, resemblance is prominent, but where more elaborate objects are encountered, or terms for nature denied, simple perception or notation flounder. The difference corresponds somewhat to the division in philosophy between the analytic and continental.

== Other issues ==
Dozens of factors influence depictions and how they are represented. These include the equipment used to create the depiction, the creator's intent, vantage point, mobility, proximity, publication format, among others, and, when dealing with human subjects, their potential desire for impression management.

Other debates about the nature of depiction include the relationship between seeing something in a picture and seeing face to face, whether depictive representation is conventional, how understanding novel depictions is possible, the aesthetic and ethical value of depiction and the nature of realism in pictorial art.

== See also ==
- Figurative art
- Representationalism
- Symbol
