= Convergence of parallel lines =

Convergence of parallel lines can refer to:

- In everyday life, the vanishing point phenomenon
- Non-Euclidean geometry in which Euclid's parallel postulate does not hold
