= Willats =

Willats is a surname. Notable people with the surname include:

- John Willats (died 2006), British psychologist and artist
- Stephen Willats (born 1943), British artist
