= Projection plane =

Surface used in generating a graphical projection of a three-dimensional object

A projection plane, or plane of projection, is a type of view in which graphical projections from an object intersect. Projection planes are used often in descriptive geometry and graphical representation. A picture plane in perspective drawing is a type of projection plane.

With perspective drawing, the lines of sight, or projection lines, between an object and a picture plane return to a vanishing point and are not parallel. With parallel projection the lines of sight from the object to the projection plane are parallel.

Perspective projection of triangle ABC on plane Π from point S.

Axonometric projection on projection plane Π

A cube in two-point perspective

Simulated rays of light travel from the object, through the projection plane, and to the viewer's eye or camera. This is the basis for graphical perspective.

Various graphical projections and how they are produced

== See also ==
- Image plane
- Picture plane
