= Stereoscopic spectroscopy =

Imaging spectroscopy type

Stereoscopic spectroscopy is a type of imaging spectroscopy that can extract a few spectral parameters over a complete image plane simultaneously. A stereoscopic spectrograph is similar to a normal spectrograph except that (A) it has no slit, and (B) multiple spectral orders (often including the non-dispersed zero order) are collected simultaneously. The individual images are blurred by the spectral information present in the original data. The images are recombined using stereoscopic algorithms similar to those used to find ground feature altitudes from parallax in aerial photography.

Stereoscopic spectroscopy is a special case of the more general field of tomographic spectroscopy. Both types of imaging use an analogy between the $(x,y,\lambda)$ data space of imaging spectrographs and the conventional $(x,y,z)$ 3-space of the physical world. Each spectral order in the instrument produces an image plane analogous to the view from a camera with a particular look angle through the $(x,y,\lambda)$ data space, and recombining the views allows recovery of (some aspects of) the spectrum at every location in the image.
