= Vanishing point =

Artistic concept relating to perspective

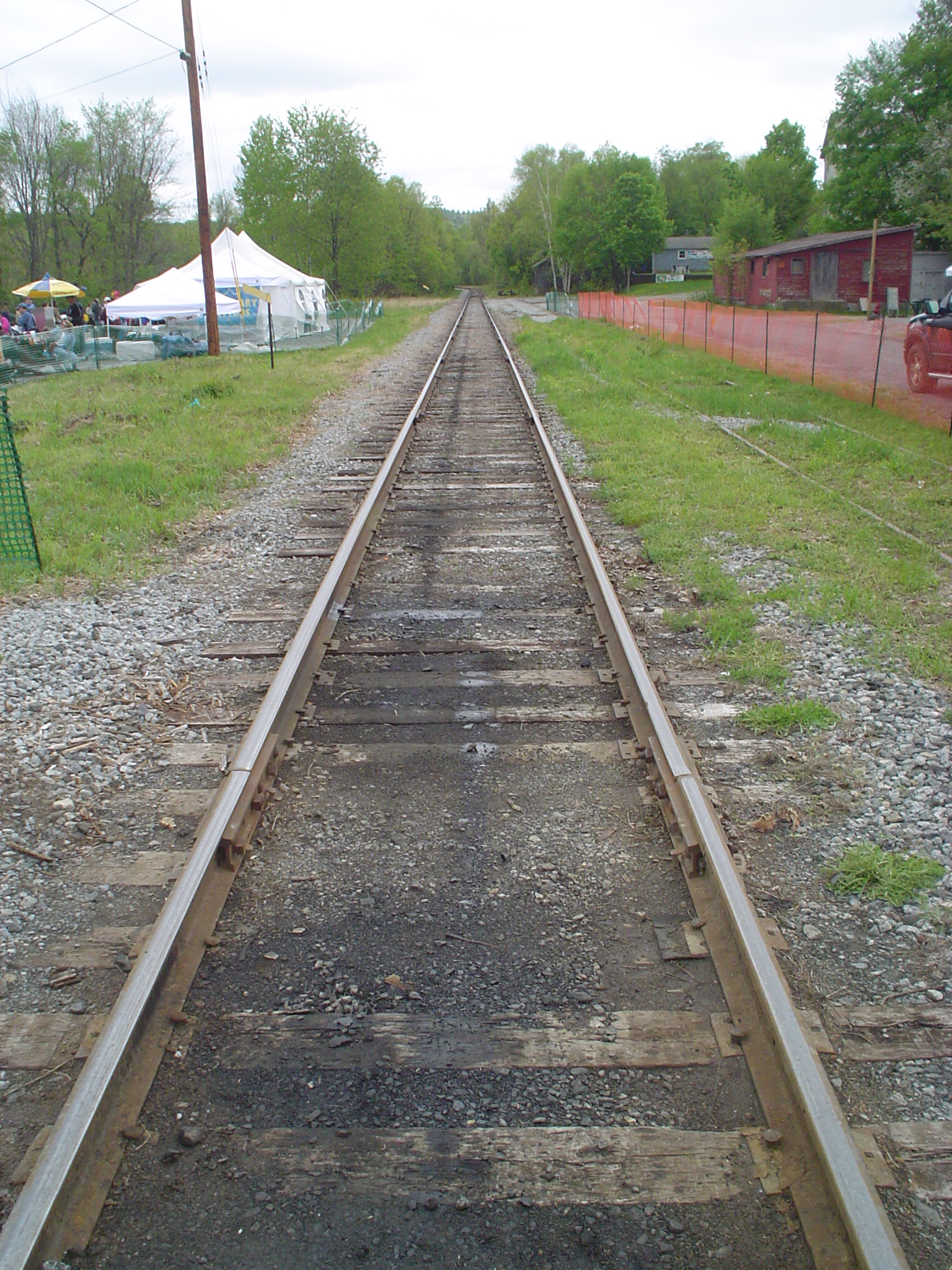
A photo demonstrating a vanishing point at the end of the railroad.

A vanishing point is a point on the image plane of a perspective rendering where the two-dimensional perspective projections of parallel lines in three-dimensional space appear to converge. When the set of parallel lines is perpendicular to a picture plane, the construction is known as one-point perspective, and their vanishing point corresponds to the oculus, or "eye point", from which the image should be viewed for correct perspective geometry. Traditional linear drawings use objects with one to three sets of parallels, defining one to three vanishing points.

Italian humanist polymath and architect Leon Battista Alberti first introduced the concept in his treatise on perspective in art, De pictura, written in 1435. Straight railroad tracks are a familiar modern example.

== Vector notation ==
A 2D construction of perspective viewing, showing the formation of a vanishing point

The vanishing point may also be referred to as the "direction point", as lines having the same directional vector, say D, will have the same vanishing point. Mathematically, let q ≡ (x, y, f) be a point lying on the image plane, where f is the focal length (of the camera associated with the image), and let v_{q} ≡ (x/h, y/h, f/h) be the unit vector associated with q, where h = √x^{2} + y^{2} + f^{2}. If we consider a straight line in space S with the unit vector n_{s} ≡ (n_{x}, n_{y}, n_{z}) and its vanishing point v_{s}, the unit vector associated with v_{s} is equal to n_{s}, assuming both point towards the image plane.

When the image plane is parallel to two world-coordinate axes, lines parallel to the axis that is cut by this image plane will have images that meet at a single vanishing point. Lines parallel to the other two axes will not form vanishing points as they are parallel to the image plane. This is one-point perspective. Similarly, when the image plane intersects two world-coordinate axes, lines parallel to those planes will meet form two vanishing points in the picture plane. This is called two-point perspective. In three-point perspective the image plane intersects the x, y, and z axes and therefore lines parallel to these axes intersect, resulting in three different vanishing points.

== Theorem ==
The vanishing point theorem is the principal theorem in the science of perspective. It says that the image in a picture plane π of a line L in space, not parallel to the picture, is determined by its intersection with π and its vanishing point. Some authors have used the phrase, "the image of a line includes its vanishing point". Guidobaldo del Monte gave several verifications, and Humphry Ditton called the result the "main and Great Proposition". Brook Taylor wrote the first book in English on perspective in 1714, which introduced the term "vanishing point" and was the first to fully explain the geometry of multipoint perspective, and historian Kirsti Andersen compiled these observations. She notes, in terms of projective geometry, the vanishing point is the image of the point at infinity associated with L, as the sightline from O through the vanishing point is parallel to L.

== Vanishing line ==
As a vanishing point originates in a line, so a vanishing line originates in a plane α that is not parallel to the picture π. Given the eye point O, and β the plane parallel to α and lying on O, then the vanishing line of α is β ∩ π. For example, when α is the ground plane and β is the horizon plane, then the vanishing line of α is the horizon line β ∩ π.

To put it simply, the vanishing line of some plane, say α, is obtained by the intersection of the image plane with another plane, say β, parallel to the plane of interest (α), passing through the camera center. For different sets of lines parallel to this plane α, their respective vanishing points will lie on this vanishing line. The horizon line is a theoretical line that represents the eye level of the observer. If the object is below the horizon line, its lines angle up to the horizon line. If the object is above, they slope down.

== Properties ==
1. Projections of two sets of parallel lines lying in some plane π_{A} appear to converge, i.e. the vanishing point associated with that pair, on a horizon line, or vanishing line H formed by the intersection of the image plane with the plane parallel to π_{A} and passing through the pinhole. Proof: Consider the ground plane π, as y = c which is, for the sake of simplicity, orthogonal to the image plane. Also, consider a line L that lies in the plane π, which is defined by the equation ax + bz = d. Using perspective pinhole projections, a point on L projected on the image plane will have coordinates defined as,

x′ = f·x/z = f·(d − bz)/az
y′ = f·y/z = f·c/z

This is the parametric representation of the image L′ of the line L with z as the parameter. When z → −∞ it stops at the point (x′,y′) = (−fb/a,0) on the x′ axis of the image plane. This is the vanishing point corresponding to all parallel lines with slope −b/a in the plane π. All vanishing points associated with different lines with different slopes belonging to plane π will lie on the x′ axis, which in this case is the horizon line.

2. Let A, B, and C be three mutually orthogonal straight lines in space and v_{A} ≡ (x_{A}, y_{A}, f), v_{B} ≡ (x_{B}, y_{B}, f), v_{C} ≡ (x_{C}, y_{C}, f) be the three corresponding vanishing points respectively. If we know the coordinates of one of these points, say v_{A}, and the direction of a straight line on the image plane, which passes through a second point, say v_{B}, we can compute the coordinates of both v_{B} and v_{C}

3. Let A, B, and C be three mutually orthogonal straight lines in space and v_{A} ≡ (x_{A}, y_{A}, f), v_{B} ≡ (x_{B}, y_{B}, f), v_{C} ≡ (x_{C}, y_{C}, f) be the three corresponding vanishing points respectively. The orthocenter of the triangle with vertices in the three vanishing points is the intersection of the optical axis and the image plane.

== Curvilinear and reverse perspective ==
A curvilinear perspective is a drawing with either 4 or 5 vanishing points. In 5-point perspective the vanishing points are mapped into a circle with 4 vanishing points at the cardinal headings N, W, S, E and one at the circle's origin.

A reverse perspective is a drawing with vanishing points that are placed outside the painting with the illusion that they are "in front of" the painting.

Single point perspective projection

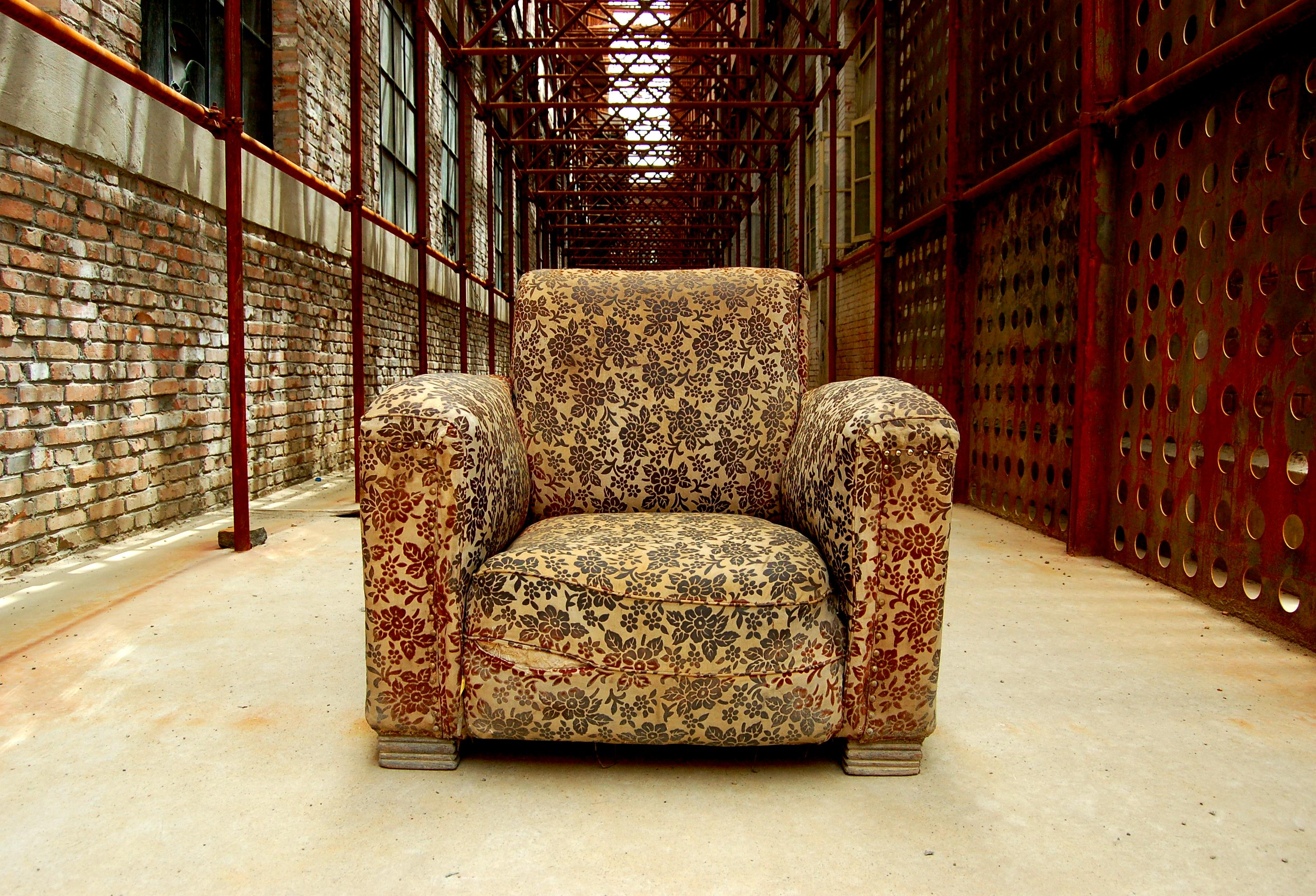
Single point perspective in photography

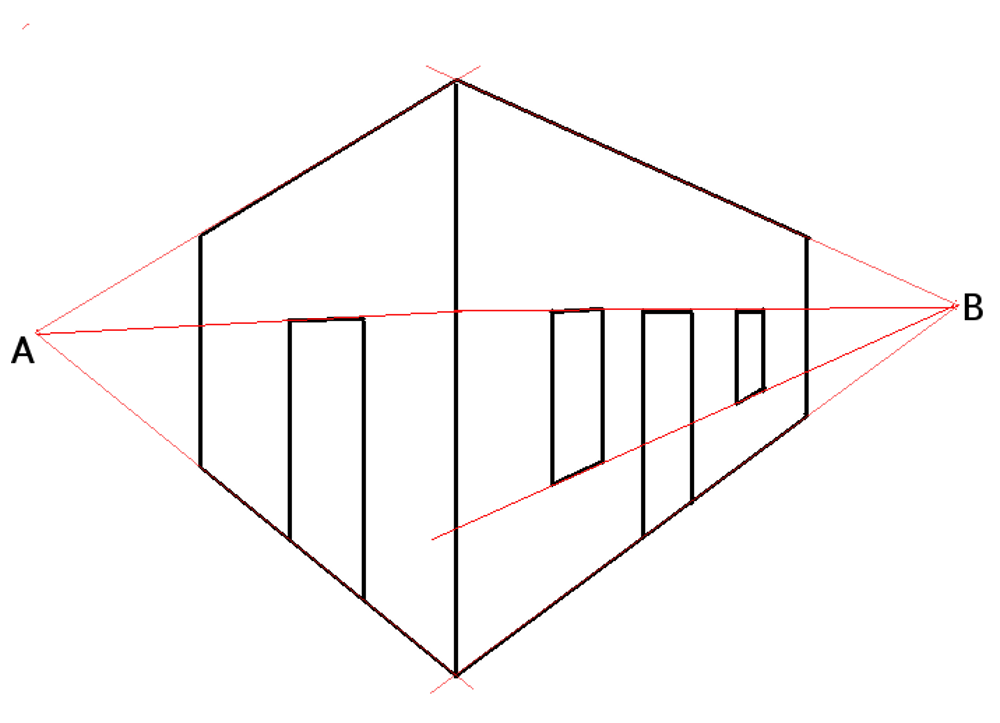
Double point perspective projection

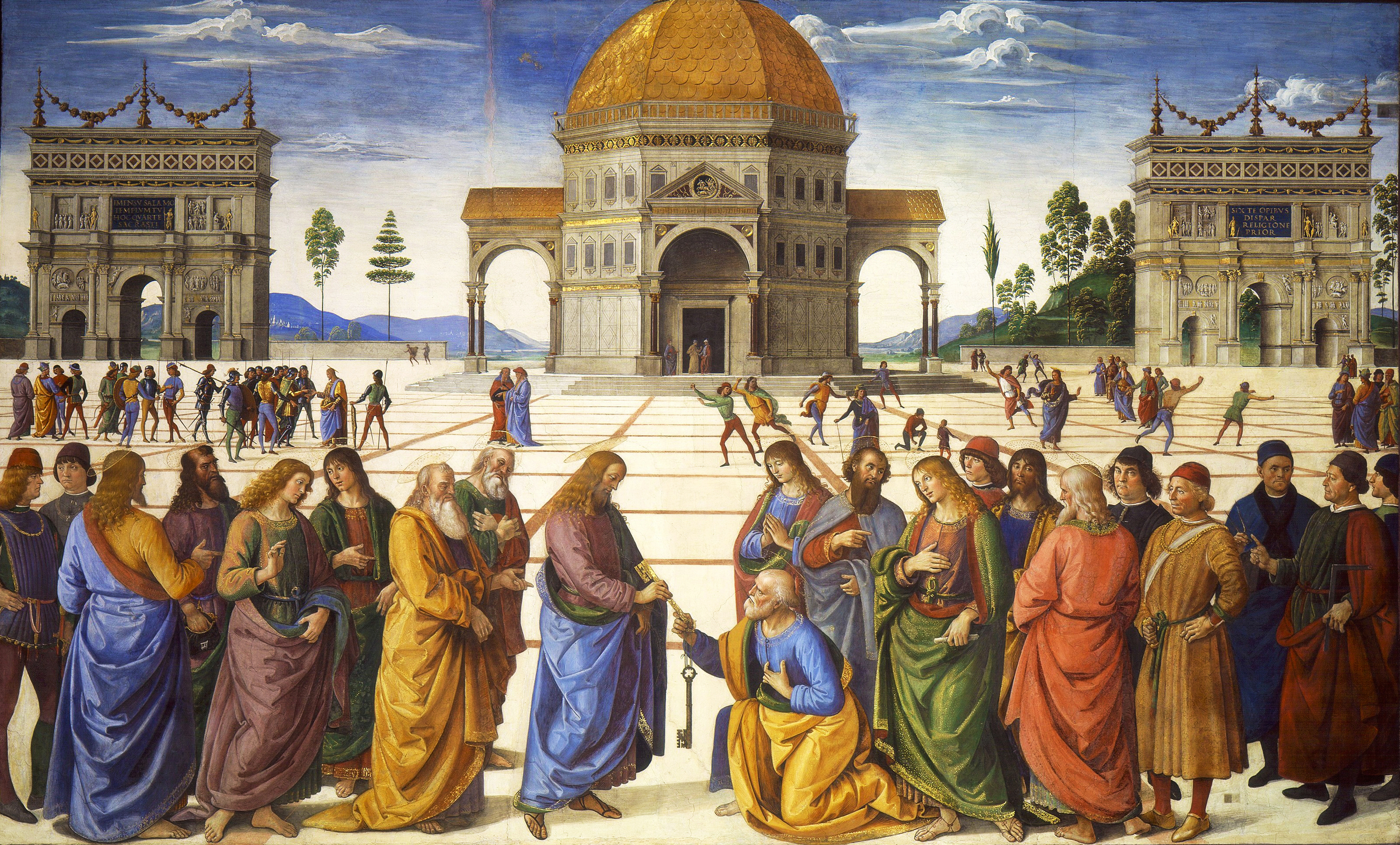
Pietro Perugino's use of perspective in the Delivery of the Keys fresco at the Sistine Chapel (1481–82) helped bring the Renaissance to Rome.

== Detection ==
Several methods for vanishing point detection make use of the line segments detected in images. Other techniques involve considering the intensity gradients of the image pixels directly.

There are significantly large numbers of vanishing points present in an image. Therefore, the aim is to detect the vanishing points that correspond to the principal directions of a scene. This is generally achieved in two steps. The first step, called the accumulation step, as the name suggests, clusters the line segments with the assumption that a cluster will have a common vanishing point. The next step finds the principal clusters present in the scene and therefore it is called the search step.

In the accumulation step, the image is mapped onto a bounded space called the accumulator space. The accumulator space is partitioned into units called cells. Barnard assumed this space to be a Gaussian sphere centered on the optical center of the camera as an accumulator space. A line segment on the image corresponds to a great circle on this sphere, and the vanishing point in the image is mapped to a point. The Gaussian sphere has accumulator cells that increase when a great circle passes through them, i.e. in the image a line segment intersects the vanishing point. Several modifications have been made since, but one of the most efficient techniques was using the Hough Transform, mapping the parameters of the line segment to the bounded space. Cascaded Hough Transforms have been applied for multiple vanishing points.

The process of mapping from the image to the bounded spaces causes the loss of the actual distances between line segments and points.

In the search step, the accumulator cell with the maximum number of line segments passing through it is found. This is followed by removal of those line segments, and the search step is repeated until this count goes below a certain threshold. As more computing power is now available, points corresponding to two or three mutually orthogonal directions can be found.

== Applications ==
Use of cross-ratios in projective geometry to measure real-world dimensions of features depicted in a perspective projection. A, B, C, D and V are points on the image, their separation given in pixels; A', B', C' and D' are in the real world, their separation in metres.: 1. / The width of the side street, W is computed from the known widths of the adjacent shops.; 2. / As a vanishing point, V is visible, the width of only one shop is needed.

1. Camera calibration: The vanishing points of an image contain important information for camera calibration. Various calibration techniques have been introduced using the properties of vanishing points to find intrinsic and extrinsic calibration parameters.
2. 3D reconstruction: A man-made environment has two main characteristics – several lines in the scene are parallel, and a number of edges present are orthogonal. Vanishing points aid in comprehending the environment. Using sets of parallel lines in the plane, the orientation of the plane can be calculated using vanishing points. Torre and Coelho performed extensive investigation in the use of vanishing points to implement a full system. With the assumption that the environment consists of objects with only parallel or perpendicular sides, also called Lego-land, using vanishing points constructed in a single image of the scene they recovered the 3D geometry of the scene. Similar ideas are also used in the field of robotics, mainly in navigation and autonomous vehicles, and in areas concerned with object detection.

== See also ==
- Graphical projection
