= Picture plane =

Image plane located between an eye point and an object

In painting, photography, graphical perspective and descriptive geometry, a picture plane is an image plane located between the "eye point" (or oculus) and the object being viewed. It is usually coextensive to the material surface of the artwork. It is ordinarily a vertical plane perpendicular to the sightline to the object of interest.

== Features ==
In the technique of graphical perspective the picture plane has several features:

Given are an eye point O (from oculus), a horizontal plane of reference called the ground plane γ and a picture plane π... The line of intersection of π and γ is called the ground line and denoted GR. ... the orthogonal projection of O upon π is called the principal vanishing point P...The line through P parallel to the ground line is called the horizon HZ

The horizon frequently features vanishing points of lines appearing parallel in the foreground.

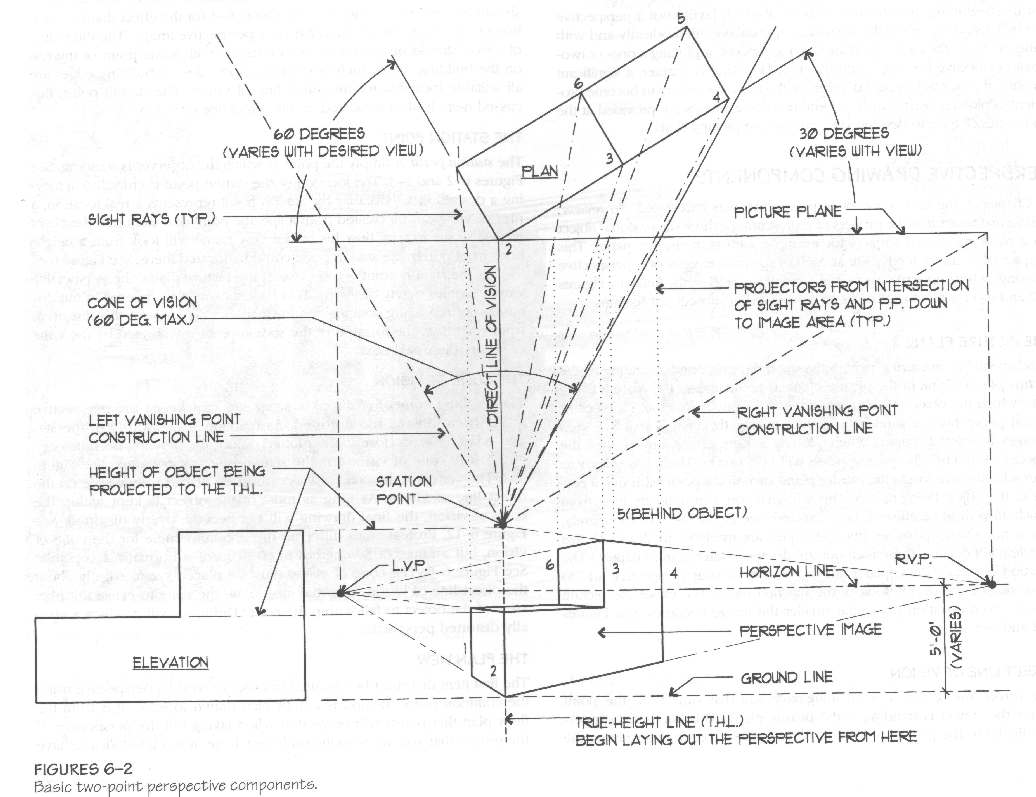
The technique for creating a basic two-point perspective drawing, including the sight rays, the picture plane, the left and right vanishing point construction lines, the horizon line, and the ground line

== Position ==
The orientation of the picture plane is always perpendicular of the axis that comes straight out of your eyes. For example, if you are looking to a building that is in front of you and your eyesight is entirely horizontal then the picture plane is perpendicular to the ground and to the axis of your sight.

If you are looking up or down, then the picture plane remains perpendicular to your sight and it changes the 90 degrees angle compared to the ground. When this happens a third vanishing point will appear in most cases depending on what you are seeing (or drawing).

== Cut of an eject ==
G. B. Halsted included the picture plane in his book Synthetic Projective Geometry: "To 'project' from a fixed point M (the 'projection vertex') a figure, the 'original', composed of points B, C, D etc. and straights b, c, d etc., is to construct the 'projecting straights' $\overline{MB},\ \overline{MC},\ \overline{MD},$ and the 'projecting planes' $\overline{Mb},\ \overline{Mc},\ \overline{Md}.$ Thus is obtained a new figure composed of straights and planes, all on M, and called an 'eject' of the original."

"To 'cut' by a fixed plane μ (the picture-plane) a figure, the 'subject' made up of planes β, γ, δ, etc., and straights b, c, d, etc., is to construct the meets $\overline{\mu \beta},\ \overline{\mu \gamma},\ \overline{\mu \delta}$ and passes $\dot{\mu b},\ \dot{\mu c},\ \dot{\mu d}.$ Thus is obtained a new figure composed of straights and points, all on μ, and called a 'cut' of the subject. If the subject is an eject of an original, the cut of the subject is an 'image' of the original.

== Integrity of the picture plane ==
A well-known phrase has accompanied many discussions of painting during the period of modernism. Coined by the influential art critic Clement Greenberg in his essay called "Modernist Painting", the phrase "integrity of the picture plane" has come to denote how the flat surface of the physical painting functions in older as opposed to more recent works. That phrase is found in the following sentence in his essay:

"The Old Masters had sensed that it was necessary to preserve what is called the integrity of the picture plane: that is, to signify the enduring presence of flatness underneath and above the most vivid illusion of three-dimensional space."

Greenberg seems to be referring to the way painting relates to the picture plane in both the modern period and the "Old Master" period.

== See also ==
- Image plane
- Perspective projection
- Projection plane
