= John Willats =

Drawing psychologist

- Occupations: Psychologist, Sculptor

Academic background
- Education: Royal College of Art

Academic work
- Institutions: Loughborough University University of Birmingham Polytechnic of East London

John Willats (died April 2006) was a British psychologist and artist known for his research on pictorial systems of depiction and perspective, which included a taxonomy of the methods of visual projection used by various artists. He was considered an expert on children's drawings and how children develop drawing abilities.

== Biography ==
Willats studied sculpture at the Royal College of Art. He had degrees in mechanical sciences and psychology. He worked under the supervision of Richard Wollheim at London University. He was teaching sculpture and drawing at Walthamstow School of Art when along with Fred Dubery, he published his first book, Drawing Systems Willats was an Honorary Research Fellow at the Polytechnic of East London and was an Honorary Research Fellow of the University of Birmingham. He was a professor at Loughborough University.

In 2000, Willats completed a sculpture celebrating the millennium in a former hometown of Bradford-on-Avon, England. The sculpture is a life-sized representation of a mill girl, known as "Millie", that celebrates the town's history.

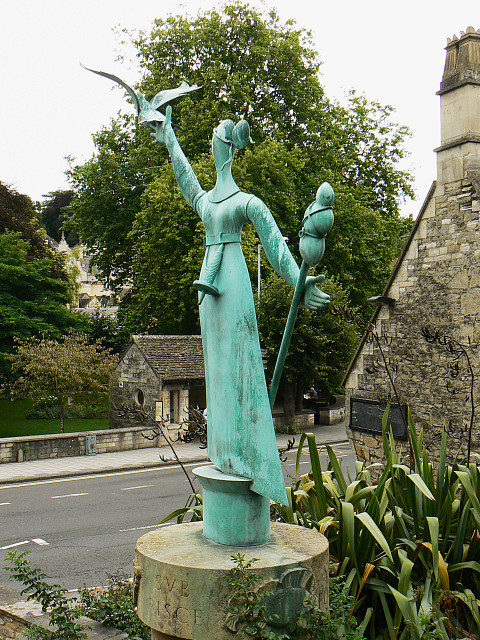
Willats's millennium statue 'Millie' in Bradford on Avon

== Research ==
In Perspective and other drawing systems (1983), Willats and Dubery defined formal categories for pictorial systems, which they called projection systems. Willats posited that people have an innate capability to understand the grammar of pictorial depictions, which is related to Chomsky's theory of universal grammar. In Making sense of children's drawings, Willats proposed that children learn drawing in a manner comparable to language learning, by picking up increasingly complex rules of depiction.

== Books ==
- Dubery, F. & Willats, J. (1972). Drawing systems. Studio Vista.
- Dubery, F. & Willats, J. (1983). Perspective and other drawing systems. The Hubert Press.
- Willats, J. (1997). Art and representation: New principles in the analysis of pictures. Princeton University Press.
- Willats, J. (2006). Making sense of children's drawings. Psychology Press.

== Representative papers ==
- Willats, J. (1977). How children learn to draw realistic pictures. Quarterly Journal of Experimental Psychology, 29(3), 367–382.
- Willats, J. (1981). What do the marks in the picture stand for? The child's acquisition of systems of transformation and denotation. Review of Research in Visual Arts Education, 7(1), 18–33.
- Willats, J. (1987). Marr and pictures: an information-processing account of children's drawings. Archives de Psychologie, 55(213), 105–125.
- Willats, J. (1992). The representation of extendedness in children's drawings of sticks and discs. Child Development, 63(3), 692–710.
- Willats, J., & Durand, F. (2005). Defining pictorial style: Lessons from linguistics and computer graphics. Axiomathes, 15(3), 319–351.
