= Image plane =

3D digital image view

In 3D computer graphics, the image plane, also called screen space, is that plane in the world which corresponds to the display monitor used to view the image that is being rendered. If one makes the analogy of taking a photograph to rendering a 3D image, the surface of the film (or the image sensor) is the image plane. In this case, the viewing transformation is a projection that maps the world onto the image plane. A rectangular region of this plane, called the viewing window or viewport, maps to the monitor. This establishes the mapping between pixels on the monitor and points (or rather, rays) in the 3D world. The plane is not usually an actual geometric object in a 3D scene, but instead is usually a collection of target coordinates or dimensions that are used during the rasterization process so the final output can be displayed as intended on the physical screen.

In optics, the image plane is the plane that contains the object's projected image, and lies beyond the back focal plane.

== See also ==
- Film plane
- Focal plane
- Picture plane
- Projection plane
- Real image
