= Station point =

A station point is a location or vantage point from which an artist or exhibitor intends an observer to experience an artwork.

In photography, the station point is the location of the camera at the point in time when the camera records a view to a recording medium.

In traditional graphical perspective, oculus (abbreviated O) denotes the point in space where a viewer sees a scene to be portrayed on a picture plane. When depiction of a scene is taken over by a camera with photography, the "eye point" or oculus becomes the station point.

== See also ==
- Art
- Art exhibition
