= Norman Bryson =

American art historian

William Norman Bryson (born 1949) is an Anglo American art historian who authored several major works that were particularly influential in the 1980s and 1990s. He graduated with a Ph.D. from Cambridge University in 1977, and subsequently worked as a professor at King's College until 1988, when he moved to Rochester, NY. There, he worked for two years at the University of Rochester before moving to Harvard University in 1990. In a shift from that earlier period, he now is faculty at University of California, San Diego, and primarily writes about contemporary art, such as Sharon Lockhart. His career is characterized by a move to a more literary theory-based approach to art history, including Word and Image: French Painting of the Ancien Régime (1983), Vision and Painting: The Logic of the Gaze (1986), and Tradition and Desire: From David to Delacroix (1987). He was awarded a Guggenheim Fellowship in 1997.

== Works ==
- The Swimmer & Other Poems (1969)
- Word and Image: French Painting in the Ancien Regime (1981)
- Vision and Painting: The Logic of the Gaze (1983)
- Tradition and Desire: From David to Delacroix (1984)
- The Logic of the Gaze (1986)
- Visual Theory: Painting and Interpretation (1989)
- Looking at the Overlooked: Four Essays on Still Life Painting (1990)
- In Medusa's Gaze: Still Life Paintings From Upstate New York Museums (1991)
- Visual Culture: Images and Interpretations (1993)
- Inside/ Out: New Chinese Art (1998)
