= Perspective (graphical) =

Form of graphical projection where the projection lines converge to one or more points

External videos
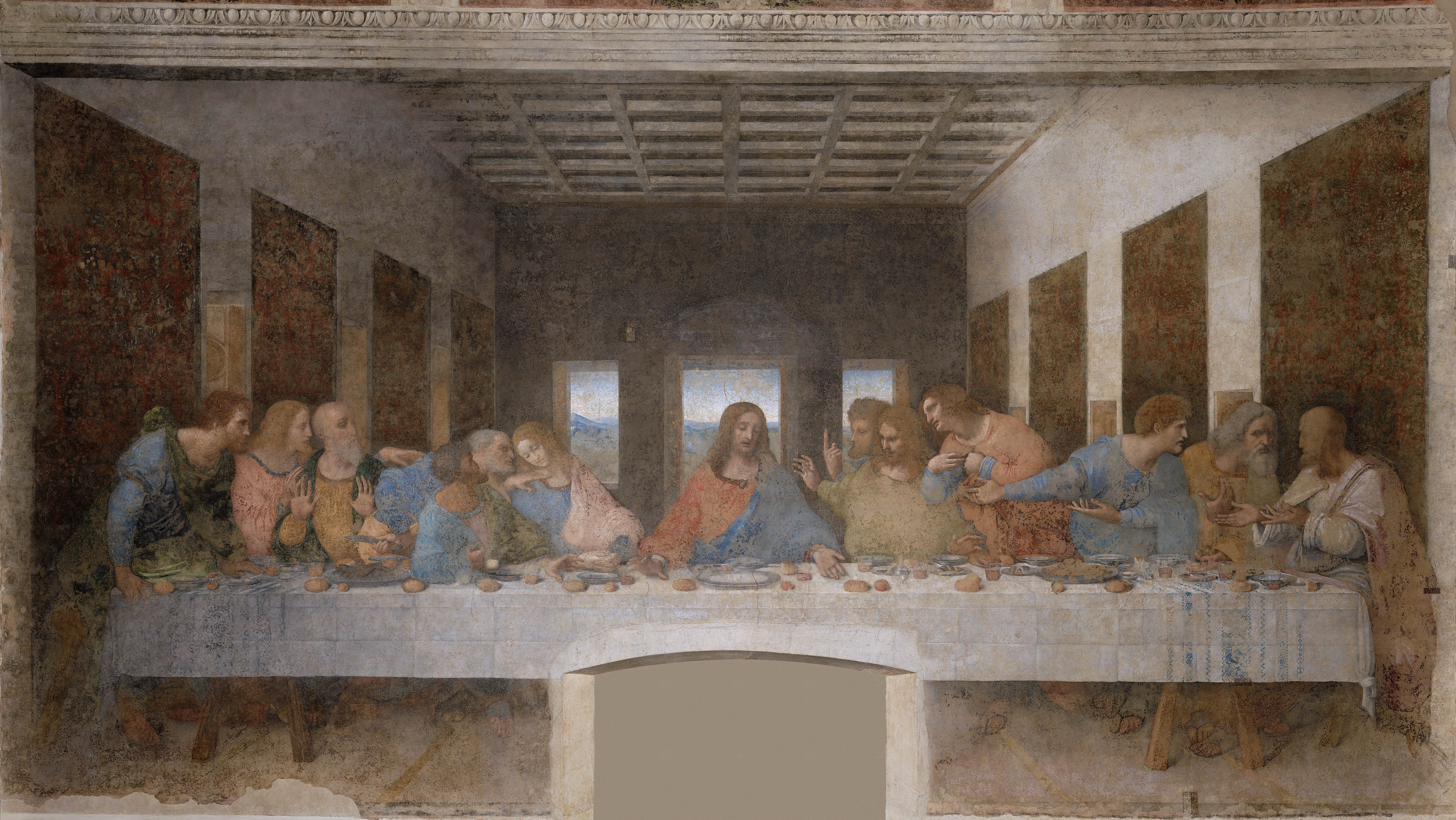
- Linear Perspective: Brunelleschi's Experiment, Khan Academy
- How One-Point Linear Perspective Works, Smarthistory
- Empire of the Eye: The Magic of Illusion: The Trinity-Masaccio, Part 2, National Gallery of Art

Perspectives (right column) are a subclass of graphical projections.

How linear or point-projection perspective works: Rays of light travel from the object (cube), through the picture plane, and to the viewer's eye (O). Vanishing points emitting straightly lines coincident with the edges the cube drawn on the picture plane are located at the left and right of the plane.

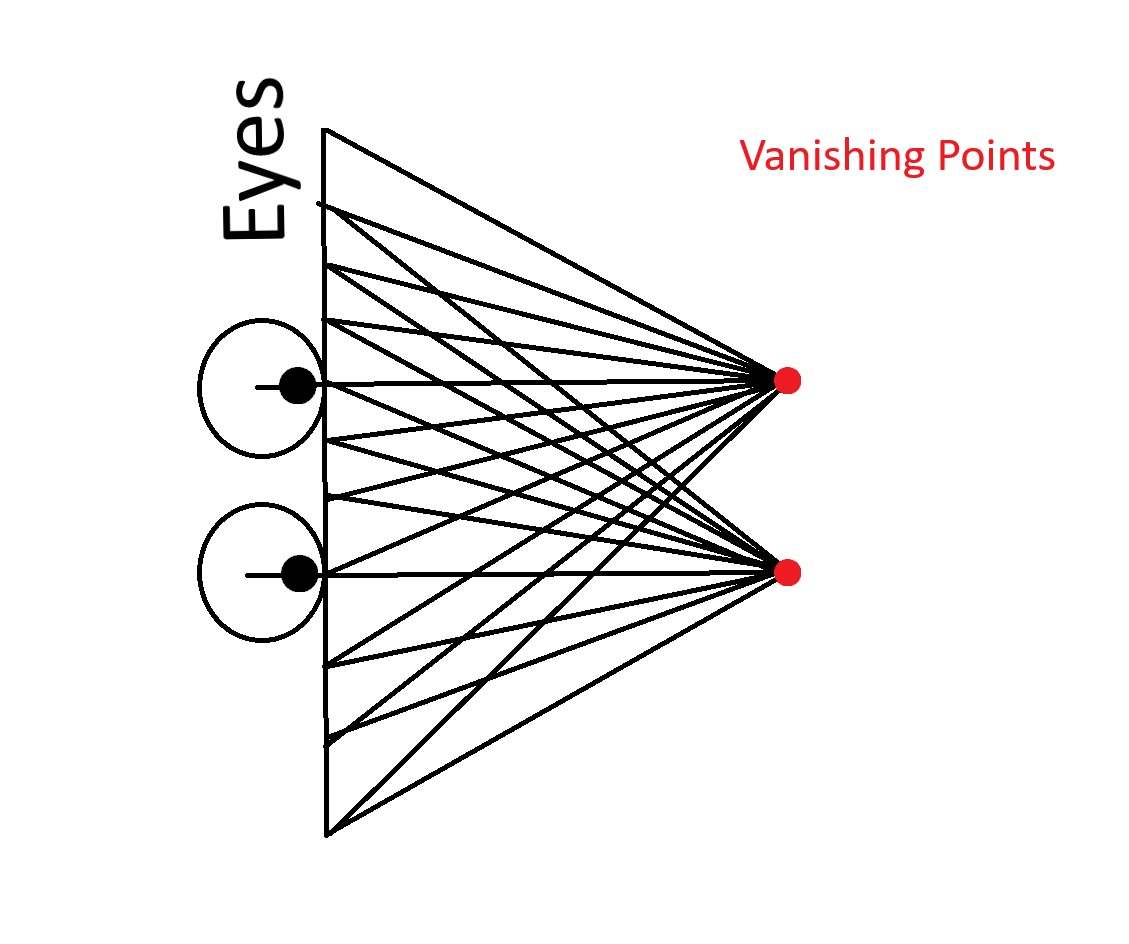
This illustration shows how the eye naturally sees objects, which are described by the lines heading to each red dot

Perspective (from Latin perspicere 'to see through') is the representation of objects on the basis of how they may appear in real-life. Perspective is an approximate representation, generally on a flat surface, of an object as it is seen by the eye. Perspective is useful for representing a three-dimensional scene in a two-dimensional medium, like paper. It is based on the optical fact that for a person an object looks N times smaller if it has been moved N times further from the eye than the original distance was.

The most characteristic features of linear perspective are that objects appear smaller as their distance from the observer increases, and that they are subject to foreshortening, meaning that an object's dimensions parallel to the line of sight appear shorter than its dimensions perpendicular to the line of sight. All objects will recede to points in the distance, usually along the horizon line, but also above and below the horizon line depending on the view used.

Italian Renaissance painters and architects including Filippo Brunelleschi, Leon Battista Alberti, Masaccio, Paolo Uccello, Piero della Francesca, Luca Pacioli and Leonardo da Vinci, studied linear perspective, wrote treatises on it, and incorporated it into their artworks.

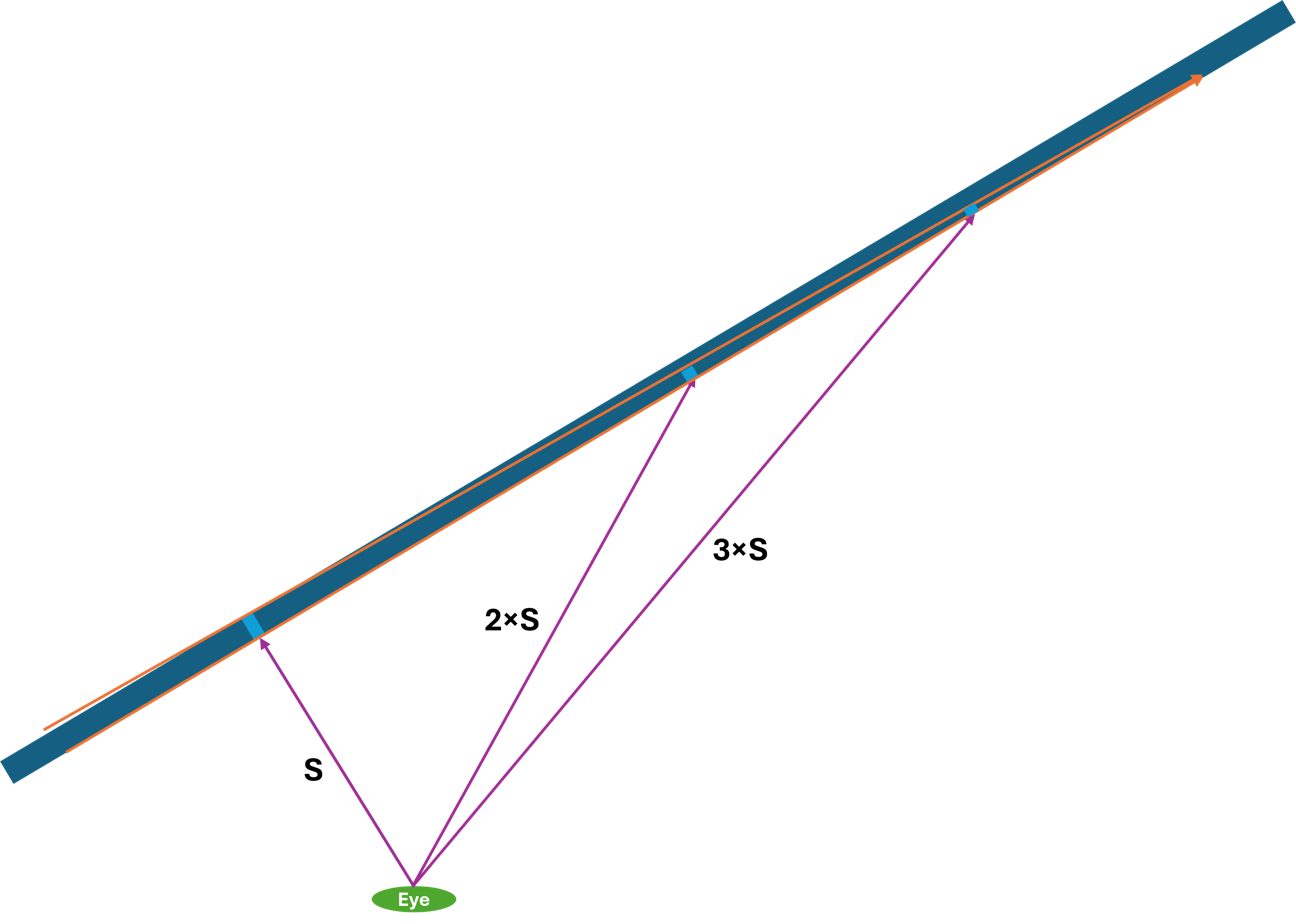
A figure explaining point-projection prospective. S is the distance between an observer's eye and an observation point on an object that is a long rectangular wall facing to the observer at a tilted angle. If the observation distance becomes N times longer, then the apparent height of the wall at the observation point is roughly N times smaller. As a result, the apparent shape of the wall over a wide angle roughly becomes a triangle which right vertex is located to the far right.

== Overview ==
Linear or point-projection perspective works by putting an imaginary flat plane that is close to an object under observation and directly facing an observer's eyes (i.e., the observer is on a normal, or perpendicular line to the plane). Then draw straight lines from every point in the object to the observer. The area on the plane where those lines pass through the plane is a point-projection prospective image resembling what is seen by the observer.

=== Examples of one-point perspective ===

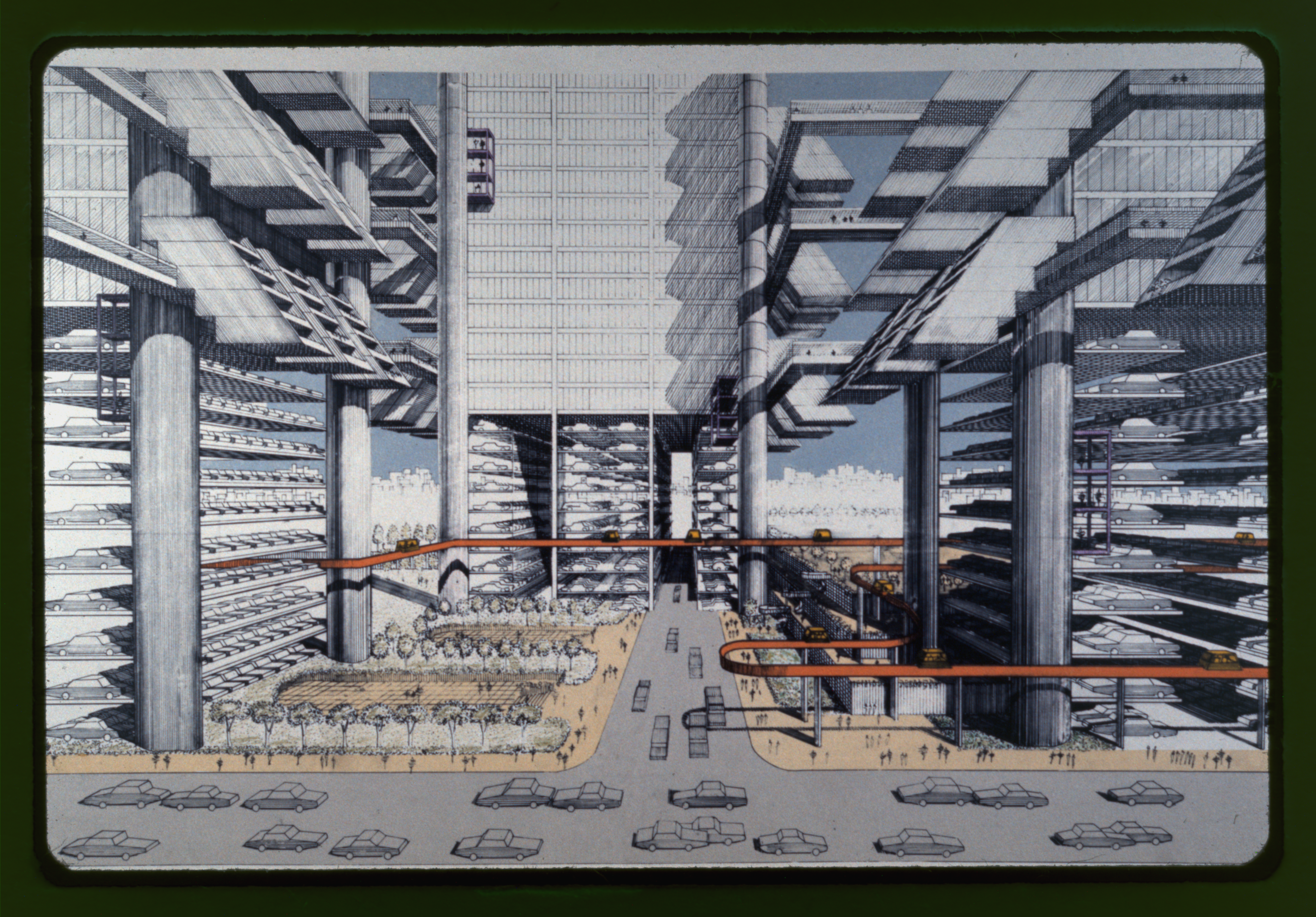

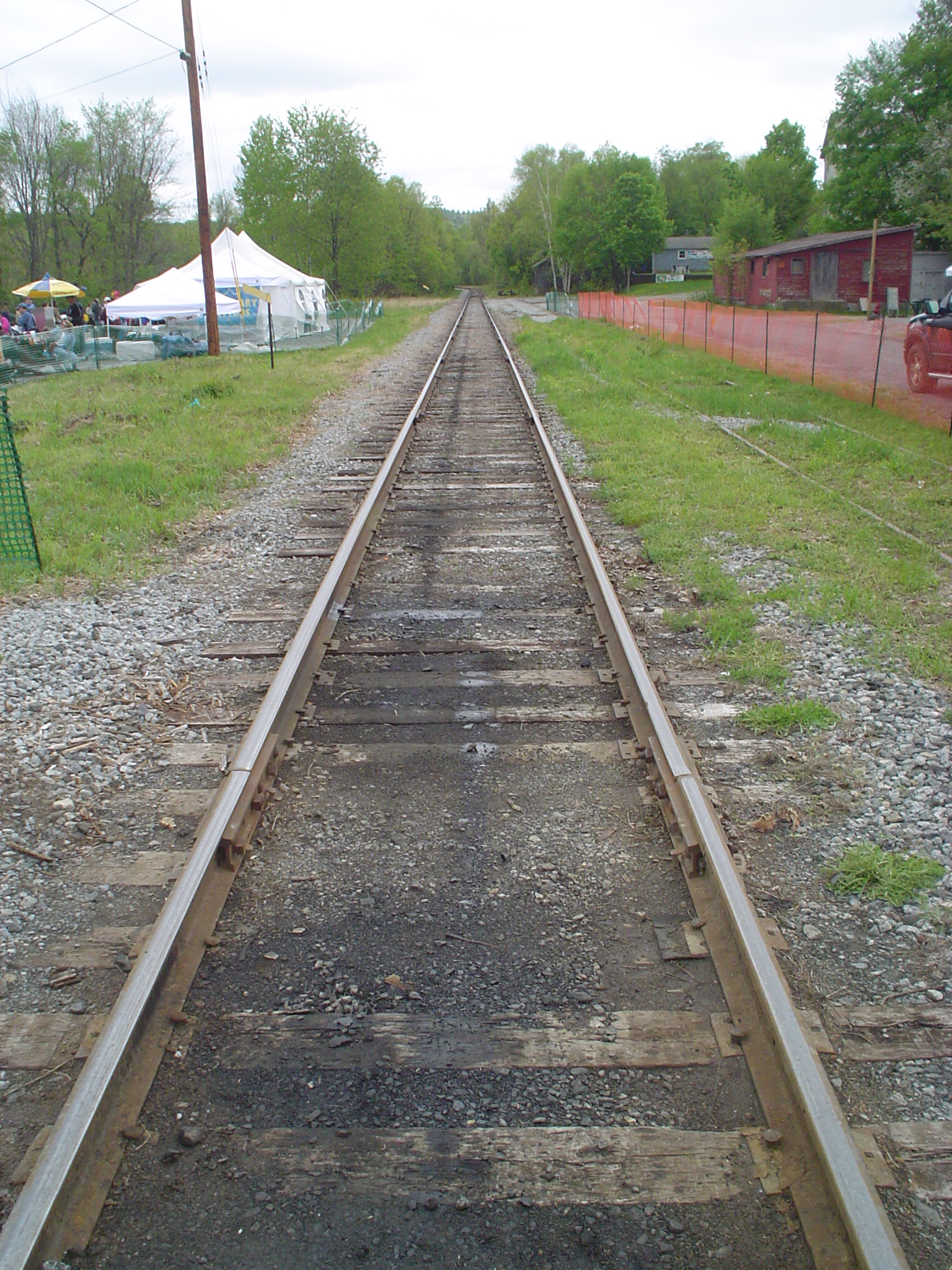

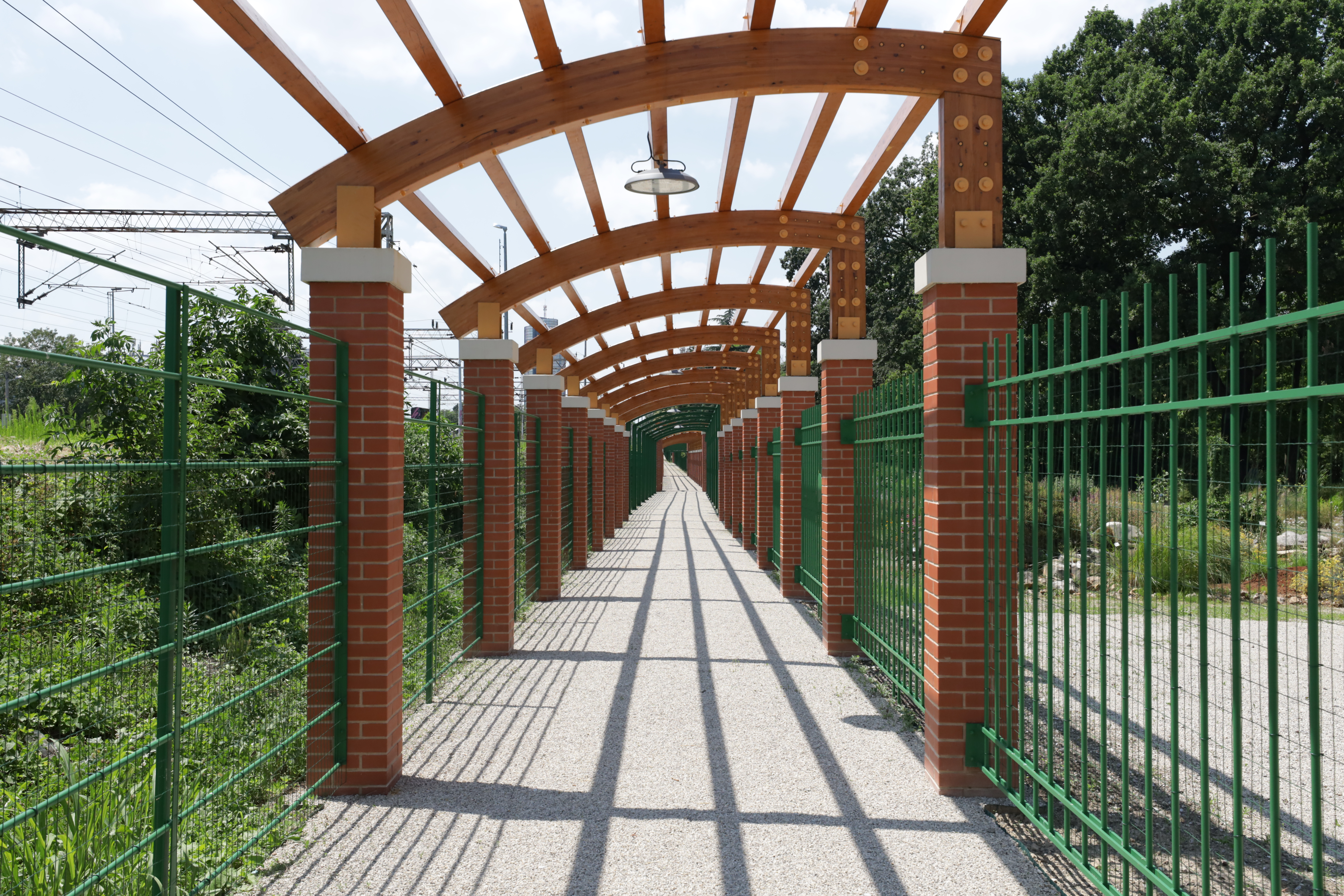

=== Examples of two-point perspective ===
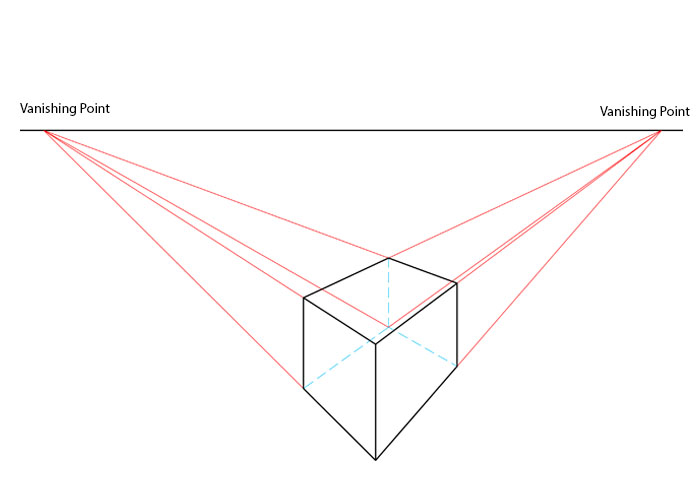
A rectilinear block drawing using two-point perspective

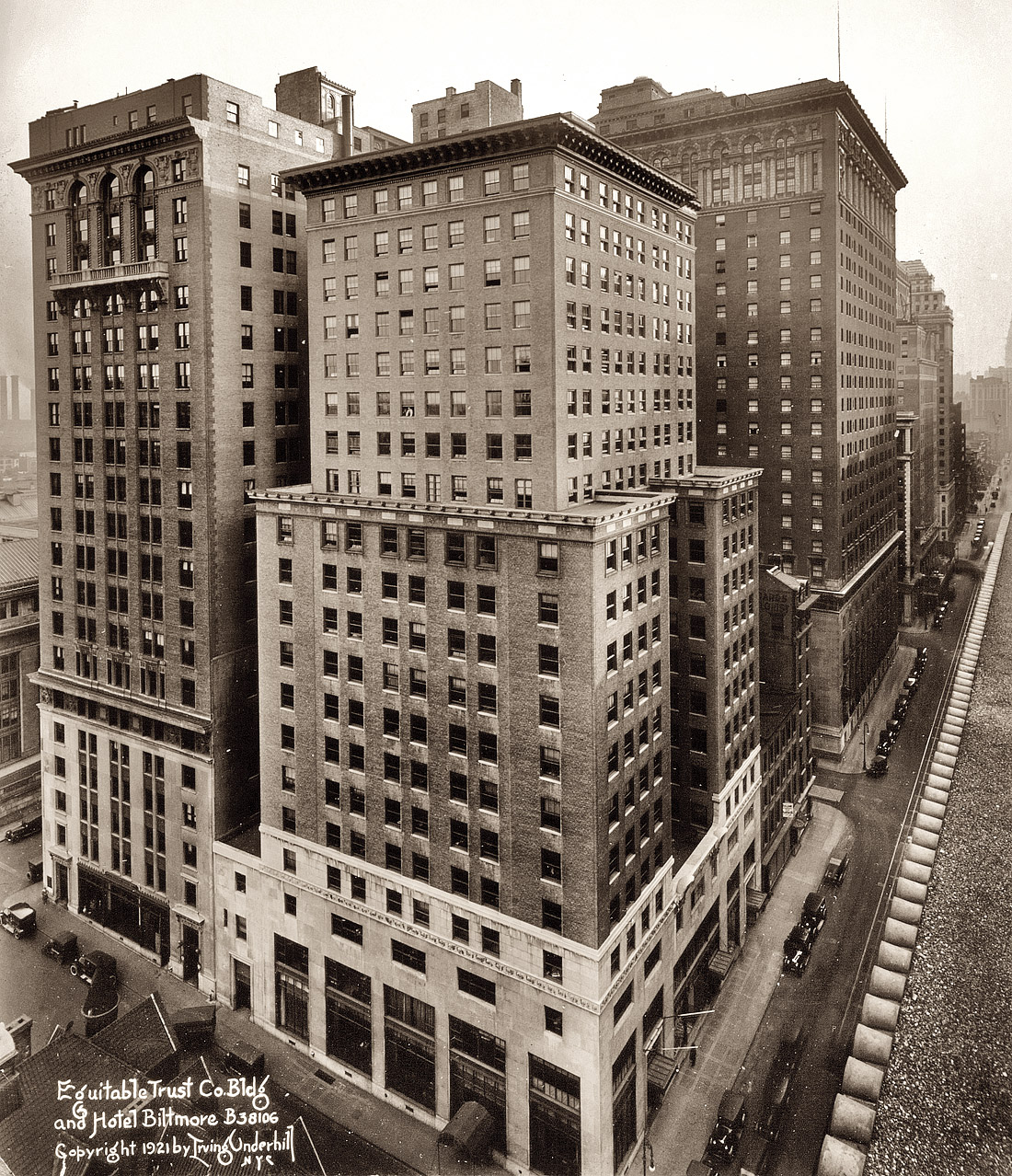

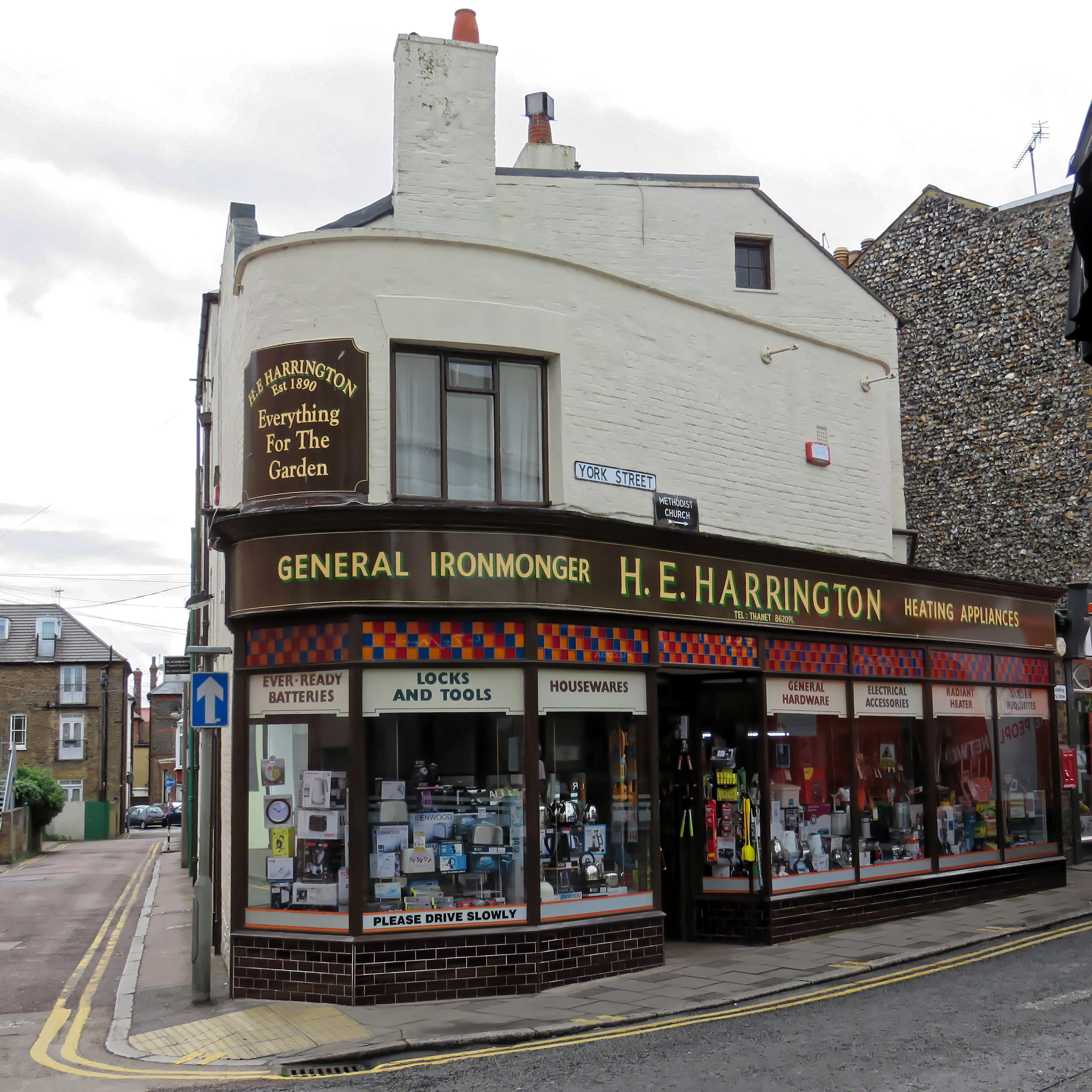

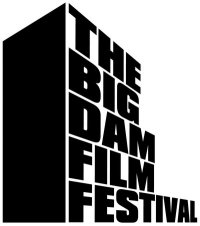

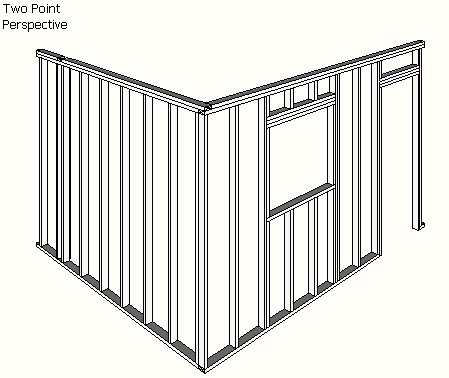

=== Examples of three-point perspective ===
A cube in three-points perspective where, compared with the above cube in two-points prospective, there is an additional vanishing point far below the cube, from which straight lines come that are coincident with vertical edges of the cube.

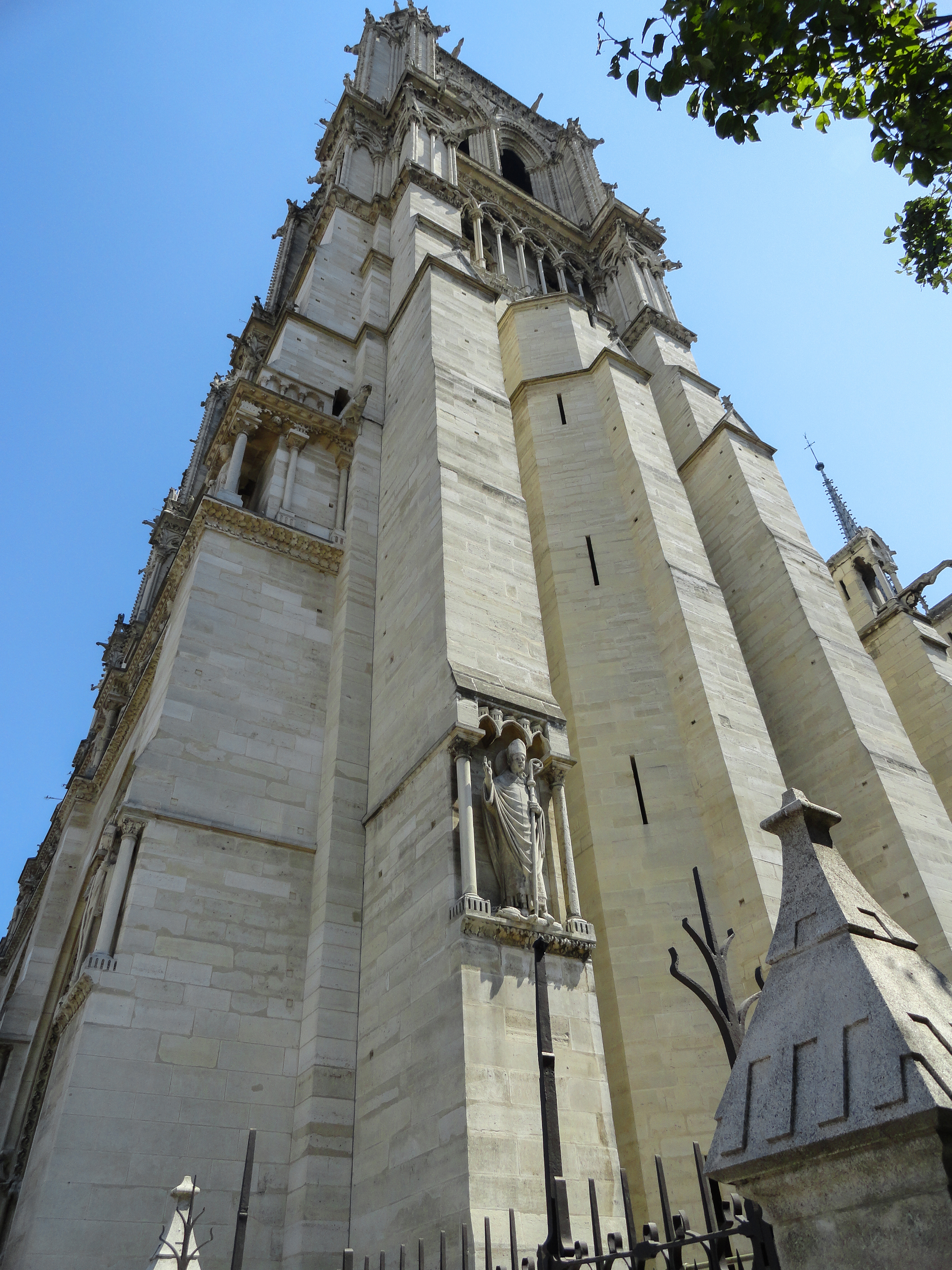

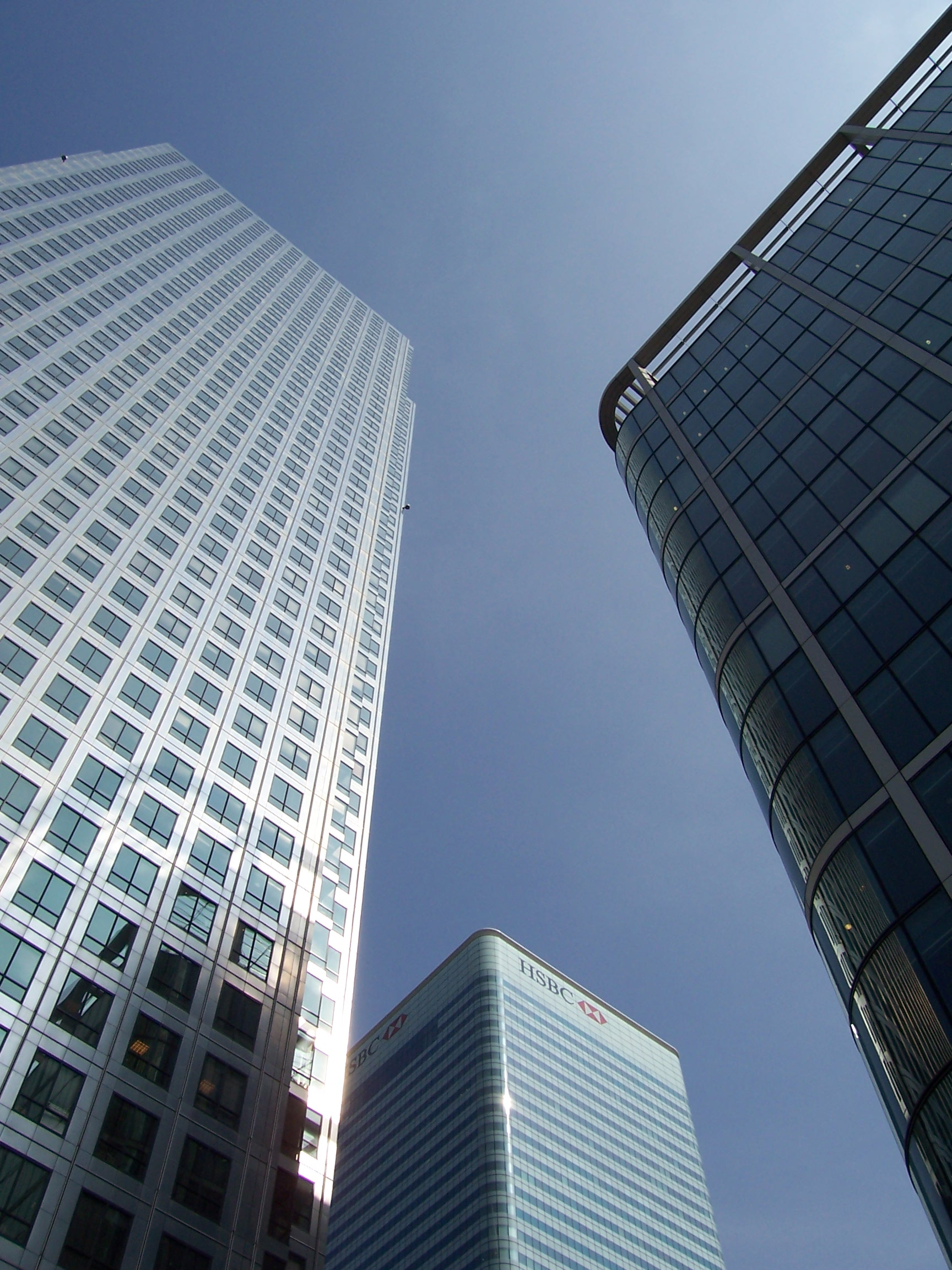

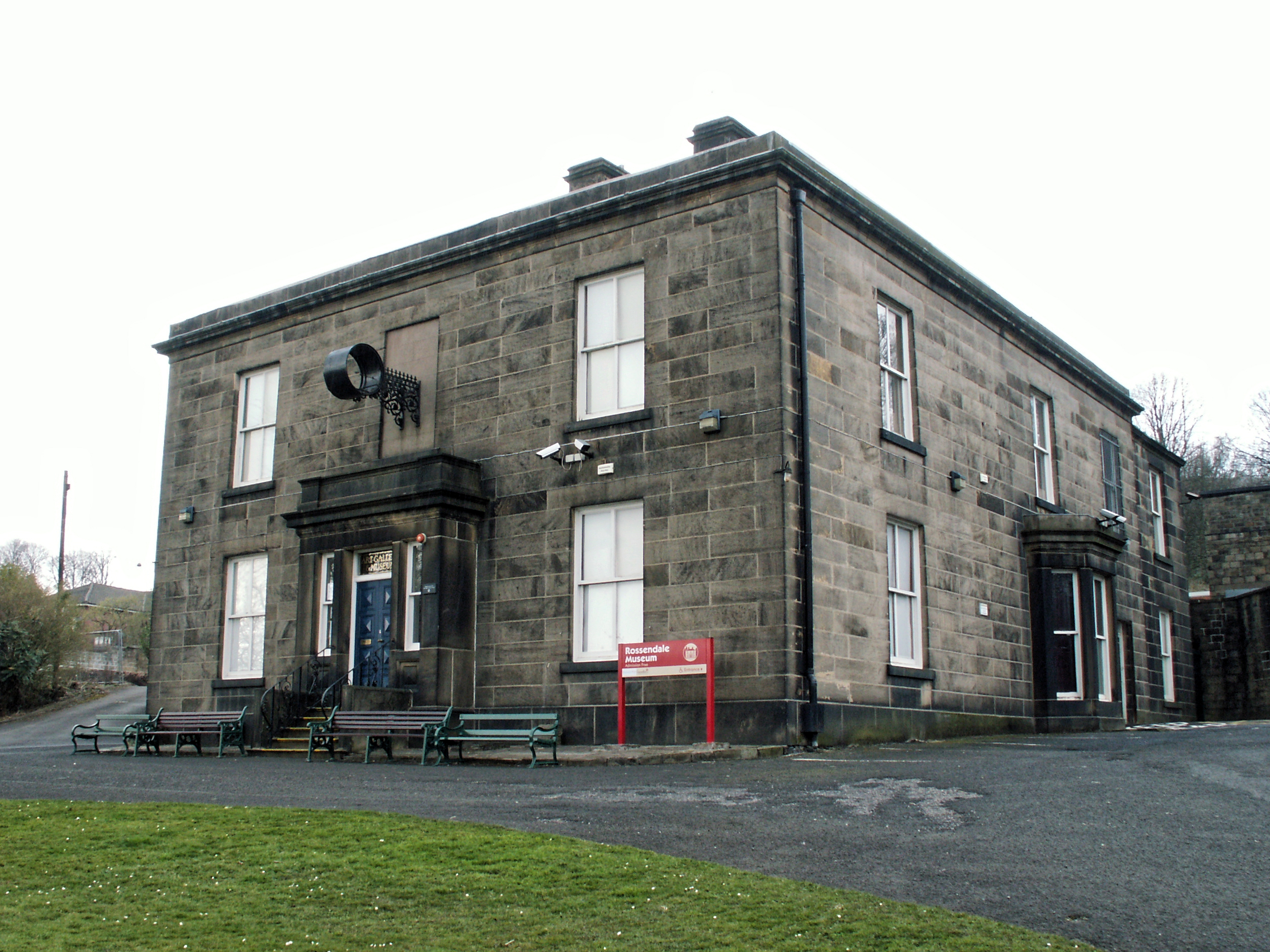

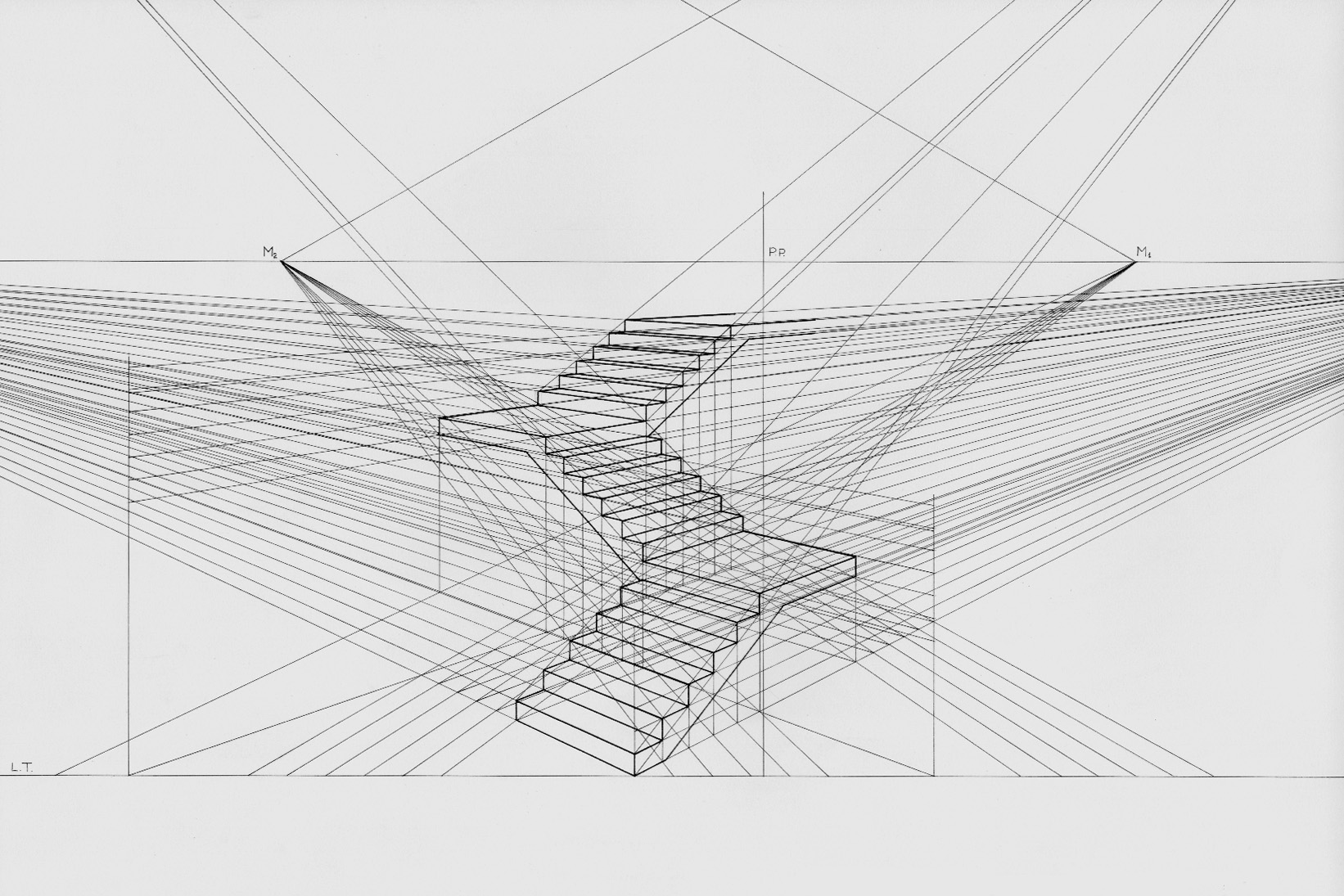
Staircase in multi-points perspective. Each point is a vanishing point from which straight lines come, and these lines are a guide to draw 3-dimensional object.

=== Examples of curvilinear perspective ===
Additionally, a central vanishing point can be used (just as with one-point perspective) to indicate frontal (foreshortened) depth.

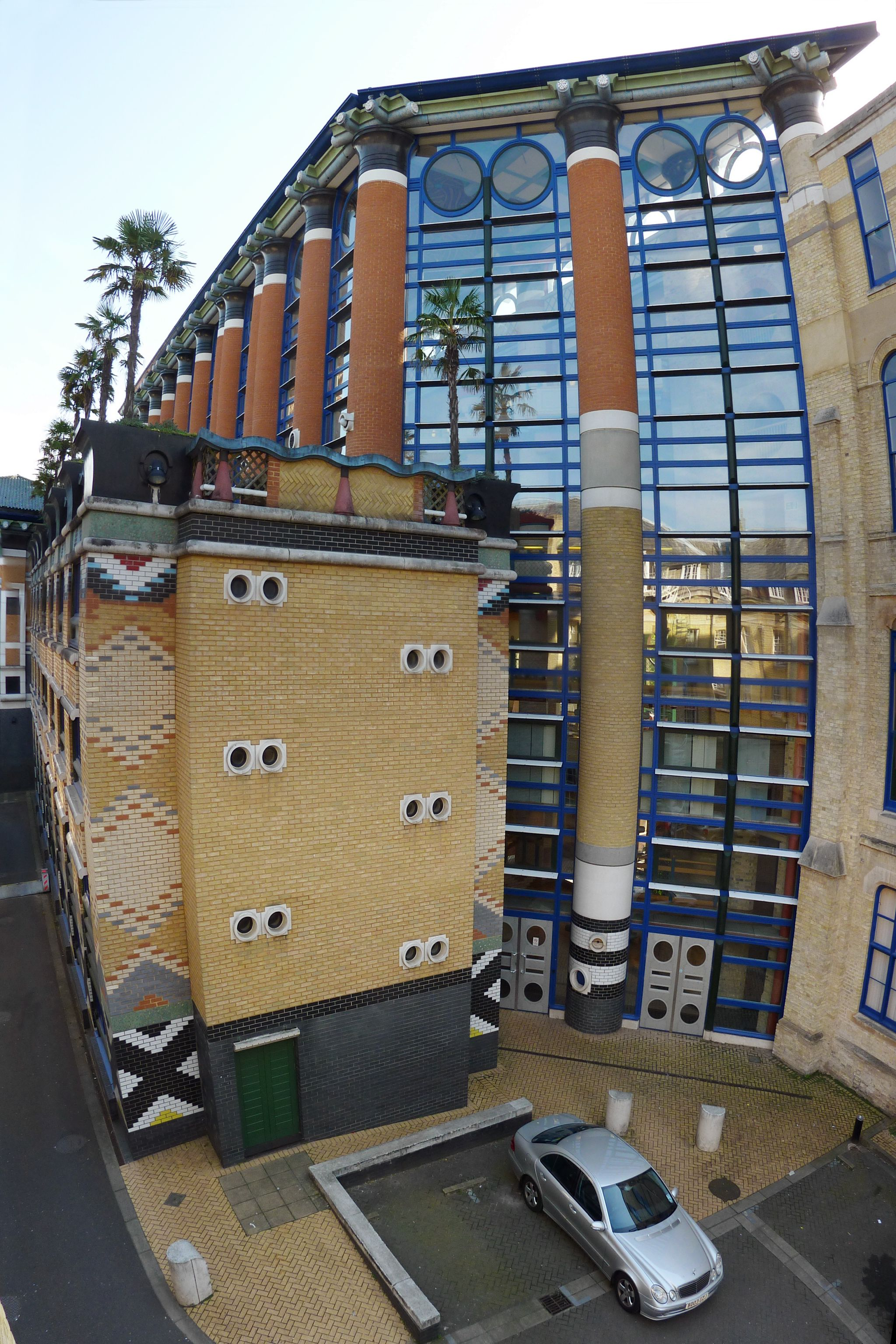

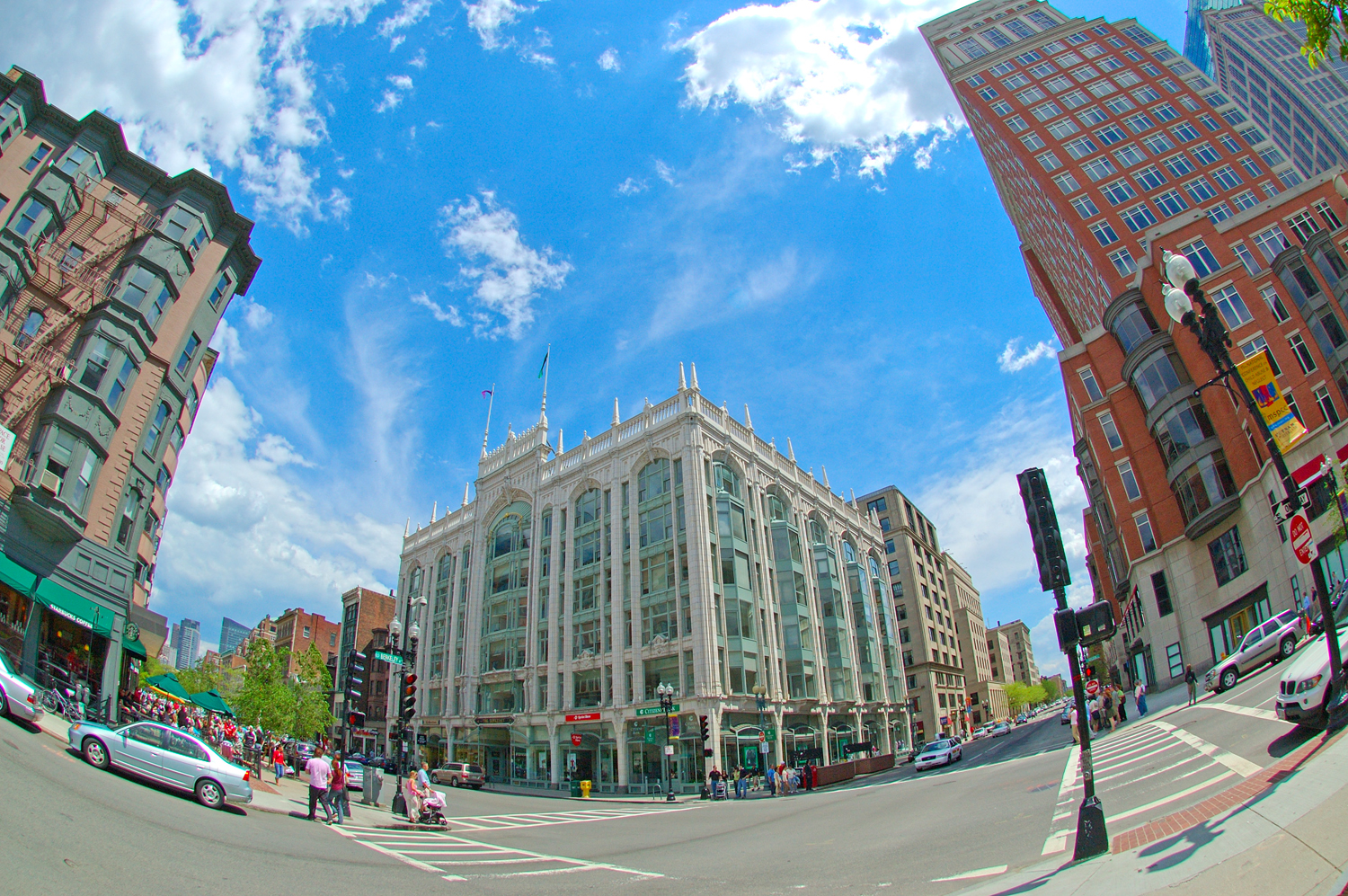

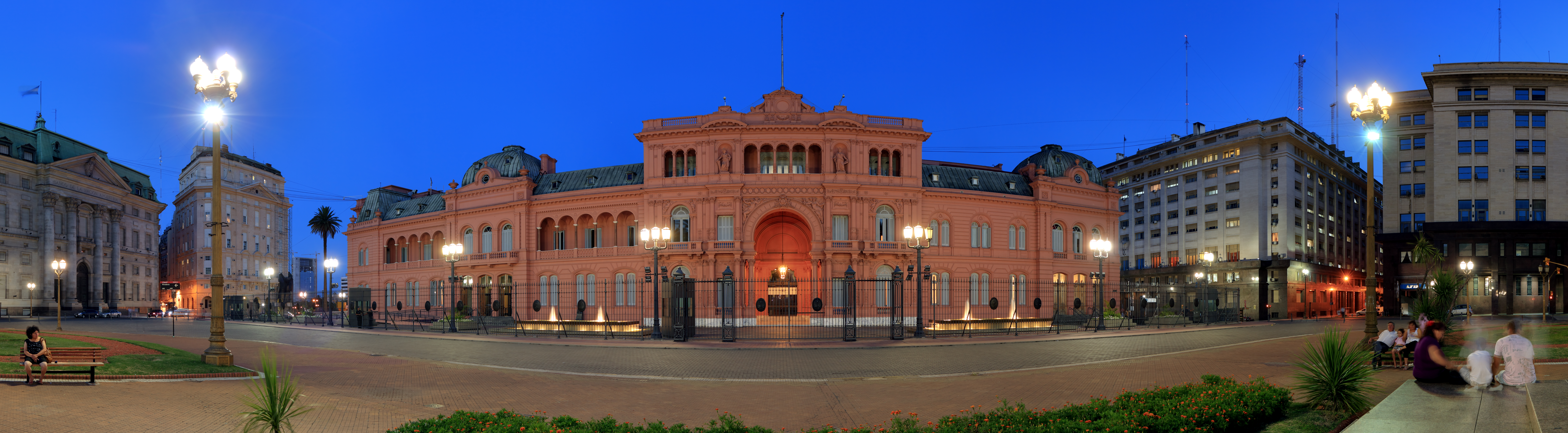

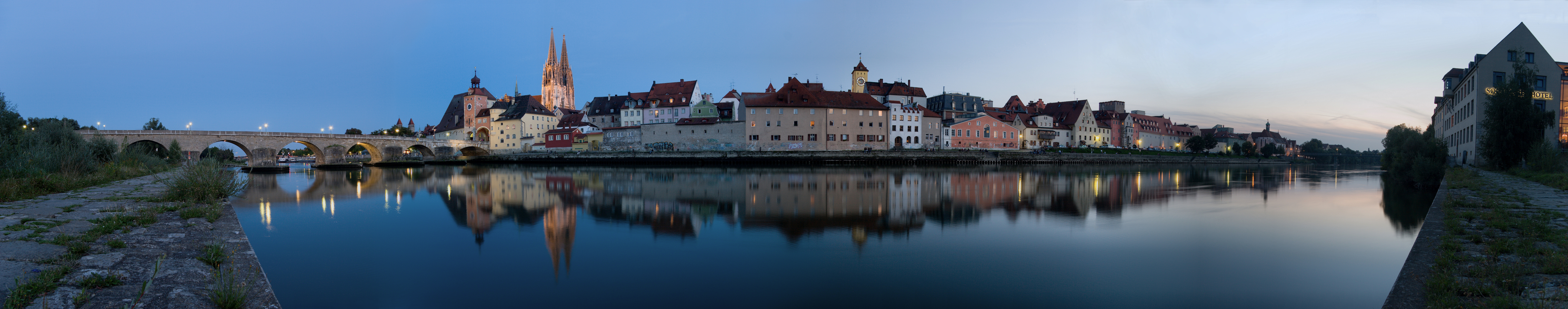

== History ==
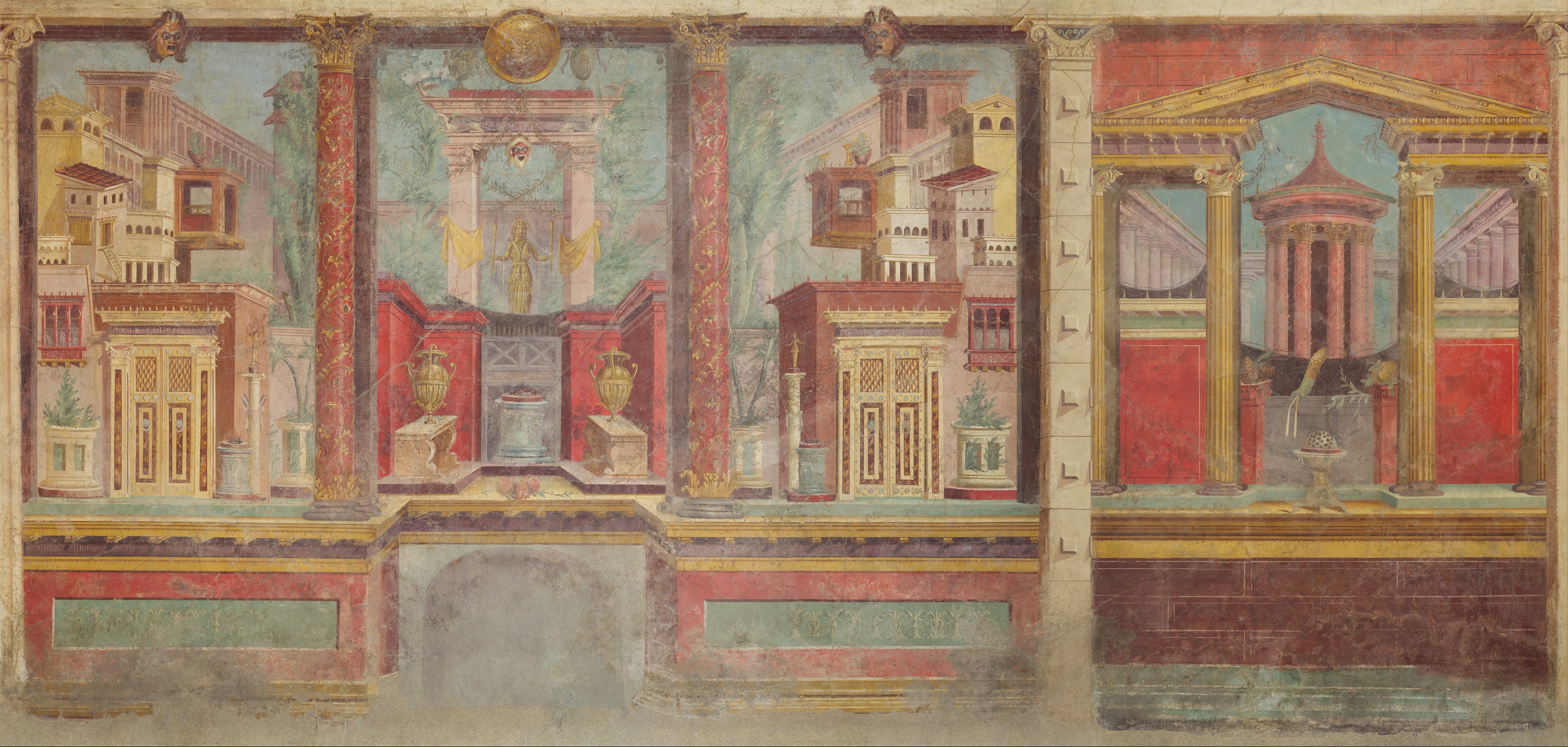
Fresco from the Villa of Publius Fannius Synistor in Boscoreale near Pompeii, 1st ct. BC

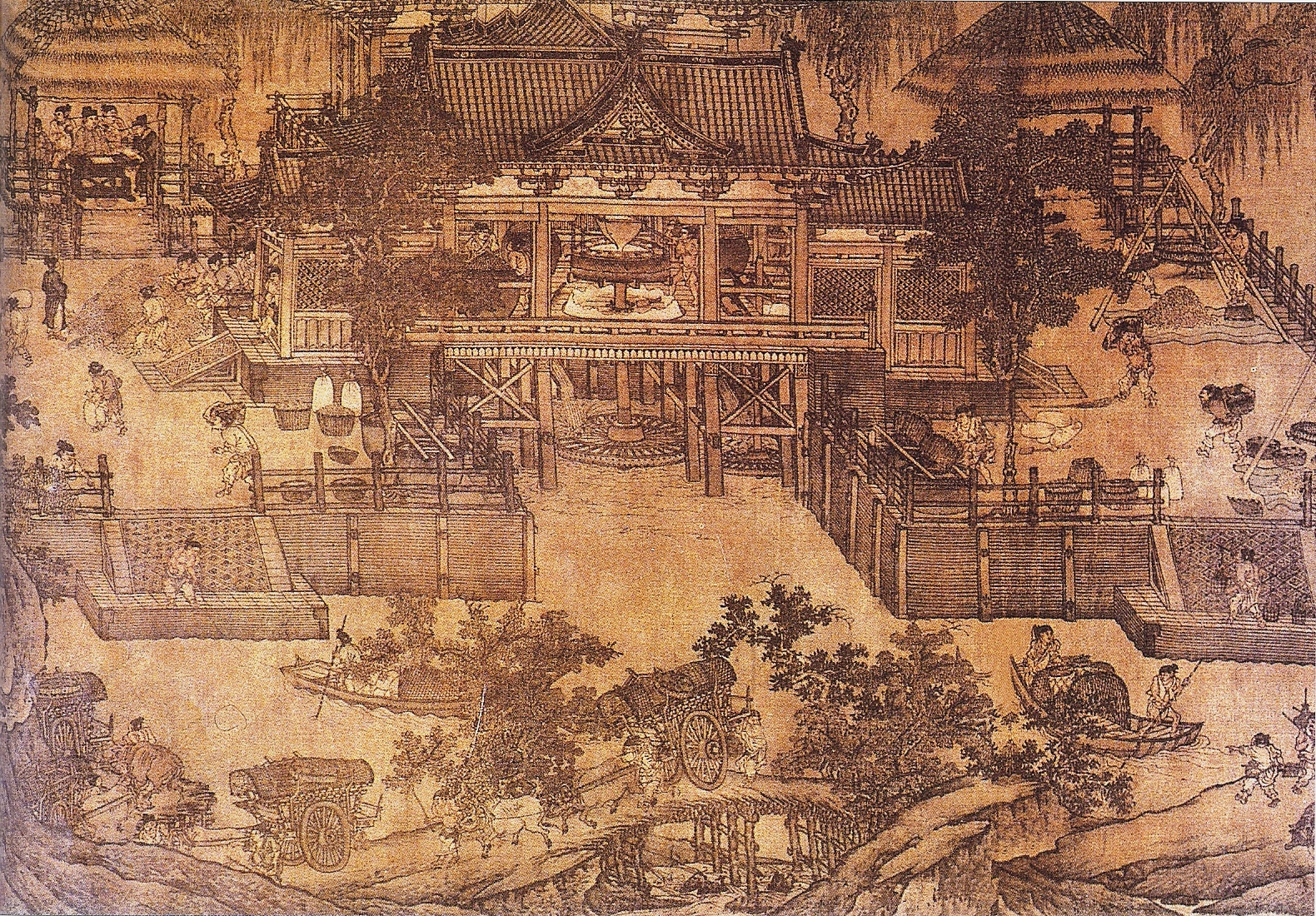
A Song dynasty watercolor painting of a mill in an oblique projection, 12th century

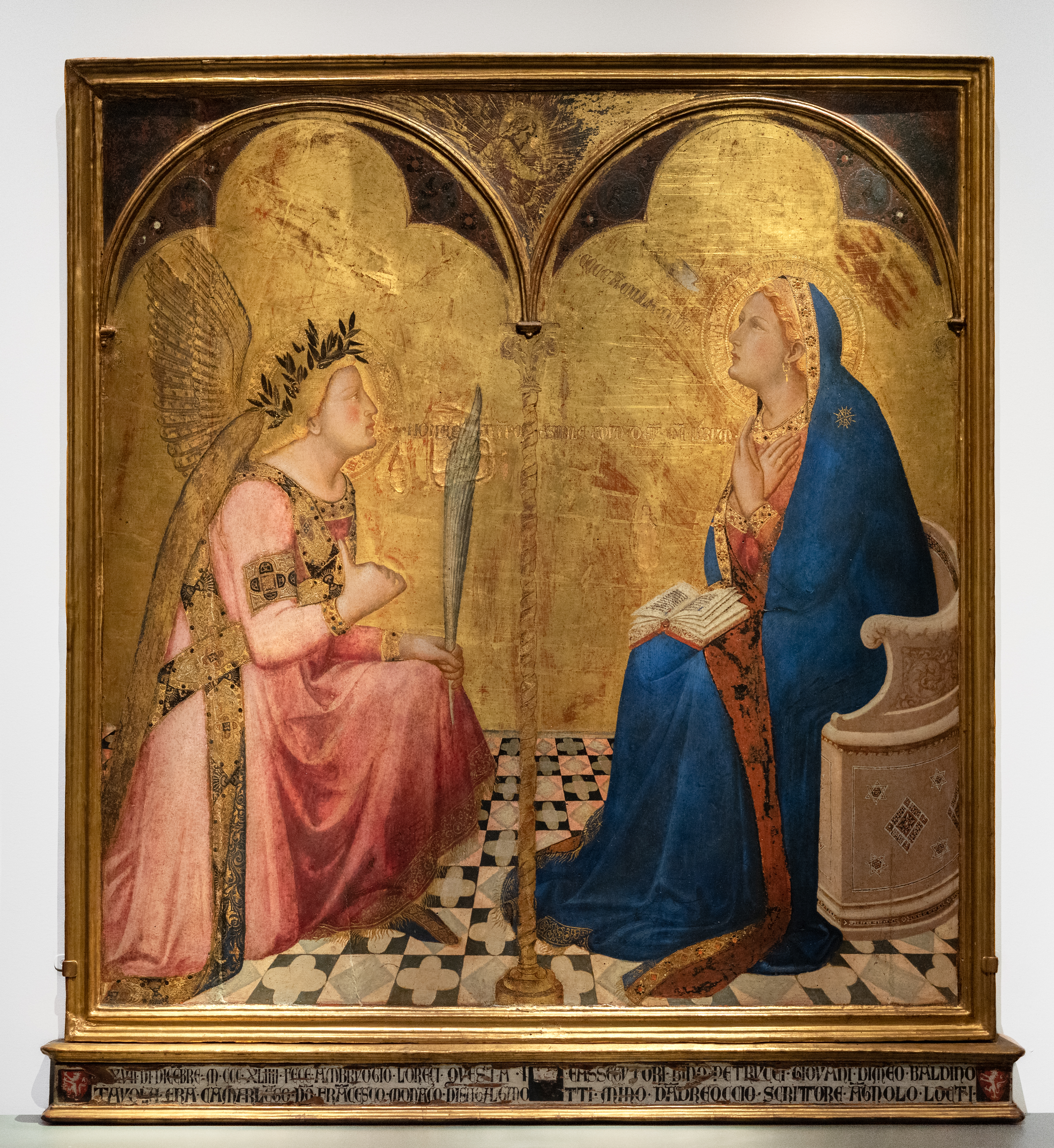
The floor tiles in Lorenzetti's Annunciation (1344) strongly anticipate modern perspective

=== Early history ===
The earliest art paintings and drawings typically sized many objects and characters hierarchically according to their spiritual or thematic importance, not their distance from the viewer, and did not use foreshortening. The most important figures are often shown as the highest in a composition, also from hieratic motives, leading to the so-called "vertical perspective", common in the art of Ancient Egypt, where a group of "nearer" figures are shown below the larger figure or figures; simple overlapping was also employed to relate distance. Additionally, oblique foreshortening of round elements like shields and wheels is evident in Ancient Greek red-figure pottery.

Systematic attempts to evolve a system of perspective are usually considered to have begun around the fifth century BC in the art of ancient Greece, as part of a developing interest in illusionism allied to theatrical scenery. This was detailed within Aristotle's Poetics as skenographia: using flat panels on a stage to give the illusion of depth. The philosophers Anaxagoras and Democritus worked out geometric theories of perspective for use with skenographia. Alcibiades had paintings in his house designed using skenographia, so this art was not confined merely to the stage. Euclid in his Optics (c. 300 BC) argues correctly that the perceived size of an object is not related to its distance from the eye by a simple proportion. In the first-century BC frescoes of the Villa of P. Fannius Synistor, multiple vanishing points are used in a systematic but not fully consistent manner.

Chinese artists made use of oblique projection from the first or second century until the 18th century. It is not certain how they came to use the technique; Dubery and Willats (1983) speculate that the Chinese acquired the technique from India, which acquired it from Ancient Rome, while others credit it as an indigenous invention of Ancient China. Oblique projection is also seen in Japanese art, such as in the Ukiyo-e paintings of Torii Kiyonaga (1752–1815). (Note: In the 18th century, Chinese artists began to combine oblique perspective with regular diminution of size of people and objects with distance; no particular vantage point is chosen, but a convincing effect is achieved.)

By the later periods of antiquity, artists, especially those in less popular traditions, were well aware that distant objects could be shown smaller than those close at hand for increased realism, but whether this convention was actually used in a work depended on many factors. Some of the paintings found in the ruins of Pompeii show a remarkable realism and perspective for their time. It has been claimed that comprehensive systems of perspective were evolved in antiquity, but most scholars do not accept this. Hardly any of the many works where such a system would have been used have survived. A passage in Philostratus suggests that classical artists and theorists thought in terms of "circles" at equal distance from the viewer, like a classical semi-circular theatre seen from the stage. The roof beams in rooms in the Vatican Virgil, from about 400 AD, are shown converging, more or less, on a common vanishing point, but this is not systematically related to the rest of the composition.

Medieval artists in Europe, like those in the Islamic world and China, were aware of the general principle of varying the relative size of elements according to distance, but even more than classical art were perfectly ready to override it for other reasons. Buildings were often shown obliquely according to a particular convention. The use and sophistication of attempts to convey distance increased steadily during the period, but without a basis in a systematic theory. Byzantine art was also aware of these principles, but also used the reverse perspective convention for the setting of principal figures. Ambrogio Lorenzetti painted a floor with convergent lines in his Presentation at the Temple (1342), though the rest of the painting lacks perspective elements.

=== Renaissance ===
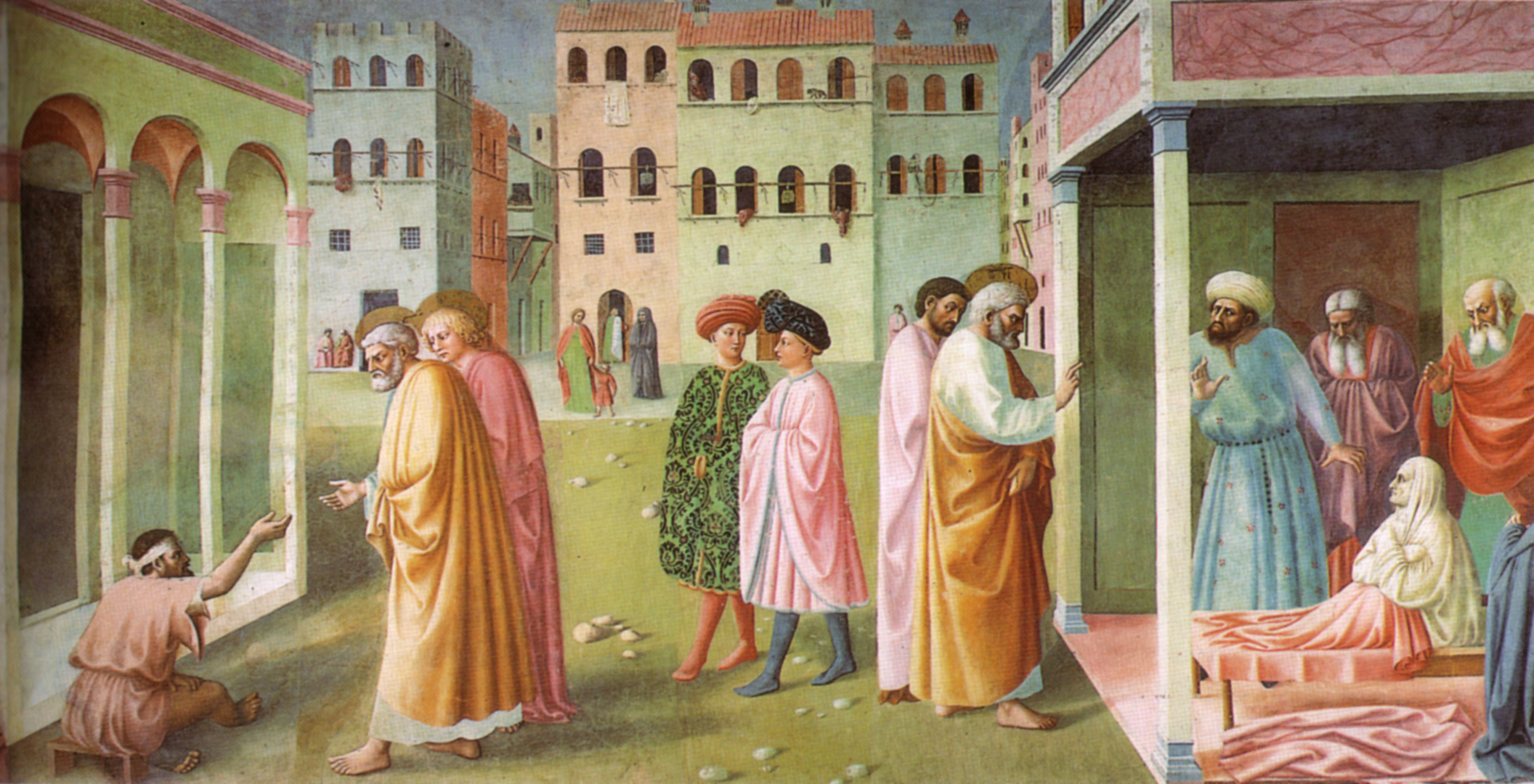
Detail of Masolino da Panicale's St. Peter Healing a Cripple and the Raising of Tabitha (c. 1423), the earliest extant artwork known to use a consistent vanishing point.

It is generally accepted that Filippo Brunelleschi conducted a series of experiments between 1415 and 1420, which included making drawings of various Florentine buildings in correct perspective. According to Vasari and Antonio Manetti, in about 1420, Brunelleschi demonstrated his discovery of perspective by having people look through a hole on his painting from the backside. Through it, they would see a building such as the Florence Baptistery for which the painting was made. When Brunelleschi lifted a mirror between the building and the painting, the mirror reflected the painting to an observer looking through the hole, so that the observer can compare how similar the building and the painting of it are. (The vanishing point is centered from the perspective of an experiment participant.) Brunelleschi applied this new system of perspective to his paintings around 1425.

This scenario is indicative, but faces several problems that are still debated. First of all, nothing can be said for certain about the correctness of his perspective construction of the Baptistery of San Giovanni because Brunelleschi's panel is lost. Second, no other perspective painting or drawing by Brunelleschi is known. (In fact, Brunelleschi was not known to have painted at all.) Third, in the account written by Antonio Manetti in his Vita di Ser Brunellesco at the end of the 15th century on Brunelleschi's panel, there is not a single occurrence of the word "experiment". Fourth, the conditions listed by Manetti are contradictory with each other. For example, the description of the eyepiece sets a visual field of 15°, much narrower than the visual field resulting from the urban landscape described.

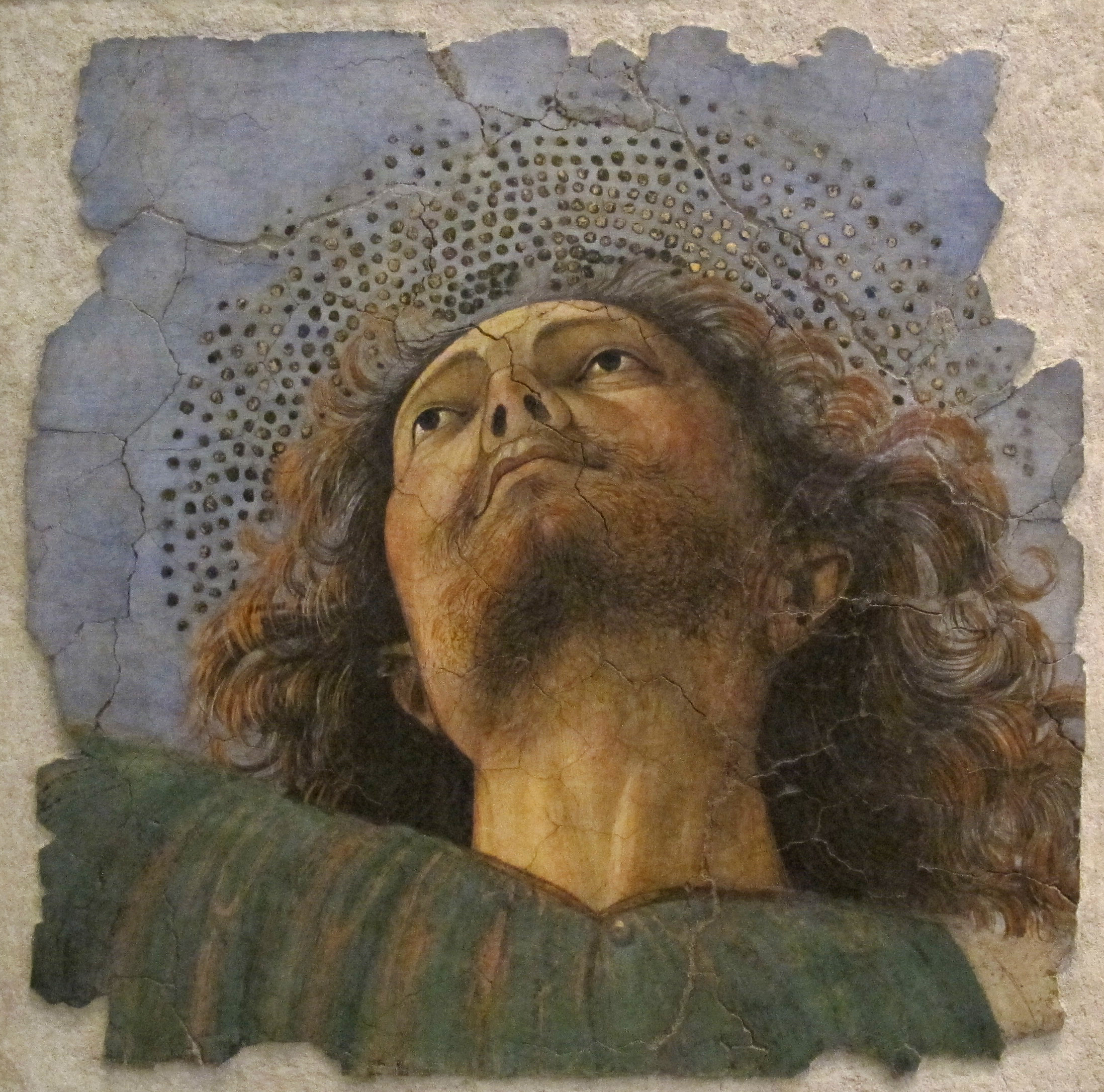
Melozzo da Forlì's use of upward foreshortening in his frescoes, Basilica dei Santi Apostoli, Rome, c. 1480

Soon after Brunelleschi's demonstrations, nearly every interested artist in Florence and in Italy used geometrical perspective in their paintings and sculpture, notably Donatello, Masaccio,Lorenzo Ghiberti, Masolino da Panicale, Paolo Uccello, and Filippo Lippi. Not only was perspective a way of showing depth, it was also a new method of creating a composition. Visual art could now depict a single, unified scene rather than a combination of several. Early examples include Masolino's St. Peter Healing a Cripple and the Raising of Tabitha (c. 1423), Donatello's The Feast of Herod (c. 1427), as well as Ghiberti's Jacob and Esau and other panels from the east doors of the Florence Baptistery. Masaccio (d. 1428) achieved an illusionistic effect by placing the vanishing point at the viewer's eye level in his Holy Trinity (c. 1427), and in The Tribute Money, it is placed behind the face of Jesus. (Note: Near the end of the 15th century, Leonardo da Vinci placed the vanishing point in his Last Supper behind Christ's other cheek.) In the late 15th century, Melozzo da Forlì first applied the technique of foreshortening (in Rome, Loreto, Forlì and others).

This overall story is based on qualitative judgments, and would need to be faced against the material evaluations that have been conducted on Renaissance perspective paintings. Apart from the paintings of Piero della Francesca, which are a model of the genre, the majority of 15th-century works show serious errors in their geometric construction. This is true of Masaccio's Trinity fresco and of many works, including those by renowned artists like Leonardo da Vinci.

As shown by the quick proliferation of accurate perspective paintings in Florence, Brunelleschi likely understood (with help from his friend the mathematician Toscanelli), but did not publish the mathematics behind perspective. Decades later, his friend Leon Battista Alberti wrote De pictura (c. 1435), a treatise on proper methods of showing distance in painting. Alberti's primary breakthrough was not to show the mathematics in terms of conical projections, as it actually appears to the eye. Instead, he formulated the theory based on planar projections, or how the rays of light, passing from the viewer's eye to the landscape, would strike the picture plane (the painting). He was then able to calculate the apparent height of a distant object using two similar triangles. The mathematics behind similar triangles is relatively simple, having been long ago formulated by Euclid. (Note: In viewing a wall, for instance, the first triangle has a vertex at the user's eye, and vertices at the top and bottom of the wall. The bottom of this triangle is the distance from the viewer to the wall. The second, similar triangle, has a point at the viewer's eye, and has a length equal to the viewer's eye from the painting. The height of the second triangle can then be determined through a simple ratio, as proven by Euclid.) Alberti was also trained in the science of optics through the school of Padua and under the influence of Biagio Pelacani da Parma who studied Alhazen's Book of Optics. This book, translated around 1200 into Latin, had laid the mathematical foundation for perspective in Europe.

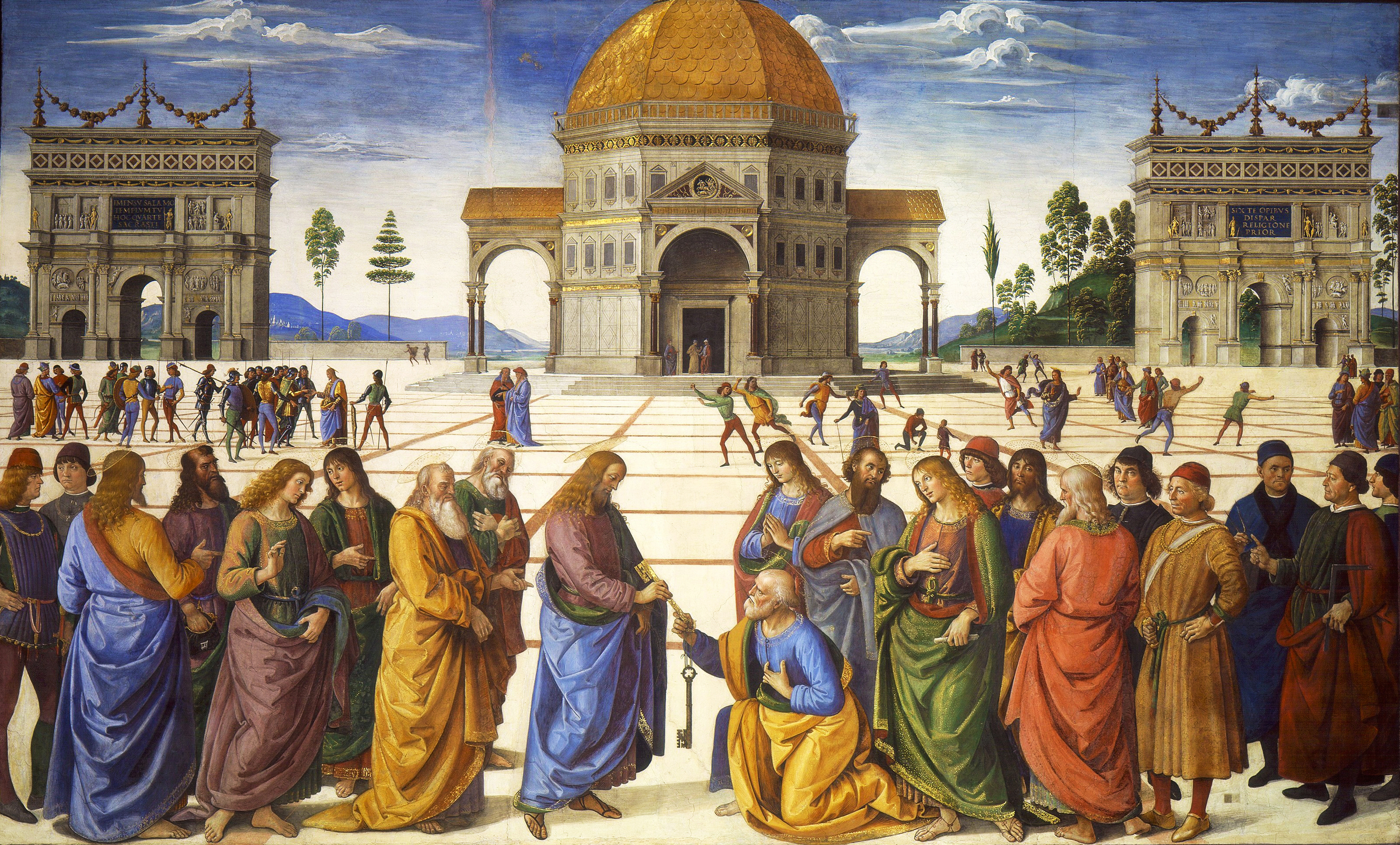
Pietro Perugino's use of perspective in Delivery of the Keys (1482), a fresco at the Sistine Chapel

Piero della Francesca elaborated on De pictura in his De Prospectiva pingendi in the 1470s, making many references to Euclid. Alberti had limited himself to figures on the ground plane and giving an overall basis for perspective. Della Francesca fleshed it out, explicitly covering solids in any area of the picture plane. Della Francesca also started the now common practice of using illustrated figures to explain the mathematical concepts, making his treatise easier to understand than Alberti's. Della Francesca was also the first to accurately draw the Platonic solids as they would appear in perspective. Luca Pacioli's 1509 Divina proportione (Divine Proportion), illustrated by Leonardo da Vinci, summarizes the use of perspective in painting, including much of Della Francesca's treatise. Leonardo applied one-point perspective as well as shallow focus to some of his works.

Two-point perspective was demonstrated as early as 1525 by Albrecht Dürer, who studied perspective by reading Piero and Pacioli's works, in his Unterweisung der Messung ("Instruction of the Measurement").

== Limitations ==
Perspective images are created with reference to a particular center of vision for the picture plane. In order for the resulting image to appear identical to the original scene, a viewer must view the image from the exact vantage point used in the calculations relative to the image. When viewed from a different point, this cancels out what would appear to be distortions in the image. For example, a sphere drawn in perspective will be stretched into an ellipse. These apparent distortions are more pronounced away from the center of the image as the angle between a projected ray (from the scene to the eye) becomes more acute relative to the picture plane. Artists may choose to "correct" perspective distortions, for example by drawing all spheres as perfect circles, or by drawing figures as if centered on the direction of view. In practice, unless the viewer observes the image from an extreme angle, like standing far to the side of a painting, the perspective normally looks more or less correct. This is referred to as "Zeeman's Paradox".

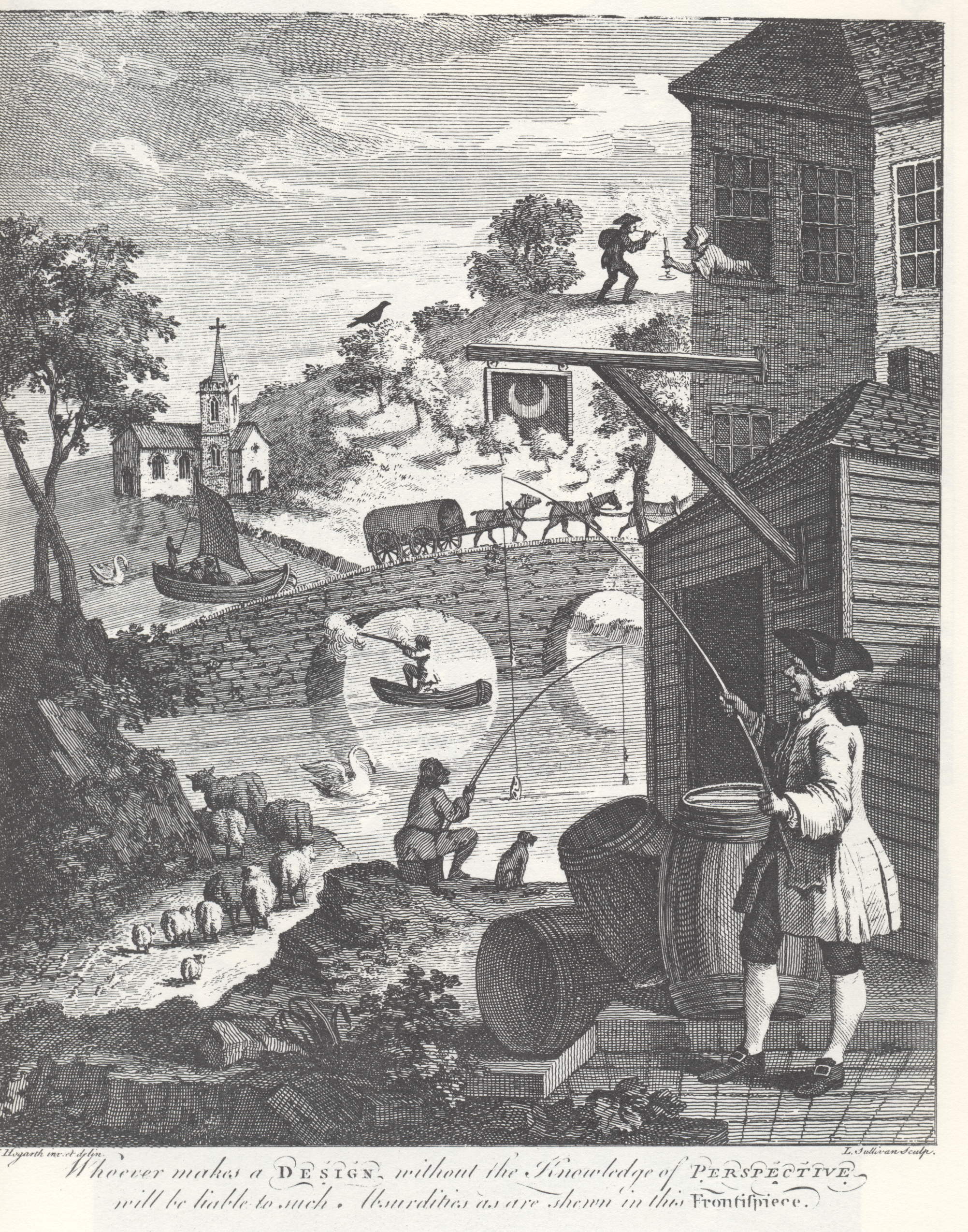
Satire on False Perspective by William Hogarth, 1753

Example of a painting that combines various perspectives: The Frozen City (Museum of Art Aarau, Switzerland) by Matthias A. K. Zimmermann

== See also ==
- Aerial perspective
- Anamorphosis
- Camera angle
- Cutaway drawing
- Perspective (geometry)
- Perspective control
- Perspective distortion
- Telephoto compression
- Trompe-l'œil
- Uki-e
- Zograscope
