= Jelger Wiegersma =

Dutch Magic: The Gathering player (born 1981)

- Born: December 4, 1981 (age 44)
- Nationality: (Netherlands) Dutch
- Winnings: US$246,320
- Pro Tour wins (Top 8): 1 (5)
- Grand Prix wins (Top 8): 2 (15)
- Lifetime Pro Points: 451
- Planeswalker Level: 50 (Archmage)

Jelger Wiegersma (born 4 December 1981) is a Dutch Magic: The Gathering player. Though no longer a professional player, he still regularly attends Pro Tours. He won Pro Tour Seattle 2004 as a member of team Von Dutch with teammates Jeroen Remie and Kamiel Cornelissen. He also won two Grand Prix, in 2003 and 2008. In 2008, he was elected to the Magic: The Gathering Hall of Fame.

== Career ==
Jelger Wiegersma first played on the Pro Tour in the 1998–99 season at Pro Tour New York. Despite a strong finish at Pro Tour Chicago, missing the top eight only on tiebreakers, Wiegersma was unable to establish himself on the Pro Tour in the season following his debut. In the season after that Wiegersma got his first taste of success. He played all but one of the Pro Tours that year, and made the top four of Grand Prix Turin with teammates Kamiel Cornelissen and Tom van de Logt.

In 2001–02 Wiegersma managed to make the top eight of a Pro Tour for the first time. At Pro Tour New Orleans he reached the semifinals before losing to Tomi Walamies for a third-place finish. To follow up on this performance, Wiegersma made the top eight of three Grand Prix, in Lisbon, Heidelberg, and Naples, that season.

By comparison, 2002–03 was a much less impressive season for Wiegersma. His only notable finish was a fifth-place finish at Grand Prix Prague. However, the following season was very successful. Wiegersma started the season with success in the Rochester Draft format. He finished eighth at Grand Prix Lyon and won Grand Prix Götheborg, both of which used that format. Later that season, Wiegersma made his second Pro Tour top at Pro Tour Kobe. Another semifinal exit, this time losing to Gabriel Nassif, saw him finish fourth. His success that season did not stop there. With teammates Kamiel Cornelissen, and Jeroen Remie, Wiegersma won Pro Tour Seattle, defeating Tsuyoshi Ikeda, Itaru Ishida, and Jin Okomoto in the finals.

After failing to make the top eight of any Pro Tours or Grand Prix events in 2005, Wiegersma returned to the top eight at the premier event level in 2006. That season, he made the top eight of four Grand Prix across three continents, finishing 3rd at Grand Prix Barcelona and Yamagata, 8th at Grand Prix Toronto, and fifth at Grand Prix Malmö. And while he didn't make any Pro Tour top eights, he showed remarkable consistency by finishing in the money at every Pro Tour in the 2005 and 2006 seasons, with the exception of Pro Tour Los Angeles 2005.

Wiegersma's next top eight finishes came in 2008. He finished fourth at Grand Prix Birmingham, and won Grand Prix Indianapolis. That same year, he was inducted into the Magic: The Gathering Hall of Fame with Dirk Baberowski, Mike Turian, Olivier Ruel, and Ben Rubin.

Since the 2012 season, Wiegersma has been a member of the team now known as 'The Pantheon', alongside players such as Kai Budde, Jon Finkel, and Gabriel Nassif. At Pro Tour Dark Ascension in 2012 he made his first Pro Tour Top 8 since winning Pro Tour Seattle in 2004, and in 2015 he finished third at Pro Tour Fate Reforged. Later that season, at Grand Prix Montreal, he made the top of a Grand Prix event for the first time in seven years, and he finished the 2014–15 season with enough Pro Points to earn Platinum membership in the Pro Player Club as well as captainship of the Dutch National team for the 2015 World Magic Cup.

== Accomplishments ==
Season	Event type	Location	Format	Date	Rank
2000–01	Grand Prix	Turin	Team Limited	26–27 May 2001	4
2001–02	Pro Tour	New Orleans	Extended	1–4 November 2001	3
2001–02	Grand Prix	Lisbon	Extended	19–20 January 2002	8
2001–02	Grand Prix	Heidelberg	Sealed and Booster Draft	9–10 February 2002	5
2001–02	Grand Prix	Naples	Sealed and Booster Draft	6–7 April 2002	2
2002–03	Grand Prix	Prague	Sealed and Booster Draft	12–13 April 2003	5
2003–04	Grand Prix	Lyon	Rochester Draft	25–26 October 2003	8
2003–04	Grand Prix	Gothenburg	Rochester Draft	22–23 November 2003	1
2003–04	Pro Tour	Kobe	Block Constructed	27–29 February 2004	4
2003–04	Pro Tour	Seattle	Team Limited	9–11 July 2004	1
2006	Grand Prix	Barcelona	Sealed and Booster Draft	8–9 April 2006	3
2006	Grand Prix	Toronto	Sealed and Booster Draft	3–4 June 2006	8
2006	Grand Prix	Malmö	Sealed and Booster Draft	22–23 July 2006	5
2006	Grand Prix	Yamagata	Sealed and Booster Draft	18–19 November 2006	3
2008	Grand Prix	Birmingham	Block Constructed	31 May–1 June 2008	4
2008	Grand Prix	Indianapolis	Sealed and Booster Draft	21–22 June 2008	1
2012	Pro Tour	Honolulu	Standard and Booster Draft	10–12 February 2012	8
2014–15	Pro Tour	Washington, D.C.	Modern and Booster Draft	6–8 February 2015	3
2014–15	Grand Prix	Montreal	Sealed and Booster Draft	4–5 July 2015	4
2016–17	Grand Prix	Louisville	Team Limited	10–11 September 2016	4

Last updated: 15 October 2016
Source: Wizards.com

Preceded by Ruben Snijdewind	Dutch National Champion; 2012	Succeeded by Raymond Veenis
Preceded by Frank Karsten	Dutch National Champion; 2015	Succeeded by Incumbent
