= William Jensen =

American Magic: The Gathering player (born 1982)

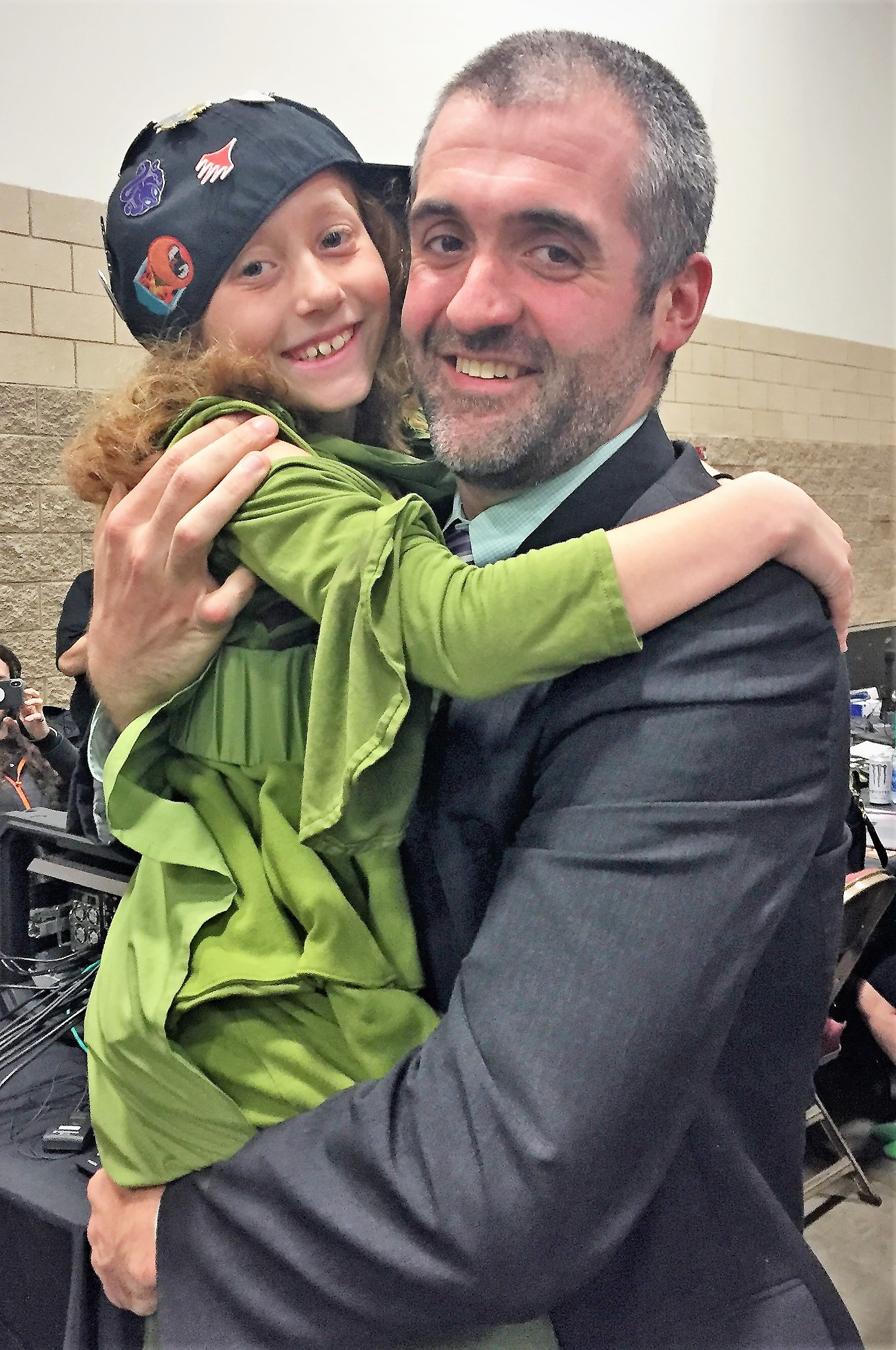
- Jensen (right) with young competitive Magic player Dana Fischer in 2019
- Nickname: Huey
- Born: July 27, 1982 (age 44)
- Nationality: American
- Pro Tour debut: Pro Tour Rome 1998
- Winnings: US$375,395
- Pro Tour wins (Top 8): 1 (5)
- Grand Prix wins (Top 8): 6 (24)
- Lifetime Pro Points: 389
- Planeswalker Level: 48 (Archmage)

William "Huey" Jensen (born July 26, 1982) is an American Magic: The Gathering player. He won Pro Tour Boston 2003, and has finished in the top 8 of four additional Pro Tours. He also has 24 Grand Prix top eights, including six wins. Jensen is one of the few players to have beaten Kai Budde in the elimination rounds of a Pro Tour. In 2013 he was voted into the Hall of Fame. He is the current record holder of most Grand Prix top eight finishes within a single season, with eight in 2013–14. He is also the 2017 Magic World Champion.

== Magic: The Gathering career ==
William Jensen started playing Magic in 1995 at age 13, and his first Pro Tour was Pro Tour Rome 1998. One year later, at Pro Tour London 1999, he got his major breakthrough by making the top 8, ultimately finishing 6th, losing to eventual champion Kyle Rose. Only one month later, at Grand Prix San Diego, Jensen experienced his first Grand Prix success by not only making the top 8, but winning the event.

The 2000–01 Pro Tour season started with Jensen winning the inaugural Masters event, beating among others eventual Hall of Famers Nicolai Herzog, Olivier Ruel, and Bob Maher en route to the title. Jensen continued to be a mainstay on the professional scene, putting up additional Grand Prix top 8s, including another win at Grand Prix Pittsburgh 2000, as well as solid Pro Tour finishes. In 2003, Jensen returned to the top 8 of the Pro Tour, finishing 8th at Pro Tour Chicago, once again losing to the eventual champion, in this case Kai Budde. However, Jensen would return to the top 8 at the very next Pro Tour, finishing 4th at Pro Tour Venice 2003.

The first Pro Tour of the next season, the 2003–04 Pro Tour season, was a Team Rochester draft Pro Tour in Boston. Teaming up with Brock Parker and Matt Linde as 'The Brockafellars', Jensen won his first Pro Tour. The team defeated the German team 'Phoenix Foundation', the winners of the previous two Team Limited Pro Tours, with Jensen defeating Kai Budde 2–0 in his match. In the finals, they faced the Norwegian team 'Unoriginal Slackers', where Jensen won his match 2–0 over Jake Smith. Jensen continued to play on the pro circuit for one more year, his final Pro Tour being the 2004 World Championships, before he retired from professional play. Jensen has cited being tired of traveling and friends leaving the scene as the reasons for quitting.

In 2012, despite not having played a professional event in almost eight years, William Jensen was among the top candidates for getting voted into the Hall of Fame. He eventually missed by a single vote, but received a special invitation to play at Pro Tour Return to Ravnica. He playtested for the event with team StarCityGames Black (currently known as Team Pantheon), featuring players like Jon Finkel, Gabriel Nassif, and Jelger Wiegersma. This reignited his interest in competitive Magic. One year later, he was voted into the Hall of Fame, garnering a total of 59.97% of the votes.

The 2013–14 Pro Tour season was Jensen's comeback season. He won his third Grand Prix shortly after being voted into the Hall of Fame by defeating Neal Oliver in the final of Grand Prix Oakland. He continued to make additional Grand Prix top 8s throughout the season, though without winning another one. At the end of the season, he had made the top 8 of eight total Grand Prix, setting the record for most Grand Prix top 8 finishes within a single season. In the final event of the season, Pro Tour Magic 2015 in Portland, Jensen made his fifth Pro Tour top 8, finishing 7th. His overall performance in the season earned him an invitation to the 2014 World Championship.

The very first Grand Prix of the 2014–15 Pro Tour season, Grand Prix Portland, was won by Jensen's team, 'Peach Garden Oath', with teammates Reid Duke and Owen Turtenwald. This was Jensen's fourth Grand Prix win. At the 2014 World Championship, Jensen came close to reaching the top 4, but lost the last round of Swiss to Yuuya Watanabe, resulting in an 8th-place finish. He finished the season on 47 points, enough for Platinum status in the Pro Player Club, but not enough to qualify for the 2015 World Championships.

In 2022, Jensen took a job at Wizards of the Coast working on competitive play as the Director of Play Programs. This role requires him to refrain from competitive play himself.

=== Achievements ===
Season	Event type	Location	Format	Date	Rank
1999–2000	Pro Tour	London	Block Constructed	October 15–17, 1999	6
1999–2000	Grand Prix	San Diego	Limited	November 20–21, 1999	1
1999–2000	Grand Prix	Philadelphia	Extended	February 19–20, 2000	5
1999–2000	Grand Prix	Cannes	Team Limited	February 26–27, 2000	4
1999–2000	Grand Prix	Pittsburgh	Team Limited	June 24–25, 2000	1
2000–01	Masters	New York City	Extended	September 29–October 1, 2000	1
2000–01	Grand Prix	Detroit	Limited	March 31–April 1, 2001	5
2000–01	Nationals	Orlando	Standard and Booster Draft	June 1–3, 2001	6
2001–02	Grand Prix	Houston	Extended	January 5–6, 2002	3
2001–02	Grand Prix	Milwaukee	Standard	May 11–12, 2002	7
2002–03	Pro Tour	Chicago	Rochester Draft	January 17–19, 2003	8
2002–03	Pro Tour	Venice	Block Constructed	March 21–23, 2003	4
2003–04	Pro Tour	Boston	Team Limited	September 12–14, 2003	1
2003–04	Grand Prix	Orlando	Block Constructed	July 24–25, 2004	5
2013–14	Grand Prix	Oakland	Limited	August 24–25, 2013	1
2013–14	Grand Prix	Louisville	Standard	October 19–20, 2013	8
2013–14	Grand Prix	Toronto	Limited	November 30–December 1, 2013	3
2013–14	Grand Prix	Dallas/Fort Worth	Standard	December 7–8, 2013	2
2013–14	Grand Prix	Barcelona	Team Limited	March 1–2, 2014	3
2013–14	Grand Prix	Philadelphia	Limited	April 12–13, 2014	6
2013–14	Grand Prix	Atlanta	Limited	May 24–25, 2014	3
2013–14	Grand Prix	Washington DC	Limited	June 28–29, 2014	5
2013–14	Pro Tour	Portland	Standard and Booster Draft	August 1–3, 2014	7
2014–15	Grand Prix	Portland	Team Limited	August 9–10, 2014	1
2014–15	Grand Prix	Denver	Standard	January 3–4, 2015	6
2015–16	Grand Prix	Detroit	Team Limited	August 15–16, 2015	3
2015–16	Grand Prix	Washington, D.C.	Team Limited	March 12–13, 2016	3
2015–16	Grand Prix	Barcelona	Limited	April 16–17, 2016	3
2016–17	Grand Prix	San Antonio	Team Unified Modern	April 1–2, 2017	2
2016–17	Grand Prix	Cleveland	Team Limited	June 23–25, 2017	1
2016–17	Grand Prix	Kyoto	Limited	July 21–23, 2017	1
2016–18	Grand Prix	Providence	Team Limited	September 30–October 1, 2017	2
2017-18	Worlds	Boston	Standard and Booster Draft	October 6–8, 2017	1

Last updated: October 12, 2017
Source: Wizards.com

== Personal life ==
On November 10, 2016, Jensen came out as gay on Twitter.
