= Zvi Mowshowitz =

American writer and Magic: The Gathering player

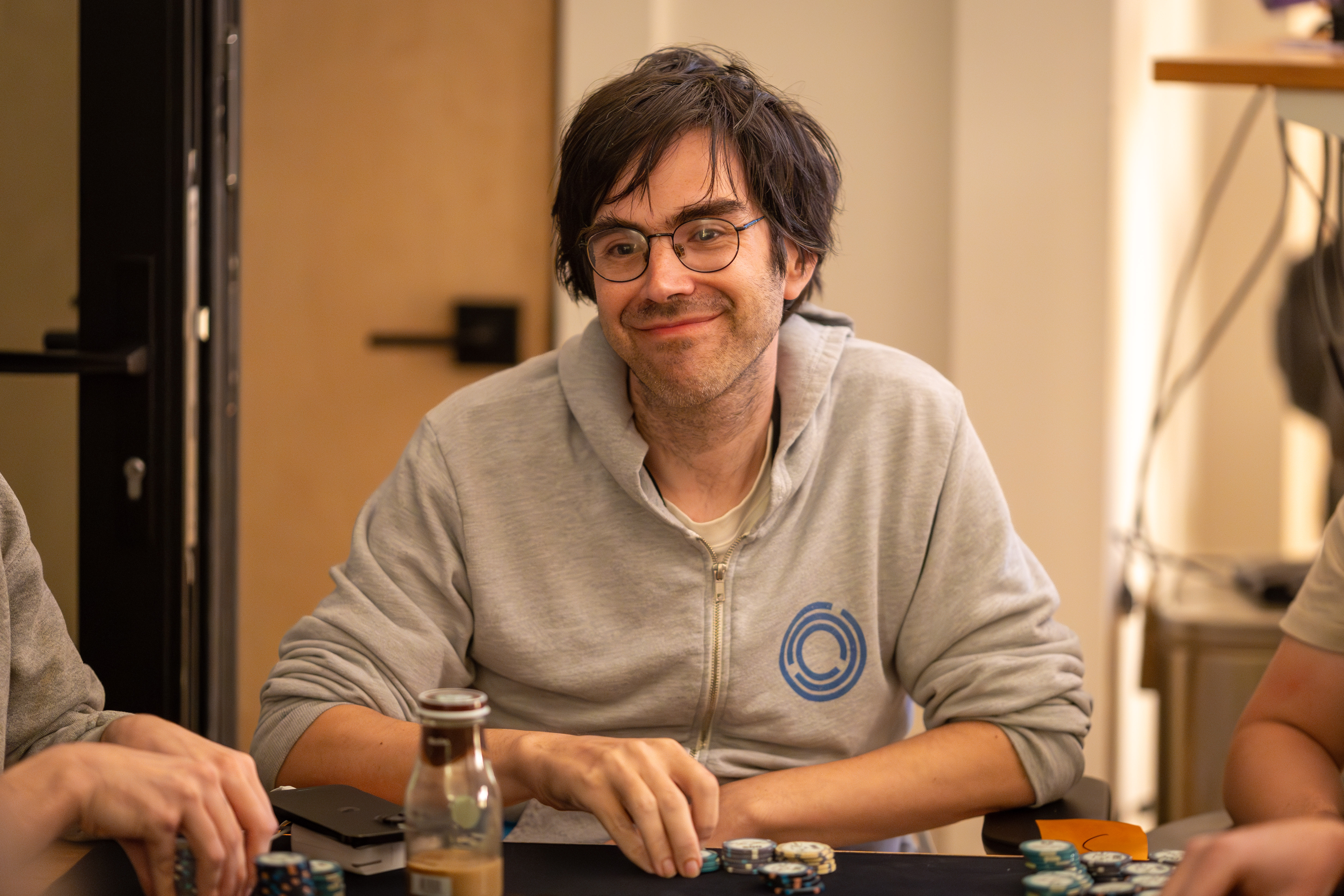
- Zvi Mowshowitz playing poker at Manifold's Manifest conference in 2023
- Nationality: American
- Pro Tour debut: 1998 Pro Tour Los Angeles
- Winnings: US$ 147,010
- Pro Tour wins (Top 8): 1 (4)
- Grand Prix wins (Top 8): 2 (9)
- Lifetime Pro Points: 261
- Planeswalker Level: 47 (Archmage)

Zvi Mowshowitz is an American writer and member of the rationalist community who primarily discusses new developments in artificial intelligence. He is a former competitive Magic: The Gathering player and was CEO of MetaMed. He was inducted into the Magic Hall of Fame in 2007.

== Career ==
Mowshowitz is an alumnus of Columbia University and holds a bachelor's degree in mathematics. He co-founded and was the CEO of MetaMed, a medical research analysis firm, which shut down in 2015. He has worked at Jane Street Capital, and has worked for the gambling industry in Las Vegas. He was developing a blockchain game, Emergents, in 2020.

=== Magic: The Gathering ===
Mowshowitz held a developer intern position at Wizards of the Coast R&D in 2005. He created the deck TurboZvi. His first-place finishes at major competitions were the 1999 World Championships as part of the four-person United States national team, the 2001 Pro Tour Tokyo, and two 2003 Grand Prix. He has placed in the top eight of four Pro Tours, and earned over $140,000 playing Magic competitively. In 2007, Mowshowitz was elected into the Magic Hall of Fame.

Season	Event type	Location	Format	Date	Rank
1998–99	Grand Prix	Boston	Block Constructed	5–6 September 1998	4
1998–99	Pro Tour	New York	Block Constructed	30 April–2 May 1999	3
1998–99	Grand Prix	Washington D.C.	Limited	19–20 June 1999	4
1998–99	Nationals		Special	2–4 July 1999	4
1998–99	Worlds	Yokohama	National team	4–8 August 1999	1
1999–00	Invitational	Kuala Lumpur	Special	2–5 March 2000	3
2000–01	Grand Prix	Manchester	Limited	7–8 October 2000	8
2000–01	Pro Tour	Chicago	Standard	1–3 December 2000	7
2000–01	Pro Tour	Tokyo	Block Constructed	16–18 March 2001	1
2000–01	Masters	Barcelona	Booster Draft	1–4 May 2001	4
2001–02	Pro Tour	New York	Team Limited	7–9 September 2001	3
2001–02	Masters	New Orleans	Booster Draft	31 October–3 November 2001	5
2001–02	Masters	Osaka	Team Limited	14–17 March 2002	5
2001–02	Grand Prix	New Jersey	Team Limited	29–30 June 2002	2
2002–03	Grand Prix	New Orleans	Extended	3–4 January 2003	1
2002–03	Grand Prix	Boston	Limited	22–23 February 2003	7
2002–03	Masters	Yokohama	Booster Draft	8–11 May 2003	5
2002–03	Grand Prix	Pittsburgh	Team Limited	31 May–1 June 2003	1
2003–04	Grand Prix	Atlanta	Standard	29–30 August 2003	5
2003–04	Invitational	Los Angeles	Special	11–12 May 2004	4
2012–13	Grand Prix	Portland	Modern	11–12 May 2013	3

Last updated: 12 May 2013
Source: Hall of Fame profile; Grand Prix results

Mowshowitz has written about Magic for several outlets, including the official Magic website.

=== Later career ===
Mowshowitz is on the board of directors for the Center for Applied Rationality, and is a member of the rationalist community. He also founded Balsa Research, a nonprofit think tank which advocated for the repeal of the Jones Act, increasing the housing supply, and reform of the National Environmental Policy Act. In 2023, Mowshowitz wrote an article for Vox on the topic of AI safety.

Mowshowitz has a Substack blog named "Don't Worry About the Vase", where he writes about AI.

== Personal life ==
Mowshowitz is the son of American biochemist Deborah Mowshowitz. His parents have both worked as Columbia University professors.

Preceded by (United States) United States; Matt Linde; Mike Long; Bryce Currence; Jon Finkel	Magic: The Gathering Team World Champion; With: John Hunka; Kyle Rose; Charles Kornblith; 1999	Succeeded by (United States) United States; Jon Finkel; Chris Benafel; Frank Hernandez; Aaron Forsythe
