= Baberowski =

Baberowski is a Polish language habitational surname for someone from a place called Baberow. Notable people with the name include:

- Dirk Baberowski, German professional Magic: The Gathering player
- Jörg Baberowski (1961), German historian
