= Gamers Helping Gamers =

American nonprofit organization assisting students with college tuition

Gamers Helping Gamers is an American nonprofit organization that assists aspiring college students who play the collectable card game Magic: The Gathering by awarding tuition scholarships.

== History ==
A small group of dedicated Magic: The Gathering players founded Gamers Helping Gamers in 2012. Aspiring scholarship recipients can apply for the funds by submitting a FAFSA form, a high school transcript, and a series of essay responses. As of 2013, the scholarship awards $5,000 a year for college.

=== Scholarship recipients ===
- 2012: Dylan Fay, Douglas Johnson
- 2013: Isaac Goldstein
- 2014: Nathan Calvin, Brandi Mason, Kenneth Siry
- 2015: Lirek Kulik, Dylan Quinn
- 2016: Faolan Sugarman-Lash, Jacob Schliesman, Oliver Tiu
- 2017: August Peterson, Autumn Cook
- 2018: Carter Newman, Clay Spicklemire
- 2019: Jacob Maro, Roen Blanke
- 2020: Makena Waldron, David Phan

As of 2021, the board of directors of Gamers Helping Gamers is Timothy McKenna (President), Eric Berger (Secretary) Jon Finkel (Treasurer), Chris Pikula, Robert Maher, Jr., Matthew Wang, Daniel O'Mahoney-Schwartz, and Jamie Parke.
