= Masters Series =

The Masters Series may refer to:

- ATP World Tour Masters 1000, in tennis
- League of Legends Master Series, top level League of Legends league based in Taipei for Taiwan, Macau, and Hong Kong
- Masters Series (Magic: The Gathering)
- Masters Series (School of Visual Arts)
