= Raphaël Lévy =

French Magic: The Gathering player

- Born: September 25, 1981 (age 45); Toulouse, France
- Nationality: French
- Pro Tour debut: 1997 Pro Tour Paris
- Winnings: $526,463
- Pro Tour wins (Top 8): 0 (6)
- Grand Prix wins (Top 8): 6 (23)
- Lifetime Pro Points: 695

Raphaël Lévy is a professional Magic: The Gathering player. He was inducted to the Magic: The Gathering Pro Tour Hall of Fame in November 2006. He is the first player to have been inducted while active on the Pro Tour. He is one of only six players to have won a Grand Prix on three different continents (the others being Shuhei Nakamura, Alex Shvartsman, Carlos Romão, Yuuya Watanabe, and Martin Juza). He holds the second most lifetime Pro Points behind Shuhei Nakamura.

== Career ==
Raphaël Lévy began his Pro Tour career in 1997 at Pro Tour Paris. A 130th-place finish meant he did not qualify for the next Pro Tour. After missing Pro Tour New York, he qualified for the 1997 World Championship, and did not miss a Pro Tour until Pro Tour Ixalan due to the birth of his child.

Lévy first began to attract attention the following season first by winning Grand Prix Lyon and then reaching the top eight of the World Championship. He was the only non-American in an impressive top eight whose players now have a combined 37 Pro Tour Sunday appearances.

In 1998-99, Lévy continued to perform well with fourth-place finishes in Grand Prix Barcelona and the European Championship in Berlin. Before the turn of the millennium, Lévy put up his second Pro Tour Top eight. A semifinal loss to Brian Davis saw Lévy put up yet another fourth-place finish.

Over the following six years, Lévy did well without standing out. He remained continuously qualified for the Pro Tour, and put up nine Grand Prix top eights. However, his third Pro Tour Top Eight would not come until seven years after his second. In 2006, Lévy's two Pro Tour Top Eights and streak of then 47 consecutive Pro Tours attended were enough to get him inducted into the Magic: The Gathering Hall of Fame. This honour served to reinvigorate Lévy's game. The following season, he won back to back Grand Prix in Dallas and Singapore. He made his third Pro Tour Top eight in Yokohama, making him the first Hall of Famer to make it back to the Sunday stage.

Since then, Lévy has returned to putting up solid Pro Tour finishes without reaching the top eight, and has put up five more Grand Prix top eights, one of which was his fourth Grand Prix title.

In 2012, at Pro Tour Dark Ascension Lévy earned 6 pro points equalling the 500 lifetime pro points record of Kai Budde. Raphael Levy also became the 2012 French National Champion by being the highest ranked French player after Pro Tour Avacyn Restored, and as a result was part of the French National Team at the inaugural 2012 World Magic Cup, where they finished in 10th place. Levy was in 2013 once again the highest ranking French player, and at the 2013 World Magic Cup he captained the French team to victory. The win qualified Levy for the 2014 World Championship, where he finished 17th.

During the 2015–2016 season, Lévy added two GP trophies (making it 6) to his résumé: one in Madison in Battle for Zendikar Limited and the second one in Manchester in Standard.

In 2019, after racking up good results over the season, he qualified to both World Championship XXVI and the MPL for the following seasons as one of the top 4 Challengers.

While the pandemic shut down live tournament, Lévy reached the top 8 of three major tournaments: the Players Tour Finals (8th place), the Grand Finals (4th place) and the Strixhaven Championship (8th place).

== Accomplishments ==
=== Top 8 appearances ===
Season	Event type	Location	Format	Date	Rank
1997–98	Grand Prix	Lyon	Extended	7–8 February 1998	1
1997–98	Worlds	Seattle	Special	12–16 August 1998	4
1998–99	Grand Prix	Barcelona	Sealed and Booster Draft	6–7 February 1999	4
1998–99	European Championship	Berlin	Special	10–12 July 1999	4
1999–00	Pro Tour	Chicago	Extended	3–5 December 1999	4
1999–00	European Championship	Paris	Special	14–16 July 2000	2
2000–01	Grand Prix	Gothenburg	Sealed and Booster Draft	24–25 March 2001	3
2001–02	Grand Prix	Barcelona	Sealed and Booster Draft	23–24 March 2002	7
2001–02	Grand Prix	Naples	Sealed and Booster Draft	6–7 April 2002	7
2002–03	Grand Prix	Prague	Sealed and Booster Draft	12–13 April 2003	2
2003–04	Grand Prix	Madrid	Sealed and Booster Draft	21–22 February 2004	4
2005	Grand Prix	Paris	Sealed and Rochester Draft	27–28 November 2004	4
2005	Nationals	Aix-en-Provence	Special	30–31 July 2005	8
2006	Grand Prix	Cardiff	Sealed and Booster Draft	25–26 March 2006	7
2006	Grand Prix	Barcelona	Sealed and Booster Draft	8–9 April 2006	2
2006	Grand Prix	Phoenix	Sealed and Booster Draft	2–3 September 2006	3
2007	Grand Prix	Dallas	Extended	24–25 February 2007	1
2007	Grand Prix	Singapore	Extended	3–4 March 2007	1
2007	Pro Tour	Yokohama	Block Constructed	20–22 April 2007	6
2008	Grand Prix	Brussels	Sealed and Booster Draft	3–4 May 2008	3
2008	Grand Prix	Birmingham	Block Constructed	30 May–1 June 2008	3
2008	Grand Prix	Manila	Block Constructed	30–31 August 2008	7
2011	Grand Prix	Milan	Sealed and Booster Draft	8–9 October 2011	2
2012	Grand Prix	Austin	Sealed and Booster Draft	7–8 January 2012	1
2013–14	World Magic Cup	Amsterdam	National team	2–4 August 2013	1
2013–14	Grand Prix	Prague	Sealed and Booster Draft	31 August–1 September 2013	8
2015–16	Grand Prix	Madison	Sealed and Booster Draft	9-11 October 2015	1
2015–16	Grand Prix	Manchester	Standard	28-29 May 2016	1
2016-17	Grand Prix	Rotterdam	Team Limited	12–13 November 2016	3
2018-19	Grand Prix	Strasbourg	Sealed and Booster Draft	15–16 February 2019	4
2020	Pro Tour	Online	Standard	24–26 July 2020	8
2020	Pro Tour	Online	Special	09–11 October 2020	4
2021	Pro Tour	Online	Special	04–06 June 2021	8

Last updated: 12 June 2021
Source: Event Coverage at Wizards.com

Other accomplishments

- Magic: The Gathering Hall of Fame class of 2006
- Most Lifetime Pro Points
- Most Pro Tour appearances (87 as of Pro Tour Magic Origins)

Preceded by Raphaël Lévy	Magic French National Champion; 2012–2013	Succeeded by Jérémy Dezani
Preceded by (Taiwan) Chinese Taipei; Kuo Tzu-Ching; Cheng Tung-yi; Yang Yu-min; Paul Renie	Magic: The Gathering Team World Champion; With: Timothée Simonot; Yann Guthmann; Stephane Soubrier; 2013	Succeeded by (Denmark) Denmark; Martin Müller; Simon Nielsen; Thomas Enevoldsen; Lars Birch
