= Marco Blume =

German Magic: The Gathering player

- Nationality: German
- Winnings: US$106,955
- Pro Tour wins (Top 8): 2 (3)
- Grand Prix wins (Top 8): 1 (1)
- Median Pro Tour Finish: 117
- Planeswalker Level: 42 (Battlemage)

Marco Blume is a German Magic: The Gathering player. He is one of the most successful professional players. He has won two Pro Tours and one Masters as a member of team Phoenix Foundation, his teammates being Kai Budde and Dirk Baberowski. He also won a German individually national championship in 1999. Blume is currently the Head of Sportsbook at Pinnacle Sports.

== Top 8 appearances ==
Season	Event type	Location	Format	Date	Rank
1998–99	Nationals	Dietzenbach	Standard		1
1998–99	Worlds	Yokohama	National team	4–8 August 1999	2
2001–02	Pro Tour	New York City	Team Limited	7–9 September 2001	1
2001–02	Masters	Osaka	Team Limited	14–17 March 2002	1
2002–03	Pro Tour	Boston	Team Limited	27–29 September 2002	1
2002–03	Masters	Venice	Team Limited	20–23 March 2003	5
2003–04	Grand Prix	Atlanta	Standard	29–31 August 2003	1
2003–04	Pro Tour	Boston	Team Limited	12–14 September 2003	4

Last updated: 31 July 2009
Source: Wizards.com Wizards.com

Preceded by Dirk Hein	Magic German National Champion; 1999	Succeeded by André Konstanczer
