= Masters Series (Magic: The Gathering) =

Card game tournaments

The Masters Series or simply Masters were single-elimination Magic: The Gathering tournaments open to the most accomplished players only. These tournaments awarded cash prizes upon entrance and were held at several Pro Tours each season. The first predecessor to the Masters Series, named Team Challenge, was held at the 2000 Pro Tour New York. In the following seasons Masters were held at four different Pro Tours each season. The last Masters was held at Pro Tour Yokohama. Ben Rubin was the most successful player at the Masters Series, being the only player to win two individual events. Ryan Fuller is the only other player to win two events - one individually and one as part of team AlphaBetaUnlimited.com.

After the 2002–03 season the cash that would have gone into the Masters Series prizes was instead used for a final payout at the end of the season based on Pro Points. This payout was in turn replaced by the Pro Player's Club two years later.

== Masters champions ==
*	Elected to the Magic: The Gathering Hall of Fame

Season	Location	Winner	Runner-up	Result	Format	Ref.
1999–00	New York City	Black Ops; Antoine Ruel*; Olivier Ruel*; Florent Jeudon	Antarctica; Jon Finkel*; Steven O'Mahoney-Schwartz*; Daniel O'Mahoney-Schwartz	2–1	Team Rochester Draft	
2000–01	New York City	William Jensen*	Jason Zilla	2–1	Extended	
2000–01	Chicago	Ben Rubin*	Jon Finkel*	2–0	Booster Draft	
2000–01	Tokyo	AlphaBetaUnlimited.com; Chris Benafel; Noah Boeken; Ryan Fuller	Panzer Hunter; Reiji Ando; Itaru Ishida; Momose Kazuyuki	2–1	Team Rochester Draft	
2000–01	Barcelona	Ben Rubin*	Jay Elarar	2–0	Block Constructed	
2001–02	New Orleans	Michael Pustilnik	Chris Benafel	2–0	Booster Draft	
2001–02	San Diego	Ryan Fuller	Dave Humpherys*	2–0	Standard	
2001–02	Osaka	Phoenix Foundation; Dirk Baberowski*; Marco Blume; Kai Budde*	Panzer Hunter; Reiji Ando; Itaru Ishida; Momose Kazuyuki	2–1	Team Rochester Draft	
2001–02	Nice	Alexander Witt	Justin Gary	2–1	Extended	
2002–03	Houston	Jens Thorén	Gary Wise*	2–0	Booster Draft	
2002–03	Chicago	Franck Canu	Ken Ho	2–0	Standard	
2002–03	Venice	PS2; Masahiro Kuroda; Katsuhiro Mori; Masahiko Morita	2020; Elijah Pollock; David Rood; Steven Wolfman	2–1	Team Rochester Selective service	
2002–03	Yokohama	Bob Maher*	Gabriel Nassif*	2–0	Extended	
