= Jens Thorén =

Swedish player of Magic: The Gathering

- Nationality: (Sweden) Swedish
- Winnings: US$94,095
- Pro Tour wins (Top 8): 0 (2)
- Grand Prix wins (Top 8): 0 (4)
- Lifetime Pro Points: 149
- Planeswalker Level: 43 (Battlemage)

Jens Thorén is a former professional Magic: The Gathering player from Sweden. He is best known for winning the 2002 Magic Invitational and finishing in the top 4 of two Pro Tours in a row (San Diego and Osaka) in the 2001–02 season. That season, he also finished second in the Player of the Year race to Kai Budde. He won the Masters tournament in Houston the following season. After winning the Magic Invitational, a version of the card he designed was printed in Mirrodin as Solemn Simulacrum.

== Accomplishments ==
Season	Event type	Location	Format	Date	Rank
2000–01	Grand Prix	Helsinki	Rochester Draft	28–29 October 2000	8
2000–01	Grand Prix	Prague	Sealed and Booster Draft	10–11 March 2001	2
2000–01	European Championship	Milan	Special	29 June–1 July 2001	5
2001–02	Pro Tour	San Diego	Rochester Draft	10–13 January 2002	2
2001–02	Pro Tour	Osaka	Block Constructed	15–17 March 2002	4
2001–02	Masters	Nice	Extended	3–5 May 2002	5
2002–03	Grand Prix	Copenhagen	Rochester Draft	12–13 October 2002	6
2002–03	Invitational	Seattle	Special	18–20 October 2002	1
2002–03	Masters	Houston	Booster Draft	8–10 November 2002	1
2002–03	Grand Prix	Amsterdam	Team Limited	7–8 June 2003	3
2003–04	Invitational	Los Angeles	Special	11–13 May 2004	5
2008	Nationals	Sweden	Standard and Booster Draft	September 2008	6

Last updated: 7 April 2009
Source: wizards.com

Preceded by (Germany) Kai Budde	Magic Invitational Champion; 2002	Succeeded by (United States) Bob Maher, Jr.
