= Magic: The Gathering Pro Tour season 1999–2000 =

1999–2000 Pro Tour season
- Pro Player of the Year: (United States) Bob Maher, Jr.
- Rookie of the Year: (United States) Brian Davis
- World Champion: (United States) Jon Finkel
- Pro Tours: 6
- Grands Prix: 20
- Start of season: 3 September 1999
- End of season: 6 August 2000

The 1999–2000 Pro Tour season was the fifth season of the Magic: The Gathering Pro Tour. It began on 3 September 1999 with Pro Tour Boston and ended on 6 August 2000 with the conclusion of 2000 World Championship in Brussels. The season consisted of twenty Grand Prixs, and six Pro Tours, located in Washington D.C., London, Chicago, Los Angeles, New York, and Brussels. At the end of the season Bob Maher, Jr. was awarded the Pro Player of the year title.

== Mode ==
Six Pro Tours and 20 Grand Prix were held in the 1999–2000 season. Based on final standings Pro Points were awarded as follows:

Rank	Pro Points awarded at				
Rank	Pro Tour (individual)	Pro Tour (teams)	Grand Prix (individual)	Grand Prix (teams)	Worlds (team)
1	32	24	6	4	5
2	24	12	5	3	4
3–4	16	10	4	2	3
5–8	12	8	3	1	2
9–12	8	6	2	1	1
13–16	8	6	2	—	—
17–24	7	4	1	—	—
25–32	6	3	1	—	—
33–48	5	2	—	—	—
49–64	4	1	—	—	—
65–128	3	1	—	—	—
129+	2	1	—	—	—

== Pro Tour – Washington D.C. (3–5 September 1999) ==
Washington D.C. was the first team Pro Tour. In a high-profile Top 8 featuring six players who were later inducted into the Hall of Fame, team Your Move Games (YMG) came out on top. YMG consisted of Dave Humpherys, Rob Dougherty, and Darwin Kastle, all eventual members of the Hall of Fame.

=== Tournament data ===
Players: 243 (81 teams)
Prize Pool: $100,230
Format: Urza's Saga Team Sealed (Urza's Saga, Urza's Legacy, Urza's Destiny) – first day, Urza's Saga Team Rochester Draft (Urza's Saga-Urza's Legacy-Urza's Destiny) – final two days
Head Judge: Mike Guptil

=== Top 8 ===
Semifinals
1	Game Empire	2
4	THL
2	Your Move Games	2
3	Antarctica

Semi-finals
Game Empire
Your Move Games	2

=== Final standings ===
Place	Team	Player	Prize	Pro Points	Comment
1	Your Move Games	(United States) Rob Dougherty	$30,000	24	2nd Final day
1	Your Move Games	(United States) Dave Humpherys	$30,000	24	2nd Final day
1	Your Move Games	(United States) Darwin Kastle	$30,000	24	4th Final day
2	Game Empire	(United States) Kurt Burgner	$15,000	12	2nd Final day
2	Game Empire	(United States) Alan Comer	$15,000	12	3rd Final day
2	Game Empire	(United States) Brian Selden	$15,000	12	2nd Final day
3	Antarctica	(United States) Jon Finkel	$9,000	10	6th Final day
3	Antarctica	(United States) Steven O'Mahoney-Schwartz	$9,000	10	3rd Final day
3	Antarctica	(United States) Daniel O'Mahoney-Schwartz	$9,000	10	
4	THL	(United States) Marc Aquino	$7,500	10	
4	THL	(United States) Richard Jones	$7,500	10	
4	THL	(United States) Drew McLean	$7,500	10	

== Grand Prixs – Tohoku, Memphis, Lisbon ==
GP Tohoku (11–12 September)

1. (Japan) Higashino Masayuki
2. (Japan) Kazuyuki Momose
3. (Japan) Satoshi Nakamura
4. (Japan) Itaru Ishida
5. (Japan) Toshiki Tsukamoto
6. (Japan) Ayumi Hidaka
7. (Japan) Hiroshi Harada
8. (Japan) Yuichi Taguchi

GP Memphis (18–19 September)

1. (United States) Michael Pustilnik
2. (United States) Mike Heffern
3. (United States) Kyle Kloeckner
4. (United States) Matthew Norton
5. (United States) Adrian Sullivan
6. (United States) David Jafari
7. (United States) Ric Watts
8. (United States) Matt Rauseo

GP Lisbon (25–26 September)

1. (Portugal) Helder Coelho
2. (Portugal) Paolo Cruz
3. (France) Stephane Gentric
4. (Portugal) Rui Mariani
5. (England) Pedro Marcos
6. (United States) Alex Shvartsman
7. (Portugal) Kuniyoshi Ishii
8. (Spain) Hector Fuentes

== Pro Tour – London (15–17 October 1999) ==
Kyle Rose won Pro Tour London, defeating Austrian Thomas Preyer in the finals. Darwin Kastle's back to back Top 8 appearances in Washington and London brought him to five final day appearance in his career.

=== Tournament data ===
Players: 310
Prize pool: $151,635
Format: Urza's Saga Booster Draft (Urza's Saga-Urza's Legacy-Urza's Destiny)
Head Judge: Carl Crook

=== Top 8 ===
Quarter-finals
1	Mike Bregoli	3
8	Darwin Kastle	0
5	Kyle Rose	3
4	William Jensen	0
3	Gunnar Refsdahl	2
6	Thomas Preyer	3
7	Marc Hernandez	0
2	Ben Rubin	3

Semi-finals
Mike Bregoli	0
Kyle Rose	3
Thomas Preyer	3
Ben Rubin	2

Finals
Kyle Rose	3
Thomas Preyer	1

=== Final standings ===
Place	Player	Prize	Pro Points	Comment
1	(United States) Kyle Rose	$25,000	32	3rd Final day
2	(Austria) Thomas Preyer	$15,000	24	
3	(United States) Mike Bregoli	$10,000	16	
4	(United States) Ben Rubin	$8,000	16	3rd Final day
5	(Germany) Gunnar Refsdal	$6,500	12	
6	(United States) William Jensen	$5,500	12	
7	(France) Marc Hernandez	$4,800	12	
8	(United States) Darwin Kastle	$4,300	12	5th Final day

== Grand Prixs – Kyushu, Sao Paulo, Milan, San Diego, Tours ==
GP Kyushu (30–31 October)

1. (Japan) Tadayoshi Komiya
2. (Japan) Eisaku Itadani
3. (Japan) Katsuhiro Mori
4. (Japan) Fumihiko Sano
5. (Japan) Masashiro Kuroda
6. (Japan) Masayuki Higashino
7. (Japan) Takuichi Harino
8. (Japan) Toshiki Tsukamoto

GP San Diego (20–21 November)

1. (United States) William Jensen
2. (Canada) Gary Krakower
3. (United States) David Williams
4. (United States) Charles Kornblith
5. (United States) Darwin Kastle
6. (United States) John Yoo
7. (United States) Trevor Blackwell
8. (United States) Eric James

GP São Paulo (6–7 November)

1. (Brazil) Rafael Assafi Alvarengi
2. (Argentina) Douglas Maioli
3. (Brazil) Carlos Mao
4. (United States) Alex Shvartsman
5. (Brazil) Carlos Romão
6. (Brazil) Eduardo Simao Teixeira
7. (Brazil) F. Moreira Bandeira
8. (Brazil) Rodrigo Jose Constanza

GP Tours (27–28 November)

1. (United States) Alex Shvartsman
2. (France) Nicolas Labarre
3. (France) Eric Vinh
4. (France) Franck Canu
5. (Norway) Christer Ljones
6. (France) Camille Gleizes
7. (Norway) Thomas F. Gundersen
8. (Denmark) Svend Geertsen

GP Milan (6–7 November)

1. (Slovenia) Ziga Fritz
2. (Switzerland) Raphael Gennari
3. (Italy) William Cavaglieri
4. (Italy) Mario Delucis
5. (Republic of Ireland) Ivan Solaja
6. (Germany) Micha Schulte-Middelich
7. (Italy) Ivan Curina
8. (Croatia) Sasa Zorc

== Pro Tour – Chicago (3–5 December 1999) ==
Bob Maher, Jr. won Pro Tour Chicago playing a blue-green-white control deck. He defeated Brian Davis in the finals 3–2. First time Pro Tour attendant Davis reportedly played so horribly, that around spectators the joke went, that Davis was the first to have played 5–0 in the finals and lost, referring to their perception that he could and should have won every single game.

=== Tournament data ===
Prize pool: $151,635
Players: 344
Format: Extended
Head Judge: Nat Fairbanks

=== Top 8 ===
Quarter-finals
1	Christian Lührs	3
8	Hector Fuentes	1
5	Bob Maher, Jr.	3
4	Dirk Baberowski	0
3	Brian Davis	3
6	Tony Dobson	1
7	Raphaël Lévy	3
2	Alan Comer	0

Semi-finals
Christian Lührs	1
Bob Maher, Jr.	3
Brian Davis	3
Raphaël Lévy	0

Finals
Bob Maher, Jr.	3
Brian Davis	2

=== Final standings ===
Place	Player	Prize	Pro Points	Comment
1	(United States) Bob Maher, Jr.	$25,000	32	
2	(United States) Brian Davis	$15,000	24	Pro Tour debut
3	(Germany) Christian Lührs	$10,000	16	2nd Final day
4	(France) Raphaël Lévy	$8,000	16	2nd Final day
5	(United States) Alan Comer	$6,500	12	4th Final day
6	(Germany) Dirk Baberowski	$5,500	12	2nd Final day
7	(England) Tony Dobson	$4,800	12	
8	(Spain) Hector Fuentes	$4,300	12	1st Spaniard in a Top 8

== Grand Prixs – Manila, Seattle, Madrid ==
GP Manila (4–5 December)

1. (Philippines) Christopher Parreñas
2. (Philippines) Frederick Salazar
3. (Philippines) Francis Robert Profeta
4. Lawrence Lagman
5. (Hong Kong) Au Yeung Hon Ming
6. (England) Andrew Buchanan
7. (Philippines) Dino Eric Yu
8. (Philippines) Ramon Allan Oca, Jr.

GP Seattle (15–16 January)

1. (United States) Bob Maher, Jr.
2. (United States) Jeremy Brower
3. (United States) Tim Kariel
4. (United States) David Price
5. (United States) Alex Shvartsman
6. (Canada) Jasar Elarar
7. (United States) Mike Hron
8. (United States) David Weitz

GP Madrid (29–30 January)

1. (Spain) Carlos Barrado
2. (Spain) Xavi Gonzales
3. (United States) Alex Shvartsman
4. (England) Tony Dobson
5. (France) Olivier Ruel
6. (Spain) Alex Dominguez Ramos
7. (Portugal) Rui Mariani
8. (Germany) Patrick Mello

== Pro Tour – Los Angeles (4–6 February 2000) ==
Trevor Blackwell defeated Chris Benafel in the finals to become Pro Tour Los Angeles champion.

=== Tournament data ===
Prize pool: $151,635
Players: 337
Format: Mercadian Masques Booster Draft (Mercadian Masques)
Head Judge: Dan Gray

=== Top 8 ===
Quarter-finals
1	Kurt Burgner	3
8	Brian Selden	0
4	Trevor Blackwell	3
5	Andrew Nishioka	0
3	Bruce Cowley	1
6	Mike Long	3
2	Erno Ekebom	0
7	Chris Benafel	3

Semi-finals
Kurt Burgner	0
Trevor Blackwell	3
Mike Long	2
Chris Benafel	3

Finals
Trevor Blackwell	3
Chris Benafel	1

=== Final standings ===
Place	Player	Prize	Pro Points	Comment
1	(United States) Trevor Blackwell	$25,000	32	
2	(United States) Chris Benafel	$15,000	24	
3	(United States) Kurt Burgner	$10,000	16	3rd Final day
4	(United States) Mike Long	$8,000	16	4th Final day
5	(Finland) Erno Ekebom	$6,500	12	
6	(United States) Bruce Cowley	$5,500	12	
7	(United States) Andrew Nishioka	$4,800	12	
8	(United States) Brian Selden	$4,300	12	3rd Final day

== Grand Prix – Taipei, Philadelphia, Cannes, Kuala Lumpur, Frankfurt ==
GP Taipei (12–13 February)

1. (Japan) Tadayoshi Komiya
2. (Japan) Tsuyoshi Fujita
3. (United States) Alex Shvartsman
4. (Taiwan) Jim Len
5. (Taiwan) Lucifar Sun
6. (Taiwan) Chi Jin Guo (Tzu-Ching Kuo)
7. (Japan) Satoshi Nakamura
8. (United States) Tobey Tamber

GP Philadelphia (19–20 February)

1. (United States) Trey Van Cleave
2. (United States) Britt Fitch
3. (United States) Scott McCord
4. (United States) John Marks
5. (United States) William Jensen
6. (United States) David Roderer
7. (United States) Brad Swan
8. (United States) Michael Bernat

GP Cannes (26–27 February)

1. Black Ops

(France) Florent Jeudon
(France) Antoine Ruel
(France) Olivier Ruel

2. New Wave

(United States) Alex Shvartsman
(Netherlands) Bram Snepvangers
(Austria) Thomas Preyer

3. Legion of Rabbits

(France) Nicolas Labarre
(France) Manuel Bevand
(France) Marie Laure Saulnier

4. The Tightans

(United States) Daniel O'Mahoney-Schwartz
(United States) William Jensen
(United States) David Williams

GP Kuala Lumpur (4–5 March)

1. (Malaysia) Ryan Soh
2. (Malaysia) Tishen Tham
3. (Malaysia) Wai Kin Au Yong
4. (Japan) Tsuyoshi Ikeda
5. (Japan) Jun Nobushita
6. (Japan) Tsutomu Yamada
7. (Singapore) Albertus Law
8. (Malaysia) Wei Ren Khoo

GP Frankfurt (8–9 April)

1. III Heroes

(Germany) Jim Herold
(Germany) Sebastian Moises
(Germany) Gunnar Refsdal

2. Hammer of Brno

(Czech Republic) Martin Laznovsky
(Czech Republic) Ivan Stanoev
(Czech Republic) Libor Marek

3. Trash A

(Czech Republic) Jakub Slemr
(Czech Republic) Ondrej Baurys
(Czech Republic) Tomas Kosicka

4. Absolute Samuels

(Germany) Daniel Steinsdorfer
(Germany) Demir Sejdiu
(Germany) Patrick Jansen

== Pro Tour – New York (14–16 April 2000) ==
Sigurd Eskeland won Pro Tour New York, defeating Warren Marsh in the finals. Eskeland played a blue control-deck with the centerpiece of the deck being Rising Waters. His opponent played the deck most present at this tournament, Rebels. PT New York is considered to be the first time where there was a dominant deck at a Pro Tour, the deck did not win the tournament.

43% of the players entering the tournament had chosen rebel decks. On the second day of the tournament rebels were even more present, comprising and unprecedented 57% of the field. These numbers were again topped by the final eight where six of eight decks were rebel decks. In contrast the winning Rising Waters deck comprised only 8.4% of the field on day one and 14.5% on day two. In the top eight the two non-rebel decks were both Rising Waters decks. Rising Waters on both days had the highest winning percentage of all decks played with 60% on day one and 53.8% on day two.

=== Tournament data ===
Players: 310
Prize pool: $151,635
Format: Mercadian Masques Block Constructed (Mercadian Masques, Nemesis)
Location: New York State Armory
Head Judge: Cyril Grillon

=== Top 8 ===
Quarter-finals
1	John Larkin	1
8	Mattias Kettil	3
5	Sigurd Eskeland	3
4	Travis Turning	1
3	Mike Bregoli	0
6	Warren Marsh	3
7	John Hunka	1
2	Ben Rubin	3

Semi-finals
Mattias Kettil	2
Sigurd Eskeland	3
Warren Marsh	3
Ben Rubin	1

Finals
Sigurd Eskeland	3
Warren Marsh	1

=== Final standings ===
Place	Player	Prize	Pro Points	Comment
1	(Norway) Sigurd Eskeland	$25,000	32	1st Norwegian to win a Pro Tour
2	(England) Warren Marsh	$15,000	24	
3	(United States) Ben Rubin	$10,000	16	4th Final day
4	(Sweden) Mattias Kettil	$8,000	16	
5	(Republic of Ireland) John Larkin	$6,500	12	1st Irish Player in a Top 8
6	(United States) Mike Bregoli	$5,500	12	2nd Final day
7	(United States) Travis Turning	$4,800	12	
8	(United States) John Hunka	$4,300	12	

=== Winner's deck ===
Sigurd Eskeland played a blue control-deck with the centerpiece of the deck being Rising Waters.

Sigurd Eskeland – 1999–2000 Pro Tour New York champion
Main Deck:		Sideboard:
4 Drake Hatchling; 4 Stinging Barrier; 4 Waterfront Bouncer; 4 Eye of Ramos; 3 Seal of Removal; 4 Gush; 4 Rising Waters; 1 Brainstorm; 3 Counterspell; 4 Thwart; 3 Daze	18 Island; 4 Rishadan Port	2 Bribery; 1 Counterspell; 1 Hoodwink; 2 Island; 3 Misdirection; 2 Rath's Edge; 1 Seal of Removal; 4 Stronghold Zeppelin

=== Team Challenge ===
The Team Challenge was a predecessor to the Masters Series events that were held from 2000 to 2003. These events were open only to the most accomplished players and awarded cash prizes even for entering the tournament. The Team Challenge at Pro Tour New York 2000 awarded $3,000 for entering the tournament, $9,000 to the runners-up team, and $15,000 to the winners. Four teams were invited to enter the tournament. In a field composed of otherwise American teams the French team Black Ops defeated Game Empire and Antarctica to win the tournament.

Semi-finals
1	Antarctica	2
4	Your Move Games	1
3	Black Ops	2
2	Game Empire	1

Finals
Antarctica	1
Black Ops	2

Team	Player	Team	Player
Antarctica	(United States) Daniel O'Mahoney-Schwartz	Game Empire	(United States) Brian Selden
Antarctica	(United States) Jon Finkel	Game Empire	(United States) Alan Comer
Antarctica	(United States) Steven O'Mahoney-Schwartz	Game Empire	(United States) Kurt Burgner
Black Ops	(France) Florent Jeudon	Your Move Games	(United States) Rob Dougherty
Black Ops	(France) Antoine Ruel	Your Move Games	(United States) Dave Humpherys
Black Ops	(France) Olivier Ruel	Your Move Games	(United States) Darwin Kastle

== Grand Prixs – Nagoya, St. Louis, Copenhagen, Pittsburgh ==
GP Nagoya (22–23 April)

1. New Wave

(United States) Alex Shvartsman
(United States) Trevor Blackwell
(Singapore) Nick Wong

2. Masato Club

(Japan) Goro Matsuo
(Japan) Jun Nobushita
(Japan) Tadayoshi Komiya

3. Godzilla

(United States) Bob Maher, Jr.
(United States) David Williams
(United States) Mike Long

4. Unluckys

(Japan) Osamu Fujita
(Japan) Ayumi Hidaka
(Japan) Takayuki Nagaoka

GP Copenhagen (17–18 June)

1. (Denmark) Niels Sanders Jensen
2. (United States) Daniel O'Mahoney-Schwartz
3. (France) Franck Canu
4. (Netherlands) Noah Boeken
5. (Germany) Gottlieb Yeh
6. (Germany) Gunnar Refsdal
7. (Netherlands) Tom van de Logt
8. (Belgium) Peter Gysemans

GP St. Louis (13–14 May)

1. Antarctica

(United States) Daniel O'Mahoney-Schwartz
(United States) Jon Finkel
(United States) Steven O'Mahoney-Schwartz

2. Dogma

(United States) Rob Liszka
(United States) Mike Heffern
(United States) Aaron Estrin

3. Your Move Games

(United States) Darwin Kastle
(United States) Rob Dougherty
(United States) Dave Humpherys

4. Hubbo

(United States) Ryan Carpenter
(United States) Bryan Hubble
(United States) Jason Opalka

GP Pittsburgh (24–25 June)

1. Huey, Ben, and Casey

(United States) William Jensen
(United States) Ben Rubin
(United States) Casey McCarrel

2. Dark Side of the Moon

(United States) Ray Tautic
(United States) Brian Lynch
(United States) Ben Halpren

3. Antarctica

(United States) Daniel O'Mahoney-Schwartz
(United States) Steven O'Mahoney-Schwartz
(United States) Jon Finkel

4. Your Move Games

(United States) Darwin Kastle
(United States) Rob Dougherty
(United States) Dave Humpherys

== 2000 World Championships – Brussels (2–6 August 2000) ==
Jon Finkel won the 2000 World Championship, defeating teammate Bob Maher, Jr. in the finals. The second place allowed Maher to take the Pro Player of the year title, surpassing Darwin Kastle in the final standings. Finkel became the second player to win two Pro Tours and the first with seven Top 8 appearances. The US team won the national team competition, also with Finkel as reigning national champion at its head.

=== Tournament data ===
Prize pool: $201,620 (individual) + $50,000 (national teams)
Players: 273
Individual formats: Formats: Mercadian Masques Booster Draft (Mercadian Masques-Nemesis-Prophecy), Mercadian Masques Block Constructed (Mercadian Masques, Nemesis, Prophecy), Standard
Team Format: Standard
Head Judge: Cyril Grillon

=== Top 8 ===
Quarter-finals
1	Dominik Hothow	3
8	Nicolas Labarre	1
5	Helmut Summersberger	2
4	Bob Maher, Jr.	3
3	Tom van de Logt	2
6	Benedikt Klauser	3
7	Janosch Kühn	1
2	Jon Finkel	3

Semi-finals
Dominik Hothow	0
Bob Maher, Jr.	3
Benedikt Klauser	1
Jon Finkel	3

Finals
Bob Maher, Jr.	2
Jon Finkel	3

=== Final standings ===
Place	Player	Prize	Pro Points	Comment
1	(United States) Jon Finkel	$34,000	32	7th Final day, 2nd Pro Tour win
2	(United States) Bob Maher, Jr.	$22,000	24	2nd Final day
3	(Germany) Dominik Hothow	$16,000	16	
4	(Austria) Benedikt Klauser	$13,000	16	2nd Final day
5	(Netherlands) Tom van de Logt	$11,000	12	
6	(Austria) Helmut Summersberger	$9,500	12	
7	(Germany) Janosch Kühn	$8,250	12	2nd Final day
8	(France) Nicolas Labarre	$7,250	12	3rd Final day

=== National team competition ===
1. United States (Jon Finkel, Chris Benafel, Frank Hernandez, Aaron Forsythe)
2. Canada (Ryan Fuller, Murray Evans, Gabriel Tsang, Sam Lau)

== Pro Player of the year final standings ==
After the World Championship Bob Maher, Jr. was awarded the Pro Player of the year title.

Rank	Player	Pro Points
1	(United States) Bob Maher, Jr.	72
2	(United States) Darwin Kastle	69
3	(United States) Jon Finkel	68
4	(United States) Alex Shvartsman	58
5	(United States) Trevor Blackwell	50
5	(United States) Ben Rubin	50
