= Kai Budde =

German Magic: The Gathering player (1979–2026)

- Nickname: The German Juggernaut
- Born: 28 October 1979; Cologne, North Rhine-Westphalia, West Germany
- Died: 19 January 2026 (aged 46)
- Nationality: German
- Pro Tour debut: 1997 Pro Tour New York (junior); 1997 Pro Tour Mainz (senior)
- Winnings: $426,720
- Pro Tour wins (Top 8): 7 (10)
- Grand Prix wins (Top 8): 7 (15)
- Median Pro Tour Finish: 44
- Lifetime Pro Points: 565
- Planeswalker Level: 49 (Archmage)

Kai Budde (28 October 1979 – 19 January 2026) was a German Magic: The Gathering player who holds the record for Pro Tour victories, and for many years held the records for earnings and lifetime Pro Points. His performances earned him the nicknames "The (German) Juggernaut" and "King of the Grand Prix". Budde left the game in late 2004 to focus on his studies, and his appearances in tournaments became less frequent than in earlier years. He is widely considered to be one of the all-time greatest Magic: The Gathering players.

Budde won five individual Pro Tour titles (no other player has won more than three), including the 1999 Magic World Championship, as well as two Team Pro Tour titles (alongside fellow Germans Marco Blume and Dirk Baberowski). His cash winnings in six years of premier Magic: The Gathering tournaments are well over $300,000. He was also awarded a record four Player of the Year titles: 1999, 2001, 2002, and 2003. On 29 June 2024, the Magic the Gathering Player of the Year-trophy was renamed in his honor.

Budde also won the 2001 Magic Invitational tournament in Cape Town. His prize was the rare opportunity to design an actual card; the result was Voidmage Prodigy. In 2007, he was inducted into the Pro-Tour Hall of Fame. He died in January 2026.

== Career ==
=== Early years ===
Budde started playing Magic in 1994 when he learned about the game from fellow gamers. As a player from Cologne he quickly became acquainted with more experienced players from the city such as later Pro Tour winner Frank Adler. His rise to professional play coincided with that of Dirk Baberowski, another Magic player who had moved to Cologne. Being at a comparable level of playing, both worked together to qualify for the Pro Tour. Budde succeeded on his second attempt, thus qualifying for the 1997 Pro Tour New York. As he had not yet turned eighteen he chose to attend the Junior Division of the tournament, eventually finishing among the best 32. Afterwards, the Junior Pro Tour was discontinued and Budde was automatically qualified for the following Pro Tour in Mainz.

Budde finished 52nd in Mainz and for a while struggled to qualify for another Pro Tour but eventually managed to qualify for the 1998 Pro Tour Chicago. Fellow player and now friend Baberowski had finally managed to qualify for the Pro Tour, too. While Budde finished 19th Baberowski won the whole tournament. After a second place at Grand Prix Birmingham Budde added three Grand Prix titles within six months. The third one in Amsterdam even came by defeating Baberowski in the finals. With these finishes Budde had racked up enough Pro Points to be in contention for the Pro Player of the Year title in the final event of the 1998–99 season. Having not made a Pro Tour Top 8 appearance yet the leader in the Pro Player of the Year race did not consider him to be a threat, though. When Budde advanced to the final of the 1999 World Championship in Tokyo he had already secured the Pro Player of the year race. He added the World Champion title by defeating Mark Le Pine in one of the quickest Pro Tour finals ever.

After adding an 11th-place finish at the next Pro Tour in London the rest of the 1999–2000 season turned out to be disappointing. He was not able to make it beyond the first round in any of the newly introduced Masters events nor did he finish better than Top 64 at any of the succeeding Pro Tours.

=== Five Pro Tour titles in two years ===
In November 2000, Budde made another final eight appearance. A third place at Grand Prix Florence was followed by his second Pro Tour win. The 2000 Pro Tour Chicago title made him the third player to win more than one Pro Tour, the other two being Jon Finkel and Tommi Hovi. Winning Pro Tour Barcelona in the same season, Budde managed to surpass Finkel and Hovi to become the first player to win three Pro Tours. In the semi-final at Barcelona Budde had even asked if he could concede to his friend Patrick Mello to make him eligible for the next Masters, but the officials had refused. Finally a 44th-place finish at the World Championship in Toronto sufficed to make Budde the first double Pro Player of the Year.

The 2001–02 season started very well for Budde with consecutive wins at Grand Prix London and Pro Tour New York. For the Team Pro Tour New York Budde had chosen his friends Dirk Baberowski and Marco Blume, despite being able to play with virtually anybody he would have liked. Dirk had retired from the game for some time, but Budde managed to convince him to come along for the Pro Tour. Team "Phoenix Foundation" as they called themselves went on to become the most successful team in the Pro Tour history. Pro Tour New York is also the origin of the saying "Kai doesn't lose on Sunday". Several Pro Players had answered something to that extent when asked who their favorite amongst the final four teams was. Less than two months later Budde added another Pro Tour title, this time in New Orleans. He is still the only player in the game to have won back-to-back Pro Tours. In between, Budde had also won the Invitational which gave him the chance to create a Magic card of his own design. The card eventually became Voidmage Prodigy.

Throughout the season a few more Grand Prix titles followed and eventually he managed another Top 8 appearance at Pro Tour Nice, this time losing in the quarter-final to Bram Snepvangers. Before the final event of the season, the World Championship in Sydney, Budde was already locked in to succeed himself as Pro Tour Player of the Year. Only a week after Nice, Budde won the German Nationals, securing another title he had not won before and thus making the national team. While he finished 44th individually at the World Championship, Budde led the German team with Felix Schneiders, a fellow player from his Cologne days, and Mark Ziegner to the team title.

Phoenix Foundation won the first Pro Tour of the 2002–03 season, giving Budde an early lead in the Pro Player of the Year race. Also this set the three Phoenix Foundation members in the top three spots in lifetime Pro Tour wins until Jon Finkel overtook Blume with his victory in Kuala Lumpur five years later. After a few mediocre finishes through mid-season Budde won his seventh Pro Tour in Chicago, beating some of the most accomplished players such as Jon Finkel, William Jensen, and Nicolai Herzog along the way. Despite making no further Top 8 appearances in the season Budde was able to take his fourth Pro Player of the Year title with a comfortable lead.

=== Later Magic career and Player of the Year trophy ===
In 2003–04 Phoenix Foundation managed to open with another top 4 appearance, but lost in the semi-final to the eventual winners. Budde managed to make a few more Top 8 appearance at Grand Prixs, among those a victory at the then biggest Magic tournament ever at Madrid, but he found less success after 2004. He managed an undefeated first day at Pro Tour Philadelphia in the following season, but was quickly eliminated from the event afterwards. Budde was then considered to be retired from Pro Play although he showed up for a Pro Tour from time to time. Eventually he was inducted into the Hall of Fame at the 2007 World Championship in New York City. Over the next years he played on the Pro Tour occasionally, but without much success.

In 2010 Budde made his tenth Pro Tour top 8 in Amsterdam, and in 2011 he made his fifteenth Grand Prix top 8 in Paris. Starting with Pro Tour Return to Ravnica Budde was a part of the team currently called 'The Pantheon', alongside players such as Jon Finkel, William Jensen, and Gabriel Nassif. In 2019, he made the Top 4 of the Mythic Championship III, a rebranded version of the Pro Tour, which was entirely played on Magic: The Gathering Arena. In 2023, Budde made another Top 8 at Pro Tour The Lord of the Rings in Barcelona.

== Personal life and death ==
Budde was born on 28 October 1979.

On 29 June 2024, it was announced that Budde had been diagnosed with cancer years prior and that things had taken a turn for the worse. Days later, Wizards of the Coast renamed the Pro Tour player of the year trophy in Budde's honor.

On 29 January 2026, during Pro Tour: Lorwyn Eclipsed, it was announced that Budde had died of cancer. He was 46.

== Top 8 appearances ==
Season	Event type	Location	Format	Date	Rank
1998–99	Grand Prix	Birmingham	Block Constructed	17–18 October 1998	2
1998–99	Grand Prix	Barcelona	Limited	6–7 February 1999	1
1998–99	Grand Prix	Vienna	Extended	13–14 March 1999	1
1998–99	Grand Prix	Amsterdam	Limited	15–16 May 1999	1
1998–99	Worlds	Tokyo	Standard	4–8 August 1999	1
1999–00	Invitational	Kuala Lumpur	Special	2–5 March 2000	6
2000–01	Grand Prix	Florence	Extended	25–26 November 2000	3
2000–01	Pro Tour	Chicago	Standard	1–3 December 2000	1
2000–01	Pro Tour	Barcelona	Limited	4–6 May 2001	1
2001–02	Grand Prix	London	Block Constructed	1–2 September 2001	1
2001–02	Pro Tour	New York	Team Limited	7–9 September 2001	1
2001–02	Invitational	Cape Town	Special	5–7 October 2001	1
2001–02	Pro Tour	New Orleans	Extended	9–11 November 2001	1
2001–02	Grand Prix	Biarritz	Limited	24–25 November 2001	2
2001–02	Grand Prix	Lisbon	Extended	19–20 January 2002	1
2001–02	Grand Prix	Antwerp	Limited	2–3 March 2002	1
2001–02	Masters	Osaka	Team Limited	14–17 March 2002	1
2001–02	Grand Prix	Naples	Limited	6–7 April 2002	3
2001–02	Pro Tour	Nice	Limited	3–5 May 2002	5
2001–02	Nationals	Germany	Special	10–12 May 2002	1
2001–02	Worlds	Sydney	National team	10–14 August 2002	1
2002–03	Pro Tour	Boston	Team Limited	27–29 September 2002	1
2002–03	Grand Prix	Copenhagen	Limited	12–13 October 2002	3
2002–03	Masters	Chicago	Standard	16–19 January 2003	8
2002–03	Pro Tour	Chicago	Limited	17–19 January 2003	1
2003–04	Pro Tour	Boston	Team Limited	12–14 September 2003	4
2003–04	Grand Prix	Gothenburg	Limited	22–23 November 2003	4
2003–04	Grand Prix	Madrid	Limited	21–22 February 2004	1
2003–04	Grand Prix	Brussels	Block Constructed	29–30 May 2004	2
2005	Invitational	Los Angeles	Special	17–20 May 2005	7
2010	Pro Tour	Amsterdam	Extended and Booster Draft	3–5 September 2010	8
2011	Grand Prix	Paris	Limited	12–13 February 2011	5
2023	Pro Tour	Barcelona	Modern	28–30 July 2023	8
2024	Worlds	Las Vegas	Standard and Booster Draft	25–27 October 2024	8

Last updated: 27 October 2024
Source: Wizards.com

=== Other accomplishments ===
- Pro Player of the Year 1998–1999
- Pro Player of the Year 2000–2001
- Pro Player of the Year 2001–2002
- Pro Player of the Year 2002–2003
- Magic Hall of Fame class of 2007 vote leader

Preceded by (United States) Jon Finkel	Pro Player of the Year; 1998–99	Succeeded by (United States) Bob Maher, Jr.
Preceded by (United States) Bob Maher, Jr.	Pro Player of the Year; 2000–01, 2001–02, 2002–03	Succeeded by (France) Gabriel Nassif
Preceded by (United States) Brian Selden	Magic World Champion; 1999	Succeeded by (United States) Jon Finkel
Preceded by (United States) Jon Finkel	Magic Invitational Champion; 2001	Succeeded by (Sweden) Jens Thorén
Preceded by Daniel Zink	Magic German National Champion; 2002	Succeeded by Dirk Baberowski
Preceded by (United States) United States; Eugene Harvey; Trevor Blackwell; Brian Hegstad	Magic: The Gathering Team World Champion; With: Mark Ziegner; Felix Schneiders; 2002	Succeeded by (United States) United States; Justin Gary; Gabe Walls; Joshua Wagner
