= Magic: The Gathering Pro Tour season 2001–02 =

2001–02 Pro Tour season
- Pro Player of the Year: (Germany) Kai Budde
- Rookie of the Year: (France) Farid Meraghni
- World Champion: (Brazil) Carlos Romão
- Pro Tours: 6
- Grands Prix: 33
- Masters: 4
- Start of season: 18 August 2001
- End of season: 18 August 2002

The 2001–02 Pro Tour season was the seventh season of the Magic: The Gathering Pro Tour. On 18 August 2001 the season began with parallel Grand Prixs in Kobe and Denver. It ended on 18 August 2002 with the conclusion of the 2002 World Championship in Sydney. The season consisted of 33 Grand Prixs and 6 Pro Tours, held in New York, New Orleans, San Diego, Osaka, Nice, and Sydney. Also Master Series tournaments were held at four Pro Tours. At the end of the season Kai Budde was proclaimed Pro Player of the Year, winning the title by a record margin.

== Grand Prixs – Kobe, Denver, Santiago, Singapore, London ==
GP Kobe (18–19 August)

1. (Japan) Itaru Ishida
2. (Japan) Shuhei Nakamura
3. (Japan) Kei Ikeda
4. (Japan) Takayuki Nagaoka
5. (Japan) Hiroshi Kawasaki
6. (Japan) Ryo Ogura
7. (Japan) Takumi Hasegawa
8. (Japan) Kenshiro Ito

GP Denver (18–19 August)

1. (United States) Brett Shears
2. (United States) Danny Mandel
3. (United States) Brock Parker
4. (United States) Darwin Kastle
5. (United States) Sammy Batarseh
6. (United States) Mike Abraham
7. (United States) Aaron Knobloch
8. (United States) Alex Borteh

GP Santiago (25–26 August)

1. (Argentina) Matias Gabrenja
2. (Mexico) Gerardo Godinez
3. (Chile) Jorge Rodriguez
4. (Chile) Jose Echeverria
5. (Chile) Rodrigo Sanchez
6. (United States) Brock Parker
7. (Chile) Andrés Hojman
8. (Chile) Juan Ruetter

GP Singapore (1–2 September)

1. (Singapore) Albertus Law
2. (Singapore) Kelvin Yew Teck Hoon
3. (Singapore) Akuma Ding Yuen Leong
4. (Japan) Michihisa Onoda
5. (Singapore) Royce Ming Huang Chai
6. (Singapore) Lance Chin Wei Yeong
7. (Singapore) David Kwan
8. (Singapore) Chang Chua

GP London (1–2 September)

1. (Germany) Kai Budde
2. (France) Gabriel Nassif
3. (Austria) Helmut Summersberger
4. (Netherlands) Matt Henstra
5. (England) Warren Marsh
6. (Germany) René Kraft
7. (France) Antoine Ruel
8. (France) Pierre Malherbaud

== Pro Tour – New York (7–9 September 2001) ==
New York was the third time Pro Tour was held in the Team Limited format. Car Acrobatic Team who had been amongst the Top 4 at the previous team Pro Tour returned for another Top 4. The event was won by team Phoenix Foundation consisting of Kai Budde, Dirk Baberowski, and Marco Blume. It was Baberowski's second win and Budde's fourth. The final was also a repeat to the final of Grand Prix London a week before, where Budde had already won against Nassif. Eventually Kai's renewed success led to some memorable quotes. Asked about the favorite to win amongst the final 4 several pros exclaimed something to the extent of the words Gary Wise pronounced, "Kai doesn't lose on Sunday". Randy Buehler's comment "if he wins New Orleans, I guess he is" on the discussion whether Kai is the best player in the history of the game also became a classic when Kai indeed won PT New Orleans.

=== Tournament data ===
Prize pool: $202,200
Players: 426 (142 teams)
Format: Invasion Team Sealed (Invasion, Planeshift, Apocalypse) – first day, Invasion Team Rochester Draft (Invasion-Planeshift-Apocalypse) – final two days
Head Judge: Collin Jackson

=== Top 4 ===
Semi-finals
1	Illuminati	1
4	Les Plus Class	2
2	Phoenix Foundation	2
3	Car Acrobatic Team	1

Finals
Les Plus Class	1
Phoenix Foundation	2

=== Final standings ===
Place	Team	Player	Prize	Pro Points	Comment
1	Phoenix Foundation	(Germany) Marco Blume	$60,000	24	
1	Phoenix Foundation	(Germany) Dirk Baberowski	$60,000	24	3rd Final day, 2nd Pro Tour win
1	Phoenix Foundation	(Germany) Kai Budde	$60,000	24	4th Final day, 4th Pro Tour win
2	Les Plus Class	(France) Amiel Tenenbaum	$30,000	18	Pro Tour debut
2	Les Plus Class	(France) Gabriel Nassif	$30,000	18	
2	Les Plus Class	(France) Nicolas Olivieri	$30,000	18	
3	Illuminati^{*}	(United States) Justin Gary	$18,000	12	2nd Final day
3	Illuminati^{*}	(United States) Zvi Mowshowitz	$18,000	12	4th Final day
3	Illuminati^{*}	(United States) Alex Shvartsman	$18,000	12	
4	Car Acrobatic Team	(United States) Aaron Forsythe	$15,000	12	2nd Final day
4	Car Acrobatic Team	(United States) Andrew Cuneo	$15,000	12	2nd Final day
4	Car Acrobatic Team	(United States) Andrew Johnson	$15,000	12	2nd Final day

^{*} The team entered the tournament as "My Team Part 17", but decided they wanted to have more serious name as a Top4 team and changed it to "Illuminati".

=== Pro Player of the year standings ===
Rank	Player	Pro Points
1	(Germany) Kai Budde	30
2	(Germany) Dirk Baberowski	24
2	(Germany) Marco Blume	24
4	(France) Gabriel Nassif	23
5	(France) Nicholas Olivieri	18
5	(France) Amiel Tenenbaum	18

== Grand Prixs – Warsaw, Minneapolis, Oslo, Vienna, Cape Town, Shizuoka, Montreal, Brisbane ==
GP Warsaw (8–9 September)

1. (Sweden) Rickard Österberg
2. (Czech Republic) Michal Marcik
3. (Sweden) David Linder
4. (Sweden) Mattias Kettil
5. (Poland) Przemek Oberbek
6. (Poland) Marcin Sados
7. (Germany) Felix Schneiders
8. (Poland) Roman Kubera

GP Oslo (22–23 September)

1. (United States) Trey Van Cleave
2. (Sweden) Anton Jonsson
3. (Sweden) Johan Backfjärd
4. (Norway) Sigurd Eskeland
5. (Sweden) Svante Landgraf
6. (Sweden) Rickard Österberg
7. (Denmark) Peter Laier
8. (Norway) Haakon Monsen

GP Minneapolis (29–30 September)

1. (United States) Dave Humpherys
2. (United States) Andrew Wolf
3. (United States) Brian Hegstad
4. (United States) Brian Davis
5. (United States) Craig Wescoe
6. (United States) Cassius Weatherby
7. (United States) Lee Curtis
8. (United States) Jacob Janoska

GP Vienna (6–7 October)

1. (Germany) Stephan Meyer
2. (Norway) Eivind Nitter
3. (Norway) Nicolai Herzog
4. (Hungary) Gabor Papp
5. (Switzerland) Matthias Künzler
6. (Germany) Holger Meinecke
7. (Poland) Konrad Zawadzki
8. (Croatia) Ladoslav Zupancic

GP Cape Town (6–7 October)

1. (Australia) Ben Seck
2. (South Africa) Wagner Kruger
3. (United States) Justin Polin
4. (South Africa) Grant van Dyk
5. (South Africa) Andrew Mitchell
6. (South Africa) Pieter Loubser
7. (South Africa) Robert Thompson
8. (South Africa) Peter Klein

GP Shizuoka (13–14 October)

1. (Japan) Kohei Yamadaya
2. (Japan) Masahiko Morita
3. (Japan) Ryouma Shiozu
4. (France) Olivier Ruel
5. (Japan) Katsuhiro Mori
6. (Japan) Tsuyoshi Douyama
7. (Japan) Reiji Ando
8. (Japan) Eiho Kato

GP Montreal (13–14 October)

1. (United States) Mike Turian
2. (Canada) Louis Boileau
3. (United States) Timothy McKenna
4. (United States) Brett Shears
5. (Canada) David Rood
6. (United States) Bob Maher, Jr.
7. (United States) Peter Szigeti
8. (United States) Daniel Clegg

GP Brisbane (20–21 October)

1. (Australia) Richard Johnston
2. (New Zealand) Roger Miller
3. (United States) Alex Shvartsman
4. (Australia) Egidio De Gois
5. (Australia) Lenny Collins
6. (Australia) Dante Rosati
7. (Australia) Pang Ming Wee
8. (Australia) Daniel Romans

== Pro Tour – New Orleans (2–4 November 2001) ==
After winning Pro Tour New York Kai Budde won New Orleans as well, making him the only player to win back to back Pro Tours. His fifth Pro Tour victory also made him the record money-earner and erased almost all doubt, that Budde is the best player in the history of the game.

=== Tournament data ===
Prize pool: $200,130
Players: 355
Format: Extended
Head Judge: Mike Guptil

=== Top 8 ===
Quarter-finals
1	Tomi Walamies	3
8	Benedikt Klauser	2
4	Raphael Gennari	1
5	Jelger Wiegersma	3
2	Anton Jonsson	2
7	Dave Humpherys	3
3	Kai Budde	3
6	Darwin Kastle	0

Semi-finals
Tomi Walamies	3
Jelger Wiegersma	0
Dave Humpherys	0
Kai Budde	3

Finals
Tomi Walamies	2
Kai Budde	3

=== Final standings ===
Place	Player	Prize	Pro Points	Comment
1	(Germany) Kai Budde	$30,000	32	5th Final day, 5th Pro Tour win
2	(Finland) Tomi Walamies	$20,000	24	
3	(Netherlands) Jelger Wiegersma	$15,000	16	
4	(United States) Dave Humpherys	$13,000	16	3rd Final day
5	(Sweden) Anton Jonsson	$9,500	12	
6	(Switzerland) Raphaël Gennary	$8,500	12	1st Swiss Player in a Top 8
7	(United States) Darwin Kastle	$7,500	12	6th Final day
8	(Austria) Benedikt Klauser	$6,500	12	4th Final day

=== Masters – Booster Draft ===
1st Round
1	Ben Rubin
32	Gabriel Tsang	2
16	Justin Gary
17	Johan Sadeghpour	2
8	Dan Clegg
25	Noah Boeken	2
9	Brock Parker
24	Alex Shvartsman	2
4	Zvi Mowshowitz	2
29	Alan Comer
13	Rob Dougherty
20	Brian Hegstad	2
5	Michael Pustilnik	2
28	Matt Vienneau
12	Antoine Ruel	2
21	Itaru Ishida
2	Kai Budde	2
31	Sol Malka
15	Tom Van de Logt
18	Bob Maher, Jr.	2
7	Ryan Fuller	2
26	Scott Johns
10	Jon Finkel	2
23	Neil Reeves
3	Kamiel Cornelissen	2
30	Franck Canu
14	Benedikt Klauser
19	Nicholas Olivieri	2
6	Chris Benafel	2
27	Bram Snepvangers
11	Tsuyoshi Fujita
22	Michael Gurney	2

2nd Round
Gabriel Tsang
Johan Sadeghpour	2
Noah Boeken	2
Alex Shvartsman
Zvi Mowshowitz	2
Brian Hegstad
Michael Pustilnik	2
Antoine Ruel
Kai Budde
Bob Maher, Jr.	2
Ryan Fuller	2
Jon Finkel
Kamiel Cornelissen
Nicholas Olivieri	2
Chris Benafel	2
Michael Gurney

Quarter-finals
Johan Sadeghpour
Noah Boeken	2
Zvi Mowshowitz
Michael Pustilnik	2
Bob Maher, Jr.	2
Ryan Fuller
Nicholas Olivieri
Chris Benafel	2

Semi-finals
Noah Boeken
Michael Pustilnik	2
Bob Maher, Jr.
Chris Benafel	2

Finals
Michael Pustilnik	2
Chris Benafel

=== Pro Player of the year standings ===
Rank	Player	Pro Points
1	(Germany) Kai Budde	62
2	(Finland) Tomi Walamies	35
3	(Germany) Marco Blume	32
4	(France) Gabriel Nassif	28
5	(United States) Dave Humpherys	26

== Grand Prixs – Hong Kong, Atlanta, Biarritz, Curitiba, Las Vegas, Sendai, Houston ==
GP Hong Kong (17–18 November)

1. (United States) Jeff Fung
2. (Philippines) Frederick Salazar
3. (Japan) Tsuyoshi Fujita
4. (Japan) Shinsuke Hayashi
5. (Philippines) Bayani Manansala, Jr.
6. (United States) Steven Shears
7. (United States) Brian Hegstad
8. (Canada) Ryan Fuller

GP Atlanta (17–18 November)

1. (United States) Eugene Harvey
2. (United States) Andrew Johnson
3. (United States) Brad Swan
4. (United States) Matt Linde
5. (United States) Bin Chen
6. (United States) Antonino De Rosa
7. (United States) Craig Wescoe
8. (United States) Alex Borteh

GP Biarritz (24–25 November)

1. (France) Nicolas Labarre
2. (Germany) Kai Budde
3. (Spain) Lucio Moratinos
4. (Netherlands) Joost Vollebregt
5. (Spain) Ferran Vila
6. (Netherlands) Alexander Witt
7. (France) Alexis Dumay
8. (France) Olivier Ruel

GP Curitiba (8–9 December)

1. (Brazil) Guilherme Svaldi
2. (United States) Alex Shvartsman
3. (France) Antoine Ruel
4. (Brazil) Leopoldo Martins
5. (Brazil) Raphael Gunther
6. (Argentina) Jose Barbero
7. (Brazil) José Mangueira
8. (Brazil) Eliton Enacio

GP Las Vegas (8–9 December)

1. (United States) Michael Pustilnik
2. (United States) Adam Lane
3. (United States) John Balla
4. (United States) Sean Fitzgerald
5. (United States) Kaare Anderson
6. (United States) Rob Dougherty
7. (United States) Shannon Krumick
8. (United States) Scott Gerhardt

GP Sendai (15–16 December)

1. (Japan) Kazuaki Arahori
2. (Japan) Kazuya Hirabayashi
3. (United States) Mike Long
4. (Japan) Yuki Murakami
5. (Japan) Itaru Ishida
6. (Japan) Kazufumi Abe
7. (Japan) Jin Okamoto
8. (Japan) Katsuhiro Mori

GP Houston (5–6 January)

1. (United States) Joshua Smith
2. (United States) Brian Kibler
3. (United States) William Jensen
4. (United States) Ben Rubin
5. (United States) Bob Maher, Jr.
6. (United States) Alex Shvartsman
7. (United States) Jonathan Pechon
8. (United States) Jonathan Job

== Pro Tour – San Diego (11–13 January 2002) ==
The 2002 was won by the French Farid Meraghni. It was the first time a French player won a major tournament after several French players coming in second at Worlds and Pro Tours. Also the tournament is known for Magic veteran Eric Taylor literally eating his hat due to losing a bet about Kai Budde winning Pro Tour New Orleans. Canadian player Ryan Fuller won the Masters.

=== Tournament data ===
Players: 348
Prize Pool: $200,130
Format: Odyssey Rochester Draft (Odyssey)
Head Judge: Mike Donais

=== Top 8 ===
Quarter-finals
1	Jeff Cunningham	0
8	Andrew Wolf	3
4	Eric Froehlich	2
5	Jens Thorén	3
2	Neil Reeves	1
7	Farid Meraghni	3
3	Frederico Bastos	2
6	Donnie Gallitz	3

Semi-finals
Andrew Wolf	0
Jens Thorén	3
Farid Meragni	3
Donnie Gallitz	0

Finals
Jens Thorén	2
Farid Meraghni	3

=== Final standings ===
Place	Player	Prize	Pro Points	Comment
1	(France) Farid Meraghni	$30,000	32	1st Frenchmen to win a Pro Tour
2	(Sweden) Jens Thorén	$20,000	24	
3	(United States) Donnie Gallitz	$15,000	16	
4	(United States) Andrew Wolf	$13,000	16	2nd Final day
5	(Canada) Jeff Cunningham	$9,000	12	
6	(Portugal) Frederico Bastos	$8,500	12	2nd Final day
7	(United States) Neil Reeves	$8,000	12	
8	(United States) Eric Froehlich	$7,500	12	

=== Masters – Standard ===
1st Round
1	Ben Rubin
32	Rob Dougherty	2
16	Joost Vollebregt
17	Alan Comer	2
8	Dan Clegg
25	Olivier Ruel	2
9	Jon Finkel
24	Tomi Walamies	2
4	Kamiel Cornelissen	2
29	Tom Guevin
13	Anton Jonsson
20	Dave Humpherys	2
5	Tsuyoshi Fujita	2
28	David Jafari
12	Jelger Wiegersma	2
21	Chris Benafel
2	Zvi Mowshowitz
31	Darwin Kastle	2
15	Markus Bell
18	Benedikt Klauser	2
7	Brock Parker	2
26	Alex Shvartsman
10	Brian Hegstad	2
23	Michael Pustilnik
3	Ryan Fuller	2
30	Roger Sorino
14	Franck Canu	2
19	Antoine Ruel
6	Tom Van de Logt
27	Steven O'Mahoney-Schwartz	2
11	Patrick Mello	2
22	Kai Budde

2nd Round
Rob Dougherty	2
Alan Comer
Olivier Ruel
Tomi Walamies	2
Kamiel Cornelissen
Dave Humpherys	2
Tsuyoshi Fujita	2
Jelger Wiegersma
Darwin Kastle	2
Benedikt Klauser
Brock Parker
Brian Hegstad	2
Ryan Fuller	2
Franck Canu
Steven O'Mahoney-Schwartz	2
Patrick Mello

Quarter-finals
Rob Dougherty	1
Tomi Walamies	2
Dave Humpherys	2
Tsuyoshi Fujita	0
Darwin Kastle	1
Brian Hegstad	2
Ryan Fuller	2
Steve O'Mahoney-Schwartz	0

Semi-finals
Tomi Walamies	1
Dave Humpherys	2
Brian Hegstad	1
Ryan Fuller	2

Finals
Dave Humpherys	0
Ryan Fuller	2

=== Pro Player of the year standings ===
Rank	Player	Pro Points
1	(Germany) Kai Budde	80
2	(Sweden) Jens Thorén	40
3	(France) Farid Meraghni	38
4	(Finland) Tomi Walamies	34
5	(Germany) Marco Blume	33

== Grand Prixs – Lisbon, Heidelberg, Fukuoka, Tampa, Antwerp ==
GP Lisbon (19–20 January)

1. (Germany) Kai Budde
2. (Germany) Patrick Mello
3. (France) Olivier Ruel
4. (Portugal) Marcio Carvalho
5. (Italy) Stefano Fiore
6. (United States) Alex Shvartsman
7. (Netherlands) Tom Van de Logt
8. (Netherlands) Jelger Wiegersma

GP Heidelberg (9–10 February)

1. (Netherlands) Kamiel Cornelissen
2. (United States) Chris Benafel
3. (France) Franck Canu
4. (Austria) Thomas Preyer
5. (Netherlands) Jelger Wiegersma
6. (Germany) Patrick Mello
7. (Ukraine) Yuri Kolomeyko
8. (Netherlands) Joost Vollebregt

GP Fukuoka (16–17 February)

1. (United States) Alex Shvartsman
2. (Japan) Masahiko Morita
3. (Japan) Itaru Ishida
4. (Japan) Jun Ishihara
5. (Japan) Masahiro Kuroda
6. (Japan) Tsuyoshi Fujita
7. (Japan) Yusuke Sasaki
8. (Japan) Shuhei Nakamura

GP Tampa (23–24 February)

1. (United States) Sol Malka
2. (Canada) Jeff Cunningham
3. (United States) Koby Kennison
4. (United States) Mike Emmert
5. (United States) Antonino De Rosa
6. (United States) Brian Kibler
7. (United States) Adam Racht
8. (United States) Adam Prokopin

GP Antwerp (2–3 March)

1. (Germany) Kai Budde
2. (France) Florent Jeudon
3. (Sweden) Matthias Jorstedt
4. (Germany) Wolfgang Eder
5. (Netherlands) Arjan van Leeuwen
6. (Germany) Christoph Lippert
7. (Netherlands) Jos Schreurs
8. (Germany) Dirk Baberowski

== Pro Tour – Osaka (15–17 March 2002) ==
=== Tournament data ===
Players: 277
Prize Pool: $200,130
Format: Odyssey Block Constructed (Odyssey, Torment)
Head Judge: Collin Jackson

=== Top 8 ===
Quarter-finals
1	Rob Dougherty	3
8	Christophe Haim	1
4	Nicholas Olivieri	2
5	Olivier Ruel	3
2	Sylvain Lauriol	2
7	Ken Ho	3
3	Jens Thorén	3
6	Osyp Lebedowicz	2

Semi-finals
Rob Dougherty	0
Olivier Ruel	3
Ken Ho	3
Jens Thorén	1

Finals
Olivier Ruel	2
Ken Ho	3

=== Final standings ===
Place	Player	Prize	Pro Points	Comment
1	(United States) Ken Ho	$30,000	32	
2	(France) Olivier Ruel	$20,000	24	
3	(United States) Rob Dougherty	$15,000	16	4th Final day
4	(Sweden) Jens Thorén	$13,000	16	2nd Final day
5	(France) Sylvain Lauriol	$9,000	12	
6	(France) Nicholas Olivieri	$8,500	12	2nd Final day
7	(United States) Osyp Lebedowicz	$8,000	12	
8	(France) Christophe Haim	$7,500	12	

=== Masters – Team Rochester Draft ===
Quarter-finals
1	Phoenix Foundation	2
8	Outland
4	Les Plus Class	2
5	Slay-Pillage-Massacre
2	Your Move Games	?
7	Panzer Hunter	2
3	www.star-maker.nl/lap	2
6	Metagames	?

Semi-finals
Phoenix Foundation	2
Les Plus Class
Panzer Hunter	2
www.star-maker.nl/lap

Finals
Phoenix Foundation	2
Panzer Hunter	1

Team	Player	Team	Player
Les Plus Class	(France) Amiel Tenenbaum	Phoenix Foundation	(Germany) Dirk Baberowski
Les Plus Class	(France) Gabriel Nassif	Phoenix Foundation	(Germany) Kai Budde
Les Plus Class	(France) Nicolas Olivieri	Phoenix Foundation	(Germany) Marco Blume
Metagames	(France) Wilfried Ranque	Slay-Pillage-Massacre	(United States) Scott McCord
Metagames	(France) Raphaël Lévy	Slay-Pillage-Massacre	(United States) Jon Sonne
Metagames	(France) Franck Canu	Slay-Pillage-Massacre	(United States) Eric Ziegler
Outland	(Norway) Bjørn Jocumsen	www.star-maker.nl/lap	(Netherlands) Victor Van der Broek
Outland	(Norway) Eivind Nitter	www.star-maker.nl/lap	(Netherlands) Frank Karsten
Outland	(Norway) Nicolai Herzog	www.star-maker.nl/lap	(Netherlands) Jelger Wiegersma
Panzer Hunter	(Japan) Itaru Ishida	Your Move Games	(United States) Dave Humpherys
Panzer Hunter	(Japan) Kazuyaki Momose	Your Move Games	(United States) Rob Dougherty
Panzer Hunter	(Japan) Reiji Andou	Your Move Games	(United States) Darwin Kastle

=== Pro Player of the year standings ===
Rank	Player	Pro Points
1	(Germany) Kai Budde	90
2	(Sweden) Jens Thorén	58
3	(United States) Alex Shvartsman	48
4	(France) Olivier Ruel	45
5	(France) Gabriel Nassif	42

== Grand Prixs – Barcelona, Kuala Lumpur, Naples ==
GP Barcelona (23–24 March)

1. (Netherlands) Noah Boeken
2. (Germany) Christoph Lippert
3. (France) Olivier Ruel
4. (Spain) Carlos Barrado
5. (Netherlands) Stan van der Velden
6. (Germany) Reinhard Blech
7. (France) Raphaël Lévy
8. (France) Franck Canu

GP Kuala Lumpur (30–31 March)

1. (Singapore) Ding Yueng Leong
2. (Singapore) Chang Chua
3. (Singapore) Yujian Zhou
4. (Thailand) Veerapat Sirilertvorakul
5. (United States) Alex Shvartsman
6. (Singapore) Nicholas Jonatha Wong
7. (Taiwan) Tobey Tamber
8. (Philippines) Edsel Alvarez

GP Naples (6–7 April)

1. (France) Pierre Malherbaud
2. (Netherlands) Jelger Wiegersma
3. (Germany) Kai Budde
4. (France) Olivier Ruel
5. (Germany) Patrick Mello
6. (Germany) Iwan Tan
7. (France) Raphaël Lévy
8. (Germany) Christoph Lippert

== Pro Tour – Nice (3–5 May 2002) ==
In Nice Kai Budde lost his first match on a Pro Tour Sunday, after winning his previous five Top 8. His third final day appearance and ensuing 36-point-lead virtually secured him the Pro Player of the Year title, though. The Pro Tour was won by Norwegian Eivind Nitter, while the Masters Series title went to Alexander Witt from the Netherlands.

=== Tournament data ===
Players: 332
Prize Pool: $200,130
Format: Odyssey Block Booster Draft (Odyssey-Torment)
Head Judge: Cyril Grillon

=== Top 8 ===
Quarter-finals
1	Svend Geertsen	3
8	Benjamin Niedrig	1
4	Gary Talim	1
5	Eivind Nitter	3
2	Anton Jonsson	2
7	Brian Davis	3
3	Kai Budde	0
6	Bram Snepvangers	3

Semi-finals
Svend Geertsen	2
Eivind Nitter	3
Brian Davis	2
Bram Snepvangers	3

Finals
Eivind Nitter	3
Bram Snepvangers	0

=== Final standings ===
Place	Player	Prize	Pro Points	Comment
1	(Norway) Eivind Nitter	$30,000	32	
2	(Netherlands) Bram Snepvangers	$20,000	24	
3	(Denmark) Svend Geertsen	$15,000	16	4th Final day
4	(United States) Brian Davis	$13,000	16	2nd Final day
5	(Germany) Kai Budde	$9,000	12	6th Final day
6	(Sweden) Anton Jonsson	$8,500	12	2nd Final day
7	(United States) Gary Talim	$8,000	12	
8	(Switzerland) Benjamin Niedrig	$7,500	12	

=== Masters – Extended ===
1st Round
1	William Jensen
32	bye
16	Kamiel Cornelissen
17	Tomi Walamies	2
8	Ken Ho	2
25	Franck Canu
9	Rob Dougherty
24	Justin Gary	2
4	Olivier Ruel	2
29	Brock Parker
13	Antoine Ruel	2
20	Ben Rubin
5	Dan Clegg
28	Nicholas Olivieri	2
12	Jelger Wiegersma
21	Jin Okamoto	2
2	Kai Budde	2
31	Geoffrey Siron
15	David Humpherys
18	Gabriel Nassif	2
7	Alex Shvartsman	2
26	Alex Borteh
10	Patrick Mello	2
23	Brian Hegstad
3	Jens Thorén	2
30	Osyb Lebedowicz
14	Chris Benafel	2
19	Gary Wise
6	Tom Van de Logt
27	Gerard Fabiano	2
11	Alan Comer
22	Alexander Witt	2

2nd Round
William Jensen
Tomi Walamies	2
Ken Ho
Justin Gary	2
Olivier Ruel
Antoine Ruel	2
Nicholas Olivieri	2
Jin Okamoto
Kai Budde	2
Gabriel Nassif
Alex Shvartsman
Patrick Mello	2
Jens Thorén	2
Chris Benafel
Gerard Fabiano
Alexander Witt	2

Quarter-final
Tomi Walamies
Justin Gary	2
Antoine Ruel	2
Nicholas Olivieri
Kai Budde	2
Patrick Mello
Jens Thorén
Alexander Witt	2

Semi-finals
Justin Gary	2
Antoine Ruel
Kai Budde
Alexander Witt	2

Finals
Justin Gary
Alexander Witt	2

=== Pro Player of the year standings ===
Rank	Player	Pro Points
1	(Germany) Kai Budde	96
2	(Sweden) Jens Thorén	61
3	(United States) Alex Shvartsman	56
4	(France) Olivier Ruel	55
5	(France) Gabriel Nassif	47

== Grand Prixs – Nagoya, Milwaukee, New Jersey, Sao Paulo, Taipei ==
GP Nagoya (11–12 May)
1. P.S.2

(Japan) Masahiro Kuroda
(Japan) Katsuhiro Mori
(Japan) Masahiko Morita

2. S.S.D.

(Japan) Naoki Kubouchi
(Japan) Shuhei Nakamura
(Japan) Kimio Imai

3. NAGOYAN

(Japan) Ryo Ogura
(Japan) Ryoma Shiozu
(Japan) Koji Nose

4. N.G.O.K.

(Japan) Takayuki Nagaoka
(Japan) Tsuyoshi Fujita
(Japan) Masayuki Higashino

GP Milwaukee (11–12 May)

1. (United States) Eric Taylor
2. (United States) Patrick Chapin
3. (United States) Mike Turian
4. (United States) Neil Reeves
5. (United States) David Petersen
6. (United States) Brian Kibler
7. (United States) William Jensen
8. (United States) Steve Cassell

GP New Jersey (29–30 June)
1. The Jokas

(United States) Eric James
(United States) Kyle Rose
(United States) Norman Woods

2. Illuminati

(United States) Justin Gary
(United States) Zvi Mowshowitz
(United States) Alex Shvartsman

3. Team Cardshark

(United States) Jason Huang
(United States) Paul Sottosanti
(United States) Adam Fischer

4. Lovespell

(United States) Alex Borteh
(United States) Chris Benafel
(United States) Eric Froehlich

GP São Paulo (13–14 July)

1. (Argentina) Gabriel Caligaris
2. (Brazil) Felipe Desiderati
3. (France) Antoine Ruel
4. (Brazil) Luis Sérgio Massaro
5. (Brazil) Raphael Fontana Günter
6. (Brazil) André Barreto
7. (Brazil) Michel Shirozono
8. (Brazil) Rodrigo Castro

GP Taipei (13–14 July)

1. (Taiwan) Sheng Hsun Hsia
2. (Taiwan) Kang Nien Chiang
3. (Taiwan) Joe Yi Xiang Wang
4. (Singapore) Albertus Law
5. (Taiwan) Morris Song
6. (Taiwan) Wen-Jien Hwang
7. (Taiwan) Chang Ming Tung
8. (Taiwan) Lucifar Sun

== 2002 World Championships – Sydney (14–18 August 2002) ==
As Jens Thorén had not scored any points since Nice and he was not on his national team the Pro Tour Player of the Year going to Kai Budde was already a sure thing before the tournament. While Carlos Romão from Brazil became World Champion by defeating Mark Ziegner from Germany in the final, the German team also starring Mark Ziegner won the team competition.

=== Tournament data ===
Prize pool: $210,200 (individual) + $162,000 (national teams)
Players: 245
Formats: Standard, Odyssey Booster Draft (Odyssey-Torment-Judgment), Odyssey Block Constructed (Odyssey, Torment, Judgment)
Head Judge: Collin Jackson

=== Top 8 ===
Quarter-finals
1	Diego Ostrovich	3
8	Ken Krouner	1
4	Tuomas Kotiranta	0
5	Carlos Romão	3
2	Sim Han How	0
7	Mark Ziegner	3
3	John Larkin	1
6	Dave Humpherys	3

Semi-finals
Diego Ostrovich	2
Carlos Romão	3
Mark Ziegner	3
Dave Humpherys	1

Finals
Carlos Romão	3
Mark Ziegner	2

=== Final standings ===
Place	Player	Prize	Pro Points	Comment
1	(Brazil) Carlos Romão	$35,000	32	1st Brazilian to win a Pro Tour
2	(Germany) Mark Ziegner	$23,000	24	
3	(Argentina) Diego Ostrovich	$15,000	16	1st Argentinian in a Top 8
4	(United States) Dave Humpherys	$13,000	16	4th Final day
5	(Malaysia) Sim Han How	$9,000	12	1st Malaysian in a Top 8
6	(Republic of Ireland) John Larkin	$8,500	12	2nd Final day
7	(Finland) Tuomas Kotiranta	$8,000	12	
8	(United States) Ken Krouner	$7,500	12	

=== National team competition ===
1. Germany (Mark Ziegner, Kai Budde, Felix Schneiders)
2. United States (Andrew Ranks, Eugene Harvey, Eric Franz)

== Pro Player of the year final standings ==
After the World Championship Kai Budde was awarded the Pro Player of the year title. He thus became the only player to win the title more than once. Budde's 117 Pro Points in this season to date is still the only time that a player garnered more than 100 Pro Points in a season, and his lead of 42 Pro Points over the second place is still the greatest ever achieved at the end of a season.

Rank	Player	Pro Points
1	(Germany) Kai Budde	117
2	(Sweden) Jens Thorén	75
3	(United States) Alex Shvartsman	62
4	(France) Olivier Ruel	58
5	(United States) Dave Humpherys	52
