= Dirk Baberowski =

German Magic: The Gathering player

- Nationality: German
- Pro Tour debut: 1998 Pro Tour Chicago
- Winnings: US$150,960
- Pro Tour wins (Top 8): 3 (5)
- Grand Prix wins (Top 8): 0 (3)
- Median Pro Tour Finish: 64
- Lifetime Pro Points: 224
- Planeswalker Level: 44 (Battlemage)

Dirk Baberowski is a German Magic: The Gathering player. He is one of the most successful players of the game. He has won three Pro Tours, tying him in second place with Jon Finkel. Two of those victories were won at team Pro Tours with his teammates of Phoenix Foundation, Kai Budde and Marco Blume.

In 2008, Barberowski was voted in the Hall of Fame. He was inducted during the World championship in Memphis.

== Career ==
Dirk Baberowski qualified for Pro Tour (PT) Chicago due to a 12th place at Grand Prix Zurich on 31 May 1998. PT Chicago on 25–27 September 1998 featured Tempest-Stronghold-Exodus Rochester Draft. Despite being his first PT appearance Baberowksi managed to win the tournament, drafting a green-white deck, widely considered a horrible color combination in that format.

Other than a 2nd-place finish behind teammate Kai Budde at Grand Prix Amsterdam, most of the remaining season consisted of mediocre finishes at professional events. Baberowski managed another 2nd place at the European Championships in Berlin at the end of the season, though. A 63rd place at the World championship in Tokyo sufficed to take home the Rookie of the Year award.

The only notable finish in the next two PT seasons was a top 8 finish, again at a Pro Tour in Chicago. After that Dirk banded up with Kai Budde and Marco Blume to form the team Phoenix Foundation. Together they swept back to back team Pro Tours in New York (2001) and Boston (2002), also winning the Osaka team Master in between. The following season Phoenix Foundation managed another final day appearance in Boston (2003). Phoenix Foundation disbanded thereafter with the members quitting professional Magic.

== Accomplishments ==
Season	Event type	Location	Format	Date	Rank
1998–99	Pro Tour	Chicago	Limited	25–27 September 1998	1
1998–99	Grand Prix	Amsterdam	Limited	15–16 May 1999	2
1998–99	European Championship	Berlin	Special	5–7 July 1999	2
1999–00	Pro Tour	Chicago	Extended	3–5 December 1999	6
1999–00	Invitational	Kuala Lumpur	Special	2–5 March 2000	8
2000–01	Masters	New York City	Extended	28 September – 1 October 2000	5
2001–02	Pro Tour	New York City	Team Limited	7–9 September 2001	1
2001–02	Grand Prix	Antwerp	Limited	2–3 March 2002	8
2001–02	Masters	Osaka	Team Limited	14–17 March 2002	1
2002–03	Pro Tour	Boston	Team Limited	27–29 September 2002	1
2002–03	Grand Prix	Copenhagen	Limited	12–13 October 2002	5
2002–03	Masters	Venice	Team Limited	20–23 March 2003	5
2003–04	Nationals	Mainz	Special	30 May – 1 June 2003	1
2003–04	Pro Tour	Boston	Team Limited	12–14 September 2003	4
2003–04	Invitational	Los Angeles	Special	11–13 May 2004	7

Last updated: 4 December 2008
Source: Wizards.com

Other accomplishments:

- Rookie of the Year 1998–99
- Hall of Fame class 2008 vote leader

Preceded by (United States) Randy Buehler	Magic: The Gathering Rookie of the Year; 1999	Succeeded by (United States) Brian Davis
Preceded by Kai Budde	Magic German National Champion; 2003	Succeeded by Torben Twiefel
