= Alexander Borteh =

American poker player

Alex Borteh
- Nickname: None

World Series of Poker
- Bracelet: 1
- Money finishes: 6
- Highest WSOP Main Event finish: None

World Poker Tour
- Title: None

Alex Borteh is a professional poker player who won a World Series of Poker bracelet in a World Series of Poker event, the $3,000 Limit Hold'em event. Borteh has cashed in four WSOP events and made two final tables. In 2005, he finished in 3rd place in the $1,500 Limit Hold'em Shootout event. Borteh prefers limit hold'em to no-limit hold'em, considering the former a game that requires more skill.

Before becoming a poker player, Borteh finished second at the 2001 World Championship for Magic: The Gathering This was the tournament in which fellow bracelet winner David Williams was disqualified because of marked cards.

Borteh graduated from Olentangy High School, which is in Lewis Center, Ohio, in 2001. He earned a degree in philosophy from Ohio State University.

As of 2008, his live tournament winnings exceed $320,000.

== World Series of Poker bracelets ==
| Year | Tournament | Prize (US$) |
|---|---|---|
| 2007 | $3,000 Limit Hold'em | $225,483 |
