= Brian Selden =

American Magic: The Gathering player (born 1980)

- Nationality: (United States) American
- Pro Tour debut: 1998 Worlds – Seattle
- Winnings: US$58,105
- Pro Tour wins (Top 8): 1 (3)
- Grand Prix wins (Top 8): 0 (0)
- Lifetime Pro Points: 105
- Planeswalker Level: 41 (Battlemage)

Brian Selden (born 1980 in San Diego, California) was the winner of the 1998 Magic: The Gathering World Championship.

His strategy in the tournament was to use two cards, called Survival of the Fittest and Recurring Nightmare repeatedly. The former card puts creatures into the graveyard, while the latter allows the user to return them to the battlefield without using any mana. This results in a constant cycle of resurrected creatures. Selden used this tactic to bring back utility creatures or either Verdant Force or Spirit of the Night, both very expensive, powerful, and usually game-ending cards.

Selden received his BS in Mechanical Engineering from the University of California, Berkeley in 2003, and his MS in Mechanical Engineering from MIT in 2005.

Preceded by (Czech Republic) Jakub Slemr	Magic: The Gathering World Champion; 1998	Succeeded by (Germany) Kai Budde
