= Itaru Ishida =

Japanese Magic: The Gathering player (1979–2013)

Itaru Ishida 石田格
- Born: 16 September 1979
- Died: 13 January 2013 (aged 33)
- Nationality: (Japan) Japanese
- Pro Tour debut: Pro Tour Paris 1997
- Winnings: US$123,620
- Pro Tour wins (Top 8): 0 (1)
- Grand Prix wins (Top 8): 2 (17)
- Lifetime Pro Points: 250
- Planeswalker Level: 48 (Archmage)

Itaru Ishida (石田格) was a Japanese Magic: The Gathering player. The bulk of his success was on the Grand Prix circuit, where he reached the top eight seventeen times. In addition to his Grand Prix success, Ishida had success in the teams format, with second-place finishes at Pro Tour Seattle 2004 and at the Master Series in Tokyo (2001) and Osaka (2002). He died on January 13, 2013.

== Achievements ==
Season	Event type	Location	Format	Date	Rank
1996–97	Nationals	Tokyo	Special	5–6 July 1997	7
1997–98	Nationals	Tokyo	Special	4–5 July 1998	2
1997–98	APAC Region Championship	Tokyo	Special	26–27 July 1998	3
1998–99	Grand Prix	Manila	Sealed and Booster Draft	12–13 December 1998	8
1998–99	Grand Prix	Taipei	Limited	24–25 April 1999	4
1999–00	Grand Prix	Tohoku	Limited	11–12 September 1999	4
2000–01	Masters	Tokyo	Team Limited	16–18 March 2001	2
2000–01	Grand Prix	Taipei	Team Limited	21–22 July 2001	2
2001–02	Grand Prix	Kobe	Block Constructed	18–19 August 2001	1
2001–02	Grand Prix	Sendai	Extended	15–16 December 2001	5
2001–02	Grand Prix	Fukuoka	Sealed and Booster Draft	16–17 February 2002	3
2001–02	Masters	Osaka	Team Limited	15–17 March 2002	2
2002–03	Grand Prix	Sapporo	Block Constructed	24–25 August 2002	4
2002–03	Masters	Venice	Team Limited	21–23 March 2003	7
2002–03	Grand Prix	Kyoto	Sealed and Booster Draft	29–30 March 2003	5
2002–03	Grand Prix	Bangkok	Standard	12–13 July 2003	2
2003–04	Grand Prix	Sydney	Rochester Draft	4–5 October 2003	4
2003–04	Grand Prix	Okayama	Extended	24–25 January 2004	2
2003–04	Pro Tour	Seattle	Team Limited	9–11 July 2004	2
2005	Grand Prix	Osaka	Team Limited	8–9 January 2005	2
2005	Grand Prix	Singapore	Extended	19–20 March 2005	1
2005	Grand Prix	Kitakyushu	Extended	5–6 November 2005	7
2006	Grand Prix	Hamamatsu	Team Constructed	8–9 April 2006	3
2006	Grand Prix	Kuala Lumpur	Sealed and Booster Draft	3–4 June 2006	8

Last updated: 22 August 2009
Source: Wizards.com
