= Magic: The Gathering Pro Tour season 1998–99 =

Card game competition

1998–99 Pro Tour season
- Pro Player of the Year: (Germany) Kai Budde
- Rookie of the Year: (Germany) Dirk Baberowski
- World Champion: (Germany) Kai Budde
- Pro Tours: 5
- Grands Prix: 14
- Start of season: 5 September 1998
- End of season: 8 August 1999

The 1998–99 Pro Tour season was the fourth season of the Magic: The Gathering Pro Tour. It began on 5 September 1998 with Grand Prix Boston and ended on 8 August 1999 with the conclusion of 1999 World Championship in Tokyo. The season consisted of fourteen Grand Prix, and five Pro Tours, located in Chicago, Rome, Los Angeles, New York, and Tokyo. At the end of the season Kai Budde from Germany was awarded the Pro Player of the year title.

== Grand Prix – Boston, Lisbon ==
GP Boston (5–6 September)

1. (United States) Jon Finkel
2. (United States) Randy Buehler
3. (United States) Steven O'Mahoney-Schwartz
4. (United States) Zvi Mowshowitz
5. (United States) Darwin Kastle
6. (United States) Mike Bregoli
7. (United States) Dave Beury
8. (United States) Ben Farkas

GP Lisbon (12–13 September)

1. (Portugal) Bruno Cardoso
2. (United States) Brian Hacker
3. (United States) Randy Buehler
4. (Portugal) Helder Coelho
5. (Belgium) Jean-Louis D'Hondt
6. (France) Laurent Pagorek
7. (France) Alexis Dumay
8. (Portugal) Jorge Martins

== Pro Tour – Chicago (25–27 September 1998) ==
As in the previous season a rookie won the inaugural Pro Tour. In the finals Dirk Baberowski defeated Casey McCarrel. Jon Finkel also had another final eight showing, his third in a row.

=== Tournament data ===
Prize pool: $151,635
Players: 324
Format: Tempest Booster Draft (Tempest-Stronghold-Exodus)
Head Judge: Charlie Catino

=== Top 8 ===
Quarter-finals
1	Dirk Baberowski	3
8	Dominique Coena	1
4	Benedikt Klauser	3
5	Jon Finkel	2
3	Jeff Fung	3
6	Ryan Fuller	1
2	Casey McCarrel	3
7	Martin Cedercrantz	2

Semi-finals
Dirk Baberowski	3
Benedikt Klauser	0
Jeff Fung	0
Casey McCarrel	3

Finals
Dirk Baberowski	3
Casey McCarrel	1

Loser's Bracket

Pro Tour Chicago also had Top 8 loser's bracket, that had matches held as best of three instead of five. The first round paired the quarter-finals losers against each other. Finkel defeated Coene 2–1 and Fuller defeated Cedercrantz 2–0. In the second and final round the winners of the first round were paired against the losers of the Top 8 semi-finals. Fung defeated Finkel 2–1 and Klauser defeated Fuller 2–1.

=== Final standings ===
Place	Player	Prize	Comment
1	(Germany) Dirk Baberowski	$25,000	Pro Tour debut
2	(United States) Casey McCarrel	$15,000	2nd Final day
3	(Canada) Jeff Fung	$10,000	
4	(Austria) Benedikt Klauser	$8,000	1st Austrian in a Top 8
5	(United States) Jon Finkel	$6,500	4th Final day
6	(Canada) Ryan Fuller	$5,500	
7	(Sweden) Martin Cedercrantz	$4,800	
8	(Belgium) Dominique Coene	$4,300	

== Grand Prix – Austin, Birmingham ==
GP Austin (10–11 October)

1. (Canada) Gary Krakower
2. (United States) Darwin Kastle
3. (United States) Heath Kennel
4. (United States) Richard Van Cleave
5. (United States) Jeremy Baca
6. (United States) Tony Tsai
7. (United States) Sid Rao
8. (United States) Jonathan Pechon

GP Birmingham (17–18 October)

1. (England) Craig Jones
2. (Germany) Kai Budde
3. (United States) Darwin Kastle
4. (England) Neil Rigby
5. (Finland) Arho Toikka
6. (England) Warren Marsh
7. (Sweden) Andreas Jonsson
8. (Belgium) Jean-Louis D'Hondt

== Pro Tour – Rome (13–15 November 1998) ==
Tommi Hovi won Pro Tour Rome, thus becoming the first player to win two Pro Tours. Reportedly Hovi was particularly happy to win another Pro Tour, because he won his first due to a disqualification, and thus felt it was not a proper victory. Olle Råde became the first player to have five Top 8 appearances.

=== Tournament data ===
Prize pool: $151,635
Players: 266
Format: Extended
Head Judge: Carl Crook

=== Top 8 ===
Quarter-finals
1	Erik Lauer	1
8	Nicolas Labarre	3
4	Mark Le Pine	1
5	Federico Dato	2
3	Tommi Hovi	3
6	Justin Gary	2
2	Olle Råde	3
7	André Konstanczer	2

Semi-finals
Nicolas Labarre	3
Federico Dato	1
Tommi Hovi	3
Olle Råde	0

Finals
Nicolas Labarre	1
Tommi Hovi	3

Loser's Bracket

The first round of the loser's bracket paired the quarter-finals losers against each other. Le Pine defeated Lauer 2–0 and Gary defeated Konstanczer 2–1. In the second and final round of the loser's bracket the winners of the first round were paired against the losers of the Top 8 semi-finals. Dato defeated Gary 2–1 and Le Pine defeated Råde 2–1.

=== Final standings ===
Place	Player	Prize	Comment
1	(Finland) Tommi Hovi	$25,000	3rd Final day, First player to win two Pro Tours
2	(France) Nicolas Labarre	$15,000	
3	(United States) Mark Le Pine	$10,000	2nd Final day
4	(Italy) Federico Dato	$8,000	
5	(Sweden) Olle Råde	$6,500	5th Final day
6	(United States) Justin Gary	$5,500	
7	(United States) Erik Lauer	$4,800	
8	(Germany) André Konstanczer	$4,300	

== Grand Prix – Manila, Kyoto, San Francisco, Barcelona ==
GP Manila (12–13 December)

1. (Japan) Toshiki Tsukamoto
2. (Philippines) Scion Raguindin
3. (Philippines) Josua Rivera
4. (Philippines) Leo Gonzales
5. (Philippines) Rozano Yu
6. (Philippines) Francis Robert Profeta
7. (Philippines) GeeVee Vegara
8. (Japan) Itaru Ishida

GP San Francisco (23–24 January)

1. (United States) Richard Van Cleave
2. (United States) Mark Schick
3. (United States) John Yoo
4. (United States) Alan Comer
5. (United States) Mike Craig
6. (United States) Shawn Keller
7. (United States) Hashim Bello
8. (United States) Shawn Roush

GP Kyoto (16–17 January)

1. (Japan) Yoshikazu Ishii
2. (Japan) Hiroshi Watanabe
3. (Japan) Masami Ibamoto
4. (Japan) Tsuyoshi Fujita
5. (Japan) Tadayoshi Komiya
6. (Japan) Hirobumi Nakamura
7. (Japan) Hideaki Amano
8. (Japan) Eisaku Sueyoshi

GP Barcelona (6–7 February)

1. (Germany) Kai Budde
2. (United States) Alex Shvartsman
3. (Spain) Roc Herms
4. (France) Raphaël Lévy
5. (England) Daniel Nuttal
6. (Netherlands) Matt Henstra
7. (France) Laurent Laclavie
8. (England) Gordon Benson

== Pro Tour – Los Angeles (26–28 February 1999) ==
Steven O'Mahoney-Schwartz won Pro Tour Los Angeles defeating his friend and fellow New Yorker Jon Finkel in the final.

=== Tournament data ===
Prize pool: $151,635
Players: 337
Format: Urza's Saga Rochester Draft (Urza's Saga)
Head Judge: Charlie Catino

=== Top 8 ===
Quarter-finals
1	Lucien Bui	1
8	Jon Finkel	3
4	Worth Wollpert	3
5	Svend Geertsen	2
3	Steven O'Mahoney-Schwartz	3
6	Mike Long	1
2	Patrick Chapin	0
7	Terry Lau	3

Semi-finals
Jon Finkel	3
Worth Wollpert	1
Steven O'Mahoney-Schwartz	3^{*}
Terry Lau	2^{*}

Finals
Jon Finkel	1
Steven O'Mahoney-Schwartz	3

^{*} = The semi-final of O'Mahoney-Schwartz against Lau went over six games. One of the games had been a draw. After five games the score was 2–2 and a draw, thus the sixth game became necessary.

=== Final standings ===
Place	Player	Prize	Comment
1	(United States) Steven O'Mahoney-Schwartz	$25,000	2nd Final day
2	(United States) Jon Finkel	$15,000	5th Final day
3	(United States) Worth Wollpert	$10,000	
4	(Canada) Terry Lau	$8,000	
5	(France) Lucien Bui	$6,500	
6	(United States) Patrick Chapin	$5,500	2nd Final day
7	(Denmark) Svend Geertsen	$4,800	3rd Final day
8	(United States) Mike Long	$4,300	3rd Final day

== Grand Prix – Vienna, Kansas City, Oslo, Taipei ==
GP Vienna (13–14 March)

1. (Germany) Kai Budde
2. (Austria) Christian Gregorich
3. (United States) Jon Finkel
4. (United States) Erik Lauer
5. (United States) Randy Buehler
6. (Czech Republic) Jakub Slemr
7. (Germany) Dirk Hein
8. (Germany) Peer Kröger

GP Oslo (10–11 April)

1. (Germany) Jim Herold
2. (Finland) Mikko Lintamo
3. (Norway) Christer Ljones
4. (Norway) Bjørn Ove Leknes Skogneth
5. (Finland) Seppo Toikka
6. (United States) Steven O'Mahoney-Schwartz
7. (Germany) André Konstanczer
8. (Finland) Jonathan Brown

GP Kansas City (27–28 March)

1. (United States) Mark Gordon
2. (United States) Chris Pikula
3. (United States) Bob Maher, Jr.
4. (United States) Scott Seville
5. (United States) Jon Finkel
6. (United States) Lan D. Ho
7. (United States) Randy Buehler
8. (Canada) Vincent Johnson

GP Taipei (24–25 April)

1. (Japan) Kenichi Fujita
2. (Japan) Iwao Takemasa
3. (United States) Tobey Tamber
4. (Japan) Itaru Ishida
5. (Hong Kong) Chi Fai Ng
6. (Hong Kong) Kai Cheog Tang
7. (United States) Alex Shvartsman
8. (Taiwan) Miller Tsai

== Pro Tour – New York (30 April – 2 May 1999) ==
In the finals of Pro Tour New York Casey McCarrel defeated Shawn Keller, both playing nearly identical decks, which was designed by Ben Rubin, Lan D. Ho, and Terry Tsang, who also made the Top 8 with the deck. The concept of their decks was to quickly generate huge amounts of mana to play big spells. Rob Dougherty and David Humpherys played nearly identical decks, designed by YMG.

=== Tournament data ===
Prize pool: $151,635
Players: 308
Format: Urza's Saga Block Constructed (Urza's Saga, Urza's Legacy)
Head Judge: Dan Gray

=== Top 8 ===
Quarter-finals
1	Zvi Mowshowitz	3
8	Terry Tsang	2
5	Casey McCarrel	3
4	Christian Lührs	2
3	Shawn Keller	3
6	Nicolas Labarre	1
7	Dave Humpherys	3
2	Rob Dougherty	1

Semi-finals
Zvi Mowshowitz	2
Casey McCarrel	3
Shawn Keller	3
Dave Humpherys	1

Finals
Casey McCarrel	3
Shawn Keller	1

=== Final standings ===
Place	Player	Prize	Comment
1	(United States) Casey McCarrel	$25,000	3rd Final day
2	(United States) Shawn Keller	$15,000	
3	(United States) Zvi Mowshowitz	$10,000	
4	(United States) Dave Humpherys	$8,000	
5	(United States) Rob Dougherty	$6,500	
6	(Germany) Christian Lührs	$5,500	
7	(France) Nicolas Labarre	$4,800	2nd Final day
8	(Canada) Terry Tsang	$4,300	

== Grand Prix – Amsterdam, Washington D.C. ==
GP Amsterdam (15–16 May)

1. (Germany) Kai Budde
2. (Germany) Dirk Baberowski
3. (Germany) André Konstanczer
4. (Italy) Guido Pacifici
5. (Netherlands) Bram Snepvangers
6. (Germany) Janosch Kühn
7. (Germany) Daniel Steinsdorfer
8. (Belgium) Vincent Gieling

GP Washington D.C. (19–20 June)

1. (United States) Ben Farkas
2. (United States) Chris Pikula
3. (United States) Noah Weil
4. (United States) Zvi Mowshowitz
5. (United States) Mike Turian
6. (United States) Scott McCord
7. (United States) Mark Le Pine
8. (United States) Dennis Bentley

== 1999 World Championships – Yokohama (4–8 August 1999) ==
Kai Budde won the 1999 World Championship, defeating Mark Le Pine in the finals. The match went into the books as the shortest individual Pro Tour final ever, taking about 20 minutes. The title allowed Budde to take the Pro Player of the year title as well.

The United States defeated Germany in the team finals to win the national team title.

=== Tournament data ===
Prize pool: $250,000
Players: 208
Individual formats: Urza's Saga Rochester Draft (Urza's Saga-Urza's Legacy-Urza's Destiny), Standard, Extended
Team formats: Team Sealed (Urza's Saga-Urza's Legacy-Urza's Destiny) – Swiss; Standard – Finals
Head Judge: Charlie Catino

=== Top 8 ===
Quarter-finals
1	Jakub Slemr	2
8	Matt Linde	3
5	Mark Le Pine	3
4	Gary Wise	1
3	Jamie Parke	1
6	Kai Budde	3
7	Nicolai Herzog	1
2	Raffaele Lo Moro	3

Semi-finals
Matt Linde	2
Mark Le Pine	3
Kai Budde	3
Raffaele Lo Moro	0

Finals
Mark Le Pine	0
Kai Budde	3

=== Final standings ===
Place	Player	Prize	Comment
1	(Germany) Kai Budde	$34,000	
2	(United States) Mark Le Pine	$22,000	3rd Final day
3	(Italy) Raffaele Lo Moro	$16,000	
4	(United States) Matt Linde	$13,000	
5	(Czech Republic) Jakub Slemr	$11,000	3rd Final day
6	(United States) Jamie Parke	$9,500	
7	(Canada) Gary Wise	$8,250	
8	(Norway) Nicolai Herzog	$7,250	

=== National team competition ===
1. United States (Kyle Rose, John Hunka, Zvi Mowshowitz, Charles Kornblith)
2. Germany (Marco Blume, Patrick Mello, David Brucker, Rosario Maij)
3. Norway (Nicolai Herzog, Sturla Bingen, Bjorn Joumsen, Marius Johnsen)
4. Sweden (Jimmy Oman, Richard Soderberg, Ken Asp, Kristian Hellman)

== Pro Player of the year final standings ==
After the World Championship Kai Budde was awarded the Pro Player of the year title.

Rank	Player	Pro Points
1	(Germany) Kai Budde	75
2	(United States) Jon Finkel	65
3	(United States) Casey McCarrel	63
4	(United States) Steven O'Mahoney-Schwartz	57
5	(United States) Mark Le Pine	52
