= Magic: The Gathering Hall of Fame =

Recognition for competitive card gamers

The Magic: The Gathering Pro Tour Hall of Fame was started in 2005 to honor the most successful Magic: The Gathering Pro Tour players. The first inductions came on the tenth anniversary of the first Pro Tour event, and new classes were elected annually until 2019. After seven years without new inductees, the Hall of Fame was revived in 2026, with new classes planned every two years. Following the induction of the 2026 class, the Hall of Fame has 51 members from 13 countries.

== Eligibility ==
=== Since 2026 ===
With the 2026 revival, eligibility was based on "Top Finishes". For the 2026 class, a player needed five Top Finishes as of July 20, 2026, including at least one between 1994 and 2019 and at least one between 2020 and 2026, and had to be in good standing with Wizards of the Coast; eighteen players qualified. For the 2028 class, a player needs five Top Finishes, the first of which must have come at least eight seasons before the 2027–28 season.

=== 2005–2019 ===
Until 2019, in order to appear on the Hall of Fame selection ballot, a player had to meet the following five requirements (or the first four requirements if they had never appeared on a previous ballot):

1. The player must have participated in their first Magic: the Gathering Pro Tour at least 10 seasons prior to the current voting year.
2. The player must have at least 150 lifetime Pro Tour Points. (Prior to 2013, the threshold was 100 lifetime Pro Tour Points.)
3. The player must have at least 2 single-elimination round finishes in Pro Tours. (From 2017 onwards)
4. The player must not currently be suspended from playing Magic or be under investigation by the DCI (Previous suspension does not disqualify a player from entering the Hall of Fame.)
5. The player must not currently be removed from ballot by the voting committee. If they are currently removed by the ballot, they must finish with at least 4 Pro Points in period between the previous and current voting.

(* Pro Tour includes all Magic: The Gathering World Championship before year 2011)

== Voting process ==
=== Since 2026 ===
Since the revival, inductees are chosen by a 40-member committee hand-selected by Wizards of the Coast, made up of past Hall of Fame members, longtime Pro Tour reporters and commentators, Wizards employees with Pro Tour experience, and selected active players. Each member may vote for up to four eligible players, based on "players' performances, playing ability, integrity, sportsmanship, and contributions to the game in general". A player appearing on at least 60% of returned ballots is inducted; if no one reaches 60%, the player with the most votes is inducted. Individual ballots are private, but the totals are published.

=== 2017–2019 ===
The Selection Committee voted on whom to induct into the Hall of Fame. The committee includes Wizards of the Coast employees, WPN members, judges, long-time reporters, developers, all Hall of Famers, and every Magic player with at least 150 Pro Points. Every member of the Selection Committee gets to vote for up to five of the eligible players. Afterwards every player with at least 60% of the votes gets inducted into the Hall of Fame. If nobody gets 60% of the vote, the player with the most votes will be inducted into the Hall of Fame.

If a player received 10% or less of the votes in 3 consecutive votings, they will be removed from the Hall of Fame ballot. They will be eligible again if they score 4 Pro Tour Points during a specific period (roughly the same period between two consecutive votings).

=== Historical selection process ===
The selection procedure was changed several times. In 2005 the Selection Committee voted for five players, and the four players receiving the most votes were inducted. Then a Players' Committee voted for one player that was not already selected, and the player receiving the most votes was also inducted.

From 2006 members of the Selection Committee and the Players' Committee received the list of players eligible for induction. Each member selected five players for induction. The votes were tabulated by a weighted percentage: Selection Committee votes counted 2/3, and Players' Committee votes counted 1/3. In 2006 and 2007 the five players with the highest percentages were inducted into the Hall of Fame. Between 2008 and 2016 only the players with over 40% of the weighted votes were inducted or if no one meets this criterion the player with the highest percentage was inducted.

== Benefits ==
Since the 2026 revival, each Hall of Fame member receives an invitation to one Pro Tour of their choice per season and a Hall of Fame ring.

=== Before 2020 ===
The Hall of Fame inductees received a number of benefits for the rest of their life (unless suspended by the DCI). As of 2016–17 season, it includes the benefits below:

1. A guaranteed entry to any Pro Tour event and World Magic Cup Qualifiers
2. Appearance fee at the Pro Tour featuring the yearly Hall of Fame induction.
3. Bye(s) in Grand Prix and World Magic Cup Qualifiers.
4. Additional Magic Online Championship Series seasonal QPs.

If a Hall of Fame player is a current Platinum level member of the Pro Players Club, the higher reward will apply to them (i.e. they receive two instead of one bye in World Magic Cup Qualifiers, 20QP instead of 15QP in the Magic Online Championship Series).

Players who enter the Hall of Fame since will also receive a special commemorative ring at the induction ceremony.

== Inductees ==
Class / year	Country	Inductee	Weighted ballot %	Ballot rank within class
2005	United States	Jon Finkel	97.10%	1
2005	United States	Darwin Kastle	62.32%	2
2005	United States	Alan Comer	52.17%	3
2005	Finland	Tommi Hovi	46.38%	4
2005	Sweden	Olle Råde	34.78%	5
2006	United States	Bob Maher	60.01%	1
2006	United States	Dave Humpherys	56.78%	2
2006	France	Raphaël Lévy	42.58%	3
2006	Canada	Gary Wise	39.03%	4
2006	United States	Rob Dougherty	38.20%	5
2007	Germany	Kai Budde	90.42%	1
2007	United States	Zvi Mowshowitz	62.28%	2
2007	Japan	Tsuyoshi Fujita	49.74%	3
2007	Norway	Nicolai Herzog	41.50%	4
2007	United States	Randy Buehler	35.58%	5
2008	Germany	Dirk Baberowski	52.36%	1
2008	United States	Mike Turian	50.13%	2
2008	Netherlands	Jelger Wiegersma	48.19%	3
2008	France	Olivier Ruel	46.01%	4
2008	United States	Ben Rubin	45.62%	5
2009	France	Antoine Ruel	63.43%	1
2009	Netherlands	Kamiel Cornelissen	62.48%	2
2009	Netherlands	Frank Karsten	44.79%	3
2010	France	Gabriel Nassif	89.25%	1
2010	United States	Brian Kibler	49.36%	2
2010	Netherlands	Bram Snepvangers	40.03%	4 (Note: At 40.03%, Bram Snepvangers's ballot rank within the class was fourth. At 47.74%, Tomoharu Saito's ballot rank within the class was third, but Saito was disqualified as described in more detail in the Controversies section of this article.)
2011	Japan	Shuhei Nakamura	89.25%	1
2011	Sweden	Anton Jonsson	69.81%	2
2011	United States	Steven O'Mahoney-Schwartz	50.57%	3
2012	Brazil	Paulo Vitor Damo da Rosa	85.65%	1
2012	Japan	Kenji Tsumura	81.76%	2
2012	Japan	Masashi Oiso	76.18%	3
2012	United States	Patrick Chapin	44.91%	4
2013	United States	Luis Scott-Vargas	95.63%	1
2013	United States	William Jensen	59.97%	2
2013	United States	Ben Stark	58.96%	3
2014	Japan	Makihito Mihara	86.80%	1
2014	United States	Paul Rietzl	72.59%	2
2014	France	Guillaume Wafo-Tapa	60.91%	3
2015	United States	Eric Froehlich	66.35%	1
2015	Japan	Shouta Yasooka	62.50%	2
2015	Brazil	Willy Edel	47.60%	3
2016	United States	Owen Turtenwald	70.93%	1
2017	United States	Josh Utter-Leyton	86.31%	1
2017	Czech Republic	Martin Jůza	66.39%	2
2018	United States	Seth Manfield	65.19%	1
2018	Hong Kong	Lee Shi Tian	64.16%	2
2019	United States	Reid Duke	94.28%	1
2026	Spain	Javier Dominguez	100.00%	1
2026	Japan	Ken Yukuhiro	92.50%	2
2026	France	Jean-Emmanuel Depraz	60.00%	3

Percentages from 2005 to 2016 are weighted between the two committees; from 2017 onwards they are the share of ballots naming the player. Yuuya Watanabe was also inducted in 2016 but was removed in 2019 (see below).

=== 2026 class ===
The 2026 class was announced on August 21, 2026. Javier Dominguez appeared on all 40 ballots, the first player to be named on every ballot in a voting round; Ken Yukuhiro received 37 votes (92.5%) and Jean-Emmanuel Depraz 24 (60%), the minimum required. The induction ceremony was scheduled for November 15, 2026, at MagicCon: Atlanta. The next class will be elected in 2028.

== Controversies ==
=== Tomoharu Saito banning ===
In the ballot of 2010, Tomoharu Saito was voted into the Hall of Fame with a weighted percentage of 47.74%. However, two weeks prior to the induction Saito was disqualified during Grand Prix Florence leading to an 18-month suspension from the game. The rules do not allow currently-suspended players to be voted into the Hall of Fame. Wizards announced without further explanation that Saito would not be part of the Hall of Fame based on the 2010 ballot.

=== Bram Snepvangers miscalculation ===
In the original ballot results for 2010, Bram Snepvangers received a weighted percentage of 39.95%, barely missing the required 40%. However, in the days following the publication of results it was discovered that there had been an error in the calculations. Weights of 0.667 and 0.333 had been used for the votes from the Selection Committee and Players Committee respectively while the rules clearly stated that 0.67 and 0.33 were the correct numbers. After recalculating the scores Snepvangers landed at 40.03% and was inducted into the Hall of Fame along with Nassif and Kibler.

=== Yuuya Watanabe removal ===
In April 2019, during a deck check at Mythic Championship II in London it was found that some of Watanabe's card sleeves had been marked in a distinct way. This led to his disqualification from the tournament. On May 9, 2019, Wizards of the Coast announced that Watanabe would be removed from the Hall of Fame for cheating, as well as receiving a 30-month ban from sanctioned events and being removed from the Magic Pro League. This event made Watanabe the first and so far only player to ever be removed from the Hall of Fame.

== Inductees by country ==
Country	Number of inductees
United States	22
Japan	7
France	6
Netherlands	4
Germany	2
Sweden	2
Brazil	2
Canada	1
Spain	1
Finland	1
Norway	1
Czech Republic	1
Hong Kong	1
