= Bob Maher Jr. =

American Magic: The Gathering player

Bob Maher
- Nickname: The Great One
- Born: July 10, 1978 (age 48)
- Nationality: (United States) American
- Pro Tour debut: Pro Tour New York 1996 (junior); 1997 Pro Tour Los Angeles (senior)
- Winnings: US$157,452
- Pro Tour wins (Top 8): 1 (4)
- Grand Prix wins (Top 8): 3 (10)
- Median Pro Tour Finish: 94
- Lifetime Pro Points: 267
- Planeswalker Level: 47 (Archmage)

Robert Maher Jr. (born July 10, 1978 in Wisconsin), is a professional Magic: The Gathering player. He picked up the Magic game after sustaining a football injury in high school, and has gone on to become one of the most celebrated players in the game's history, earning the nickname "The Great One". Bob currently owns the Toy and Game distribution company ACD Distribution which is located in Middleton, Wisconsin.

== Magic: The Gathering ==
Maher played in the junior division of the very first Pro Tour in 1996. His first senior Pro Tour would be in Los Angeles in 1997. The 1999–2000 Pro Tour season would be Maher's most successful season. He would win Pro Tour Chicago and Grand Prix Seattle, make the Top 8 of Grand Prix Nagoya and take second place at the 2000 World Championship. Maher's success throughout the season earned him the Pro Player of the Year title.

In 2002, Maher was suspended from the DCI for 6 months for committing tournament fraud. He participated in false tournaments with Jason Moungey and Chad Butterfield and used the rating points gained to qualify for the World Championships. Maher received a reduced suspension for admitting his involvement after learning of the fraudulent nature of the tournaments.

Maher won the Masters Series in Yokohama in 2003 and the 2004 Magic Invitational, thus becoming the third player to win a Pro Tour, a Grand Prix, a Masters, and an Invitational. Dark Confidant, the card-design he submitted for winning the Invitational, appeared in the Ravnica: City of Guilds set, bearing his likeness. The card has been well received and has seen considerable play in nearly every sanctioned format it has been legal in. In 2010, ChannelFireball.com ranked Dark Confidant as the best Invitational card. In 2006, Maher was inducted into the Magic: The Gathering Hall of Fame as the vote leader in the Class of 2006.

From 2005 to 2014 Maher played only very infrequently on the Pro Tour. He played Pro Tour Journey Into Nyx and Pro Tour Magic 2015, and participated in Pro Tour Fate Reforged as a member of a new team.

=== Accomplishments ===
Season	Event type	Location	Format	Date	Rank
1998–99	Grand Prix	Kansas City	Extended	27–28 March 1999	3
1999–00	Pro Tour	Chicago	Extended	3–5 December 1999	1
1999–00	Grand Prix	Seattle	Extended	15–16 January 2000	1
1999–00	Grand Prix	Nagoya	Team Limited	22–23 April 2000	3
1999–00	Worlds	Brussels	Special	2–6 August 2000	2
2000–01	Masters	New York City	Extended	29 September–1 October 2000	5
2000–01	Masters	Chicago	Limited	1-3 December 2000	5
2000–01	Grand Prix	Detroit	Limited	31 March–1 April 2001	3
2001–02	Grand Prix	Montreal	Limited	13–14 October 2001	6
2001–02	Masters	New Orleans	Limited	1–4 November 2001	3
2001–02	Grand Prix	Houston	Extended	5–6 January 2002	5
2002–03	Pro Tour	Boston	Team Limited	27–29 September 2002	3
2002–03	Grand Prix	Copenhagen	Limited	12–13 October 2002	1
2002–03	Pro Tour	Houston	Extended	8–10 November 2002	7
2002–03	Grand Prix	Los Angeles	Limited	23–24 November 2002	2
2002–03	Masters	Venice	Team Limited	21–23 March 2003	3
2002–03	Masters	Yokohama	Extended	9–11 May 2003	1
2002–03	Grand Prix	Detroit	Block Constructed	12–13 July 2003	1
2003–04	Invitational	Los Angeles	Special	11–13 May 2004	1
2005	Invitational	Los Angeles	Special	17–20 May 2005	8
2006	Grand Prix	Madison	Team Constructed	25–26 March 2006	3

Last updated: 20 April 2009
Source: Wizards.com

Other accomplishments:

- Pro Player of the Year 1999–2000
- Magic Hall of Fame class of 2006

Preceded by (Germany) Kai Budde	Pro Player of the Year; 1999–2000	Succeeded by (Germany) Kai Budde
Preceded by (Sweden) Jens Thorén	Magic Invitational Champion; 2004	Succeeded by (Malaysia) Terry Soh
