= Jon Finkel =

American card game player (born 1978)

- Nickname(s): Jonny Magic; The Machine
- Born: May 18, 1978 (age 48); Brockport, New York
- Nationality: American
- Pro Tour debut: 1996 Pro Tour New York (junior); 1996 Worlds–Seattle (senior)
- Winnings: $431,884
- Pro Tour wins (Top 8): 3 (16)
- Grand Prix wins (Top 8): 3 (10)
- Median Pro Tour Finish: 61
- Lifetime Pro Points: 628
- Planeswalker Level: 48 (Archmage)

Jon Finkel (born May 18, 1978) is an American Magic: The Gathering and poker player. Finkel is one of the most decorated players in the history of professional Magic: The Gathering play and is widely regarded as one of the greatest players of all-time. During his career he has won three Grand Prix events and made the Top 8 of a record 16 Pro Tour events, winning three. In the year 2000, he became the Magic: The Gathering World Champion, as well as playing for the United States National Team, which won the team portion of the competition.

== Career ==
Finkel was born in Brockport, New York, but moved with his family to Woking, UK, in the summer of 1992 and learned about Magic: The Gathering shortly thereafter at a local game shop named Fun and Games. After he returned to the New York area in 1995 Finkel quickly made friends with the "OMS brothers", Steven and Daniel O'Mahoney-Schwartz.

In 1996 the first Pro Tour was held in New York. Finkel competed in the Junior Division of the tournament, made it to the Top 8, and won a $1,000 scholarship. After reaching another Top 8 in the Junior Division of Pro Tour Columbus Finkel had his first appearance in the senior competition of the Pro Tour at the 1996 World Championship in Seattle. A ninth-place finish earned him $3,200.

Finkel had three Top 16 finishes in the 1996–97 season, but never made it to the finals. His first Top 8 appearance was at Pro Tour Chicago 1997. In the same season Finkel won his first Grand Prix title in Rio de Janeiro, his first Pro Tour title in New York; finished third at US Nationals and the World Championship, and eventually claimed the Pro Player of the Year title.

The 1998–99 season opened with Finkel winning another Grand Prix in Boston and making his third consecutive Top 8 appearance, a feat only once before achieved by Scott Johns. Finkel finished the season second to Kai Budde in the Pro Player of the Year race. At the first Team Pro Tour in Washington the following season Finkel finished third with his friends and teammates Daniel and Steven O'Mahoney-Schwartz. After some mediocre finishes in the middle of the season Finkel won the US Nationals as well as the team and the individual portion of the World Championship. Eventually Finkel finished third in the Pro Player of the Year race. Later in 2000 Finkel also won the Magic Invitational, giving him the chance to design his own Magic card. His creation, Shadowmage Infiltrator, debuted in the Odyssey set and was later reprinted in Time Spiral and Modern Masters 2015 edition.

After two additional Top 8 appearances in the 2000–01 season Finkel's performances dropped in the 2001–02 season. Two Top 8s in 2002–03 were followed by another drop in 2003–04 and eventually by Finkel retiring from professional play. In 2005 he was inducted into the Hall of Fame as the vote leader of the inaugural class. This allowed him to attend further Pro Tours without having to qualify. In 2008 Finkel thus attended and won Pro Tour Kuala Lumpur, becoming the first player to win a Pro Tour after his induction into the Hall of Fame. Magic head designer Mark Rosewater commented on the occasion, "[Finkel] is the most naturally gifted player the game has ever seen. His accomplishments are rivaled by only one other man [Budde]".

In recent years, Finkel, like fellow Magic players David Williams and Noah Boeken, has been playing in high-level poker tournaments. He currently works as a managing partner at the hedge fund Landscape Capital Management.

As of 2021, Finkel was the Treasurer of the board of directors of Gamers Helping Gamers, a nonprofit organization that assists aspiring college students who play Magic: The Gathering by awarding them tuition scholarships.

=== Accomplishments ===
Season	Event type	Location	Format	Date	Rank
1997–98	Pro Tour	Chicago	Extended	October 10–12, 1997	3
1997–98	Grand Prix	Rio de Janeiro	Extended	January 31 – February 1, 1998	1
1997–98	Pro Tour	New York	Limited	April 17–19, 1998	1
1997–98	Grand Prix	Zurich	Limited	May 30–31, 1998	6
1997–98	Nationals	Columbus	Special	July 3–5, 1998	3
1997–98	Worlds	Seattle	Special	August 12–16, 1998	3
1997–98	Worlds	Seattle	National team	August 12–16, 1998	1
1998–99	Grand Prix	Boston	Standard	September 5–6, 1998	1
1998–99	Pro Tour	Chicago	Limited	September 25–27, 1998	5
1998–99	Invitational	Barcelona	Special	February 4–7, 1999	4
1998–99	Pro Tour	Los Angeles	Limited	February 26–28, 1999	2
1998–99	Grand Prix	Vienna	Extended	March 13–14, 1999	3
1998–99	Grand Prix	Kansas City	Extended	March 27–28, 1999	5
1999–00	Pro Tour	Washington D.C.	Team Limited	September 3–5, 1999	3
1999–00	Invitational	Kuala Lumpur	Special	March 2–5, 2000	2
1999–00	Grand Prix	St. Louis	Team Limited	May 13–14, 2000	1
1999–00	Nationals	Orlando	Special	June 8–11 2000	1
1999–00	Grand Prix	Pittsburgh	Team Limited	June 24–25, 2000	3
1999–00	Worlds	Brussels	Special	August 2–6, 2000	1
1999–00	Worlds	Brussels	National team	August 2–6, 2000	1
2000–01	Invitational	Sydney	Special	November 16–19, 2000	1
2000–01	Masters	Chicago	Limited	November 30 – December 1, 2000	2
2000–01	Pro Tour	Chicago	Standard	December 1–3, 2000	5
2000–01	Pro Tour	Los Angeles	Limited	February 2–4, 2001	4
2000–01	Masters	Barcelona	Block Constructed	May 4–6, 2001	3
2002–03	Invitational	Seattle	Special	October 18–20, 2002	3
2002–03	Pro Tour	Chicago	Limited	January 17–19, 2003	3
2002–03	Pro Tour	Yokohama	Limited	May 9–11, 2003	4
2002–03	Grand Prix	Amsterdam	Team Limited	June 7–8, 2003	2
2002–03	Nationals	San Diego	Special	June 27–29, 2003	7
2003–04	Grand Prix	Washington D.C.	Team Limited	April 17–18, 2004	4
2008	Pro Tour	Kuala Lumpur	Limited	February 15–17, 2008	1
2012	Pro Tour	Honolulu	Standard and Booster Draft	February 10–12, 2012	3
2012	Pro Tour	Barcelona	Block Constructed and Booster Draft	May 11–13, 2012	5
2012–13	Players Championship	Indianapolis	Special	August 29–31, 2012	4
2015–16	Pro Tour	Milwaukee	Standard and Booster Draft	October 16–18, 2015	3
2015–16	Pro Tour	Madrid	Standard and Booster Draft	April 22–24, 2016	5
2016–17	Grand Prix	Kyoto	Limited	July 22–23, 2017	4
2017–18	Pro Tour	Las Vegas	Team Limited	September 23, 2018	1

Last updated: October 25, 2023
Source: Wizards.com

In addition, Finkel was inducted into the Hall of Fame as the class of 2005 vote leader. Finkel holds the highest vote percentage of any inductee.

== In popular culture ==
Finkel is the subject of a 2005 biography by author David Kushner, entitled Jonny Magic & the Card Shark Kids—How a Gang of Geeks Beat the Odds and Stormed Las Vegas. The book recounts Finkel's rise to Magic stardom and his subsequent exploits as a poker player and blackjack card counter.

In 2011, Alyssa Bereznak, an intern for tech website Gizmodo wrote an article about two dates she had with Finkel, which was picked up by Forbes, The Washington Post and CBS. The article was critical of Finkel for not revealing he played Magic on his OkCupid dating profile, eliciting negative comments against the writer from a number of people involved in tech and geek culture, notably actress Felicia Day and Playboy Playmate of the Year Sara Jean Underwood.

Preceded by (Canada) Canada; Gary Krakower; Michael Donais; Ed Ito; Gabriel Tsang	Magic: The Gathering Team World Champion; With: Matt Linde; Mike Long; Bryce Currence; 1998	Succeeded by (United States) United States; Kyle Rose; John Hunka; Zvi Mowshowitz; Charles Kornblith
Preceded by (Canada) Paul McCabe	Pro Player of the Year; 1997–98	Succeeded by (Germany) Kai Budde
Preceded by Kyle Rose	Magic US National Champion; 2000	Succeeded by Trevor Blackwell
Preceded by (Germany) Kai Budde	Magic World Champion; 2000	Succeeded by (Netherlands) Tom van de Logt
Preceded by (United States) United States; Kyle Rose; John Hunka; Zvi Mowshowitz; Charles Kornblith	Magic: The Gathering Team World Champion; With: Chris Benafel; Frank Hernandez; Aaron Forsythe; 2000	Succeeded by (United States) United States; Eugene Harvey; Trevor Blackwell; Brian Hegstad
Preceded by (United States) Chris Pikula	Magic Invitational Champion; 2000	Succeeded by (Germany) Kai Budde
