= List of Magic: The Gathering Pro Tour events =

This is a list of all Magic: The Gathering Pro Tour events. Pro Tours are professional, invite-only tournaments featuring large cash prizes. The World Championships were considered a Pro Tour from 1996 to 2011, but were discontinued in 2012. When the World Championship was reintroduced in 2013 it was changed to a smaller scale non-Pro Tour event. From 2019, Pro Tours were rebranded Mythic Championships, three of which per year were held with physical cards, three in Magic: The Gathering Arena. From 2020, they were again rebranded as Players Tour events, with twelve events to be held each year: three series per year, each consisting of three regional events (Americas, Europe, and Asia–Pacific) which served as qualifiers for a single finals event for that series. MTG Arena would also offer Pro Tour-like events still called Mythic Invitationals, with a US$750,000 prize pool.

However, due to the COVID-19 pandemic, all in-person events scheduled to occur after 9 February 2020 were cancelled until further notice; a different set of MTG Arena tournaments were scheduled in their place. In particular, the 2020 season was reworked by cancelling the April finals event for Players Tour Series 1, and replacing the three regional events of Players Tour Series 2 with four online events dubbed Players Tour Online, followed by a single online event in August that served as the finals for both Series 1 and Series 2. The Mythic Invitationals planned for May and July (to coincide with the releases of Ikoria: Lair of Behemoths and Core 2021, respectively) were also replaced by a single Mythic Invitational in September. Both the Series 1/2 Final and the 2020 Mythic Invitational served as qualifiers for a 32-player event to culminate the 2020 season, called the 2020 Season Grand Finals. A yet another rebranding had the most high-profile MTG events, still held solely online on MTG Arena due to the pandemic, called X Championships for the next two seasons, the X marking the name of the most recent published set.

Finally, in February 2023, physical events returned, once again called Pro Tours, alongside an MTG Arena-only series called Arena Championships. The new Pro Tours, the name returning after a 4½ year absence, are currently held three times a year, supposedly twice in North America and once in Europe, though the 2025 season has only tournament locations in the United States. The Pro Tours are named after the most recent set, which is also played during the booster draft portion of the competition.

The first Pro Tour was held in New York City in 1996. Invitations are usually earned by winning a qualifier tournament. Other means of qualifying include finishing high in the previous Pro Tour, World Championships, Spotlight Series tournament, or receiving an entry due to being in the Magic Hall of Fame.

== List of Pro Tours ==
Key

*	World Championship
	Played in MTG Arena
†	denotes format used for the individual Top 8 in mixed-format PTs

Season	Name (Note: Beginning with the 2012 Pro Tour season, Wizards of the Coast began naming Pro Tours with the title of the expansion set released at around the same time as the Pro Tour. If the name of the expansion set has not yet been announced, the expansion set codename is used instead.)	Location	Host country	Format	Date	Prize	Winner	Players
1996	—	New York	United States	Standard (modified (Note: Pro Tour New York 1996 used a modified Standard format wherein each decklist had to include at least 5 cards of each set in Standard.))	16–18 February 1996	$30,000	(United States) Michael Loconto	239
1996	—	Los Angeles	United States	Booster Draft	5–7 May 1996	$100,000	(United States) Shawn "Hammer" Regnier	179
1996	—	Columbus	United States	Block Constructed	6–7 July 1996	$125,000	(Sweden) Olle Råde	136
1996	—	Seattle *	United States	mixed	14–18 August 1996	$132,000	(Australia) Tom Chanpheng	125
1996–97	—	Atlanta	United States	Sealed Deck	13–15 September 1996	$150,000	(Germany) Frank Adler	192
1996–97	—	Dallas	United States	Standard	22–24 November 1996	$150,000	(Canada) Paul McCabe	242
1996–97	—	Los Angeles	United States	Rochester Draft	28 February–2 March 1997	$150,000	(Finland) Tommi Hovi	236
1996–97	—	Paris	France	Block Constructed	11–13 April 1997	$150,000	(United States) Mike Long	223
1996–97	—	New York	United States	Booster Draft	30 May–1 June 1997	$150,000	(Canada) Terry Borer	259
1996–97	—	Seattle *	United States	mixed	13–17 August 1997	$250,000	(Czech Republic) Jakub Slemr	153
1997–98	—	Chicago	United States	Extended	10–12 October 1997	$151,635	(United States) Randy Buehler	324
1997–98	—	Mainz	Germany	Rochester Draft	5–7 December 1997	$151,635	(United States) Matt Place	291
1997–98	—	Los Angeles	United States	Block Constructed	6–8 March 1998	$151,635	(United States) David Price	342
1997–98	—	New York	United States	Booster Draft	17–19 April 1998	$151,635	(United States) Jon Finkel	
1997–98	—	Seattle *	United States	Booster Draft, Standard^{†}, Block Constructed, Team Sealed	12–16 August 1998	$251,620	(United States) Brian Selden	203
1998–99	—	Chicago	United States	Rochester Draft	25–27 September 1998	$151,635	(Germany) Dirk Baberowski	324
1998–99	—	Rome	Italy	Extended	13–15 November 1998	$151,635	(Finland) Tommi Hovi	266
1998–99	—	Los Angeles	United States	Rochester Draft	26–28 February 1999	$151,635	(United States) Steven O'Mahoney-Schwartz	337
1998–99	—	New York	United States	Block Constructed	30 April–2 May 1999	$151,635	(United States) Casey McCarrel	308
1998–99	—	Yokohama *	Japan	Standard^{†}, Rochester Draft, Extended, Team Sealed	4–8 August 1999	$251,620	(Germany) Kai Budde	208
1999–00	—	Washington, D.C.	United States	Team Rochester	3–5 September 1999	$100,230	(United States) Rob Dougherty (United States) Dave Humpherys (United States) Darwin Kastle	243
1999–00	—	London	Great Britain	Booster Draft	15–17 October 1999	$151,635	(United States) Kyle Rose	310
1999–00	—	Chicago	United States	Extended	3–5 December 1999	$151,635	(United States) Bob Maher, Jr.	344
1999–00	—	Los Angeles	United States	Booster Draft	4–6 February 2000	$151,635	(United States) Trevor Blackwell	337
1999–00	—	New York	United States	Block Constructed	14–16 April 2000	$151,635	(Norway) Sigurd Eskeland	310
1999–00	—	Brussels *	Belgium	Standard^{†}, Booster Draft, Block Constructed, Team Sealed	2–6 August 2000	$251,620	(United States) Jon Finkel	273
2000–01	—	New York	United States	Team Rochester	29 September–1 October 2000	$202,200	(United States) Scott Johns (United States) Mike Turian (Canada) Gary Wise	330
2000–01	—	Chicago	United States	Standard	1–3 December 2000	$200,130	(Germany) Kai Budde	332
2000–01	—	Los Angeles	United States	Rochester Draft	2–4 February 2001	$200,130	(United States) Michael Pustilnik	327
2000–01	—	Tokyo	Japan	Block Constructed	16–18 March 2001	$200,130	(United States) Zvi Mowshowitz	270
2000–01	—	Barcelona	Spain	Booster Draft	4–6 May 2001	$200,130	(Germany) Kai Budde	335
2000–01	—	Toronto *	Canada	Standard^{†}, Booster Draft, Extended, Team Rochester	8–12 August 2001	$399,200	(Netherlands) Tom Van de Logt	296
2001–02	—	New York	United States	Team Rochester	7–9 September 2001	$202,200	(Germany) Kai Budde (Germany) Dirk Baberowski (Germany) Marco Blume	426
2001–02	—	New Orleans	United States	Extended	2–4 November 2001	$200,130	(Germany) Kai Budde	355
2001–02	—	San Diego	United States	Rochester Draft	11–13 January 2002	$200,130	(France) Farid Meraghni	348
2001–02	—	Osaka	Japan	Block Constructed	15–17 March 2002	$200,130	(United States) Ken Ho	277
2001–02	—	Nice	France	Booster Draft	3–5 May 2002	$200,130	(Norway) Eivind Nitter	332
2001–02	—	Sydney *	Australia	Standard^{†}, Booster Draft, Block Constructed, Team Rochester	14–18 August 2002	$372,200	(Brazil) Carlos Romão	245
2002–03	—	Boston	United States	Team Rochester	27–29 September 2002	$200,100	(Germany) Kai Budde (Germany) Dirk Baberowski (Germany) Marco Blume	363
2002–03	—	Houston	United States	Extended	8–10 November 2002	$200,130	(United States) Justin Gary	351
2002–03	—	Chicago	United States	Rochester Draft	17–19 January 2003	$200,130	(Germany) Kai Budde	349
2002–03	—	Venice	Italy	Block Constructed	21–23 March 2003	$200,130	(United States) Osyp Lebedowicz	310
2002–03	—	Yokohama	Japan	Booster Draft	9–11 May 2003	$200,130	(Sweden) Mattias Jorstedt	243
2002–03	—	Berlin *	Germany	Standard^{†}, Booster Draft, Extended, Team Rochester	6–10 August 2003	$421,130	(Germany) Daniel Zink	309
2003–04	—	Boston	United States	Team Rochester	12–14 September 2003	$200,100	(United States) Brock Parker (United States) Matt Linde (United States) William Jensen	399
2003–04	—	New Orleans	United States	Extended	30 October–2 November 2003	$200,130	(Sweden) Rickard Österberg	318
2003–04	—	Amsterdam	Netherlands	Rochester Draft	16–18 January 2004	$200,130	(Norway) Nicolai Herzog	346
2003–04	—	Kobe	Japan	Block Constructed	27–29 February 2004	$200,130	(Japan) Masashiro Kuroda	239
2003–04	—	San Diego	United States	Booster Draft	14–16 May 2004	$200,130	(Norway) Nicolai Herzog	312
2003–04	—	Seattle	United States	Team Rochester	9–11 July 2004	$200,100	(Netherlands) Kamiel Cornelissen (Netherlands) Jelger Wiegersma (Netherlands) Jeroen Remie	321
2003–04	—	San Francisco *	United States	Standard^{†}, Booster Draft, Block Constructed, Team Rochester	1–5 September 2004	$416,130	(Netherlands) Julien Nuijten	304
2005	—	Columbus	United States	Extended	29–31 October 2004	$200,130	(France) Pierre Canali	286
2005	—	Nagoya	Japan	Rochester Draft	28–30 January 2005	$200,130	(Japan) Shu Komuro	236
2005	—	Atlanta	United States	Team Rochester	11–13 March 2005	$200,100	(Canada) Gabriel Tsang (Canada) David Rood (France) Gabriel Nassif	357
2005	—	Philadelphia	United States	Block Constructed	6–8 May 2005	$194,898	(United States) Gadiel Szleifer	311
2005	—	London	Great Britain	Booster Draft	8–10 July 2005	$200,130	(Belgium) Geoffrey Siron	314
2005	—	Los Angeles	United States	Extended	28–30 October 2005	$200,130	(France) Antoine Ruel	340
2005	—	Yokohama *	Japan	Standard^{†}, Booster Draft, Extended, Team Rochester	30 November–4 December 2005	$403,130	(Japan) Katsuhiro Mori	287
2006	—	Honolulu	United States	Standard	3–5 March 2006	$240,245	(United States) Mark Herberholz	410
2006	—	Prague	Czech Republic	Booster Draft	5–7 May 2006	$240,245	(Japan) Takuya Osawa	415
2006	—	Charleston	United States	Team Block Constructed	16–18 June 2006	$234,000	(Japan) Tomohiro Kaji (Japan) Shouta Yasooka (Japan) Tomoharu Saitou	525
2006	—	Kobe	Japan	Booster Draft	20–22 October 2006	$240,245	(Germany) Jan-Moritz Merkel	388
2006	—	Paris *	France	Standard^{†}, Booster Draft, Extended, Team Rochester	29 November–3 December 2006	$465,245	(Japan) Makihito Mihara	356
2007	—	Geneva	Switzerland	Booster Draft	9–11 February 2007	$240,245	(United States) Mike Hron	387
2007	—	Yokohama	Japan	Block Constructed	20–22 April 2007	$240,245	(France) Guillaume Wafo-Tapa	387
2007	—	San Diego	United States	Two-Headed Giant Booster Draft	29 June–1 July 2007	$240,500	(United States) Chris Lachmann (United States) Jacob Van Lunen	390
2007	—	Valencia	Spain	Extended	12–14 October 2007	$240,245	(France) Remi Fortier	424
2007	—	New York *	United States	Standard^{†}, Booster Draft, Legacy, Team Two-Headed Giant Booster Draft	6–9 December 2007	$407,800	(Israel) Uri Peleg	386
2008	—	Kuala Lumpur	Malaysia	Booster Draft	15–17 February 2008	$230,795	(United States) Jon Finkel	346
2008	—	Hollywood	United States	Standard	23–25 May 2008	$230,795	(United States) Charles Gindy	371
2008	—	Berlin	Germany	Extended	31 October–2 November 2008	$230,795	(United States) Luis Scott-Vargas	454
2008	—	Memphis *	United States	Standard^{†}, Booster Draft, Extended, Team Constructed (Standard, Extended, Legacy)	11–14 December 2008	$437,670	(Finland) Antti Malin	329
2009	—	Kyoto	Japan	Standard^{†}, Booster Draft	27 February–1 March 2009	$230,795	(France) Gabriel Nassif	381
2009	—	Honolulu	United States	Block Constructed, Booster Draft^{†}	5–7 June 2009	$230,795	(Japan) Kazuya Mitamura	396
2009	—	Austin	United States	Extended^{†}, Booster Draft	16–18 October 2009	$230,795	(United States) Brian Kibler	417
2009	—	Rome *	Italy	Standard^{†}, Booster Draft, Extended, Team Constructed (Standard, Extended, Legacy)	19–22 November 2009	$437,670	(Portugal) André Coimbra	409
2010	—	San Diego	United States	Standard^{†}, Booster Draft	19–21 February 2010	$230,795	(Germany) Simon Görtzen	413
2010	—	San Juan	Puerto Rico	Block Constructed, Booster Draft^{†}	28–30 May 2010	$230,795	(Brazil) Paulo Vitor Damo da Rosa	396
2010	—	Amsterdam	Netherlands	Extended^{†}, Booster Draft	3–5 September 2010	$230,795	(United States) Paul Rietzl	457
2010	—	Chiba *	Japan	Standard^{†}, Booster Draft, Extended, Team Constructed (Standard, Extended, Legacy)	9–12 December 2010	$437,670	(France) Guillaume Matignon	352
2011	—	Paris	France	Standard^{†}, Booster Draft	10–13 February 2011	$230,795	(United States) Ben Stark	483
2011	—	Nagoya	Japan	Block Constructed, Booster Draft^{†}	10–12 June 2011	$230,795	(United States) David Sharfman	364
2011	—	Philadelphia	United States	Modern^{†}, Booster Draft	2–4 September 2011	$230,795	(Italy) Samuele Estratti	417
2011	—	San Francisco *	United States	Standard^{†}, Booster Draft, Modern, Team Constructed (Standard, Modern, Legacy)	17–20 November 2011		(Japan) Jun'ya Iyanaga	375
2012	Pro Tour Dark Ascension	Honolulu	United States	Standard^{†}, Booster Draft	10–12 February 2012	$233,500	(United States) Brian Kibler	445
2012	Pro Tour Avacyn Restored	Barcelona	Spain	Block Constructed^{†}, Booster Draft	11–13 May 2012	$233,500	(Canada) Alexander Hayne	379
2012–13	Pro Tour Return to Ravnica	Seattle	United States	Modern^{†}, Booster Draft	19–21 October 2012	$233,500	(Czech Republic) Stanislav Cifka	383
2012–13	Pro Tour Gatecrash	Montreal	Canada	Standard^{†}, Booster Draft	15–17 February 2013	$250,000	(United States) Tom Martell	329
2012–13	Pro Tour Dragon's Maze	San Diego	United States	Block Constructed^{†}, Booster Draft	17–19 May 2013	$250,000	(United States) Craig Wescoe	388
2013–14	Pro Tour Theros	Dublin	Ireland	Standard^{†}, Booster Draft	11–13 October 2013	$250,000	(France) Jérémy Dezani	428
2013–14	Pro Tour Born of the Gods	Valencia	Spain	Modern^{†}, Booster Draft	21–23 February 2014	$250,000	(Canada) Shaun McLaren	393
2013–14	Pro Tour Journey into Nyx	Atlanta	United States	Block Constructed^{†}, Booster Draft	16–18 May 2014	$250,000	(United States) Patrick Chapin	349
2013–14	Pro Tour Magic 2015	Portland	United States	Standard^{†}, Booster Draft	1–3 August 2014	$250,000	(Slovakia) Ivan Floch	358
2014–15	Pro Tour Khans of Tarkir	Honolulu	United States	Standard^{†}, Booster Draft	10–12 October 2014	$250,000	(United States) Ari Lax	357
2014–15	Pro Tour Fate Reforged	Washington, D.C.	United States	Modern^{†}, Booster Draft	6–8 February 2015	$250,000	(Spain) Antonio Del Moral León	407
2014–15	Pro Tour Dragons of Tarkir	Brussels	Belgium	Standard^{†}, Booster Draft	10–12 April 2015	$250,000	(Denmark) Martin Dang	407
2014–15	Pro Tour Magic Origins	Vancouver	Canada	Standard^{†}, Booster Draft	31 July–2 August 2015	$250,000	(Sweden) Joel Larsson	393
2015–16	Pro Tour Battle for Zendikar	Milwaukee	United States	Standard^{†}, Booster Draft	16–18 October 2015	$250,000	(Japan) Kazuyuki Takimura	367
2015–16	Pro Tour Oath of the Gatewatch	Atlanta	United States	Modern^{†}, Booster Draft	5–7 February 2016	$250,000	(United States) Jiachen Tao	390
2015–16	Pro Tour Shadows over Innistrad	Madrid	Spain	Standard^{†}, Booster Draft	22–24 April 2016	$250,000	(United States) Steve Rubin	378
2015–16	Pro Tour Eldritch Moon	Sydney	Australia	Standard^{†}, Booster Draft	5–7 August 2016	$250,000	(Czech Republic) Lukas Blohon	302
2016–17	Pro Tour Kaladesh	Honolulu	United States	Standard^{†}, Booster Draft	14–16 October 2016	$250,000	(Japan) Shouta Yasooka	466
2016–17	Pro Tour Aether Revolt	Dublin	Ireland	Standard^{†}, Booster Draft	3–5 February 2017	$250,000	(Brazil) Lucas Esper Berthoud	425
2016–17	Pro Tour Amonkhet	Nashville	United States	Standard^{†}, Booster Draft	12–14 May 2017	$250,000	(United States) Gerry Thompson	378
2016–17	Pro Tour Hour of Devastation	Kyoto	Japan	Standard^{†}, Booster Draft	28–30 July 2017	$250,000	(Brazil) Paulo Vitor Damo da Rosa	462
2017–18	Pro Tour Ixalan	Albuquerque	United States	Standard^{†}, Booster Draft	3–5 November 2017	$250,000	(United States) Seth Manfield	455
2017–18	Pro Tour Rivals of Ixalan	Bilbao	Spain	Modern^{†}, Booster Draft	2–4 February 2018	$250,000	(Argentina) Luis Salvatto	464
2017–18	Pro Tour Dominaria	Richmond	United States	Standard^{†}, Booster Draft	1–3 June 2018	$250,000	(United States) Wyatt Darby	460
2017–18	Pro Tour 25th Anniversary	Minneapolis	United States	Team Trios Constructed	3–5 August 2018	$850,000	(United States) Allen Wu (Canada) Ben Hull (United States) Gregory Orange	495
2018–19	Pro Tour Guilds of Ravnica	Atlanta	United States	Standard^{†}, Booster Draft	9–11 November 2018	$250,000	(United States) Andrew Elenbogen	510
2018–19	Mythic Championship I	Cleveland	United States	Standard^{†}, Booster Draft	22–24 February 2019	$500,000	(United Kingdom) Autumn Burchett	498
2018–19	Mythic Championship II	London	Great Britain	Modern^{†}, Booster Draft	26–28 April 2019	$500,000	(United States) Eli Loveman	515
2018–19	Mythic Championship III	Las Vegas	United States	Standard, played on MTG Arena	21–23 June 2019	$750,000	(Argentina) Matias Leveratto	68
2018–19	Mythic Championship IV	Barcelona	Spain	Modern^{†}, Booster Draft	26–28 July 2019	$500,000	(Germany) Thoralf Severin	458
2018–19	Mythic Championship V	Long Beach	United States	Standard, played on MTG Arena	18–20 October 2019	$750,000	(Spain) Javier Dominguez	68
2018–19	Mythic Championship VI	Richmond	United States	Standard^{†}, Booster Draft	8–10 November 2019	$500,000	(Czech Republic) Ondřej Stráský	495
2018–19	Mythic Championship VII	Long Beach	United States	Standard, played on MTG Arena	6–8 December 2019	$750,000	(Poland) Piotr Głogowski	68
2020	Players Tour Brussels 2020 (Series 1, Europe)	Brussels	Belgium	Pioneer^{†}, Booster Draft	31 January – 2 February 2020	$200,000	(Sweden) Joel Larsson	384
2020	Players Tour Nagoya 2020 (Series 1, Asia-Pacific)	Nagoya	Japan	Pioneer^{†}, Booster Draft	1–2 February 2020	$150,000	(Japan) Kenta Harane	192
2020	Players Tour Phoenix 2020 (Series 1, Americas)	Phoenix	United States	Pioneer^{†}, Booster Draft	7–9 February 2020	$250,000	(United States) Corey Burkhart	354
2020	Players Tour Online 1 (Series 2)	Online	N/A	Standard, played on MTG Arena	13-14 June 2020	$150,000	(Sweden) Elias Watsfeldt	195
2020	Players Tour Online 2 (Series 2)	Online	N/A	Standard, played on MTG Arena	13-14 June 2020	$150,000	(Japan) Ryuji Murae	242
2020	Players Tour Online 3 (Series 2)	Online	N/A	Standard, played on MTG Arena	19-20 June 2020	$150,000	(United States) William Craddock	151
2020	Players Tour Online 4 (Series 2)	Online	N/A	Standard, played on MTG Arena	20-21 June 2020	$150,000	(Japan) Akira Asahara	317
2020	Players Tour Finals 2020 (Series 1 and 2)	Online	N/A	Standard, played on MTG Arena	25 July - 1 August 2020	$250,000	(Germany) Kristof Prinz	145
2020	2020 Mythic Invitational	Online	N/A	Historic, played on MTG Arena	10–13 September 2020	$250,000	(United States) Seth Manfield	160
2020	2020 Season Grand Finals	Online	N/A	Standard^{†}, Historic, played on MTG Arena	9–11 October 2020	$250,000	(United States) Austin Bursavich	32
2020-21	Zendikar Rising Championship	Online	N/A	Historic^{†}, Standard, played on MTG Arena	4–6 December 2020	$250,000	(United Kingdom) Brad Barclay	184
2020-21	Kaldheim Championship	Online	N/A	Standard^{†}, Historic, played on MTG Arena	26-28 March 2021	$250,000	(Germany) Arne Huschenbeth	211
2020-21	Strixhaven Championship	Online	N/A	Historic^{†}, Standard, played on MTG Arena	4-6 June 2021	$250,000	(United States) Sam Pardee	251
2021-22	Innistrad Championship	Online	N/A	Historic^{†}, Standard, played on MTG Arena	3-5 December 2021	$450,000	(Japan) Yuuki Ichikawa	252
2021-22	Neon Dynasty Championship	Online	N/A	Alchemy^{†}, Historic, played on MTG Arena	11-13 March 2022	$450,000	(United States) Eli Kassis	229
2021-22	New Capenna Championship	Online	N/A	Standard^{†}, Historic, played on MTG Arena	20-22 May 2022	$450,000	(Germany) Jan-Moritz Merkel	223
2022-23	Arena Championship 1	Online	N/A	Alchemy^{†}, Booster Draft, played on MTG Arena	24-26 September 2022	$200,000	(United Kingdom) Sam Rolph	32
2022-23	Pro Tour Phyrexia	Philadelphia	United States	Pioneer^{†}, Booster Draft	17-19 February 2023	$500,000	(United States) Reid Duke	218
2022-23	Arena Championship 2	Online	N/A	Historic^{†}, Booster Draft, played on MTG Arena	18-19 March 2023	$200,000	(Japan) Hiroshi Onizuka	31
2022-23	Pro Tour March of the Machine	Minneapolis	United States	Standard^{†}, Booster Draft	5-7 May 2023	$500,000	(United States) Nathan Steuer	252
2022-23	Arena Championship 3	Online	N/A	Standard^{†}, Booster Draft, played on MTG Arena	27-28 May 2023	$200,000	(United States) Benjamin Broadstone	32
2022-23	Pro Tour Lord of the Rings	Barcelona	Spain	Modern^{†}, Booster Draft	28-30 July 2023	$500,000	(United States) Jake Beardsley	268
2022-23	Arena Championship 4	Online	N/A	Historic^{†}, Booster Draft, played on MTG Arena	7-8 October 2023	$200,000	(Japan) Shinya Saito	32
2024	Pro Tour Murders at Karlov Manor	Chicago	United States	Pioneer^{†}, Booster Draft	23-25 February 2024	$500,000	(United States) Seth Manfield	258
2024	Arena Championship 5	Online	N/A	Explorer^{†}, Booster Draft, played on MTG Arena	30-31 March 2024	$200,000	(Spain) Toni Ramis Pascual	32
2024	Pro Tour Thunder Junction	Seattle	United States	Standard^{†}, Booster Draft	26-28 April 2024	$500,000	(Japan) Yoshihiko Ikawa	207
2024	Pro Tour Modern Horizons 3	Amsterdam	Netherlands	Modern^{†}, Booster Draft	28-30 June 2024	$500,000	(Denmark) Simon Nielsen	243
2024	Arena Championship 6	Online	N/A	Historic^{†}, Booster Draft, played on MTG Arena	13-14 July 2024	$200,000	(Netherlands) Wouter Noordzij	32
2024	Arena Championship 7	Online	N/A	Standard, played on MTG Arena	14-15 December 2024	$250,000	(Japan) Keisuke Sato	48
2025	Pro Tour Aetherdrift	Chicago	United States	Standard^{†}, Booster Draft	21-23 February 2025	$500,000	(United States) Matthew Nass	348
2025	Arena Championship 8	Online	N/A	Explorer, played on MTG Arena	29-30 March 2025	$250,000	(United Kingdom) Kristoffer Lindqvist	50
2025	Pro Tour FINAL FANTASY	Las Vegas	United States	Standard^{†}, Booster Draft	20-22 June 2025	$500,000	(Japan) Ken Yukuhiro	331
2025	Arena Championship 9	Online	N/A	Standard, played on MTG Arena	9-10 August 2025	$250,000	(Italy) Raffaele Mazza	37
2025	Pro Tour Edge of Eternities	Atlanta	United States	Modern^{†}, Booster Draft	26-28 September 2025	$500,000	(United States) Michael DeBenedetto-Plummer	300
2025	Arena Championship 10	Online	N/A	Timeless, played on MTG Arena	20-21 December 2025	$250,000	(United States) Michael DeBenedetto-Plummer	109
2026	Pro Tour Lorwyn Eclipsed	Richmond	United States	Standard^{†}, Booster Draft	30 January - 1 February 2026	$500,000	(Denmark) Christoffer Larsen	304
2026	Arena Championship 11	Online	N/A	Standard, played on MTG Arena	21-22 February 2026	$250,000	(Brazil) Marcelo Cavalcante	119
2026	Pro Tour Secrets of Strixhaven	Las Vegas	United States	Standard^{†}, Booster Draft	1-3 May 2026	$500,000	(United States) Nathan Steuer	324
2026	Arena Championship 12	Online	N/A	Historic, played on MTG Arena	23-24 May 2026	$250,000	(Japan) Satoshi Nakamura	109
2026	Pro Tour Marvel Super Heroes	Amsterdam	Netherlands	Booster Draft^{†}, Modern	17-19 July 2026	$500,000	(Japan) Yuuki Ichikawa	362
2026	Arena Championship 13	Online	N/A	Standard, played on MTG Arena	24-25 October 2026	$250,000	(United States) Gage Fevold	176
2027	Pro Tour Nauctis	Detroit	United States	Modern^{†}, Booster Draft	26-28 February 2027	$500,000	TBD	TBA
2027	Arena Championship 14	Online	N/A	Pioneer, played on MTG Arena	13-14 March 2026	$250,000	TBD	TBA
2027	Pro Tour Darkhold Destiny	Tokyo	Japan	Standard^{†}, Booster Draft	14-16 May 2027	$500,000	TBD	TBA
2027	Limited Championship 2027	Minneapolis	United States	Sealed?, Booster Draft?^{†}	18-20 June 2027	$500,000	TBD	TBA
2027	Arena Championship 15	Online	N/A	Standard, played on MTG Arena	10-11 July 2026	$250,000	TBD	TBA
2027	Pro Tour TBA	Las Vegas	United States	Standard^{†}, Booster Draft	27-29 August 2027	$500,000	TBD	TBA
2027	Arena Championship 16	Online	N/A	Historic, played on MTG Arena	16-17 October 2027	$250,000	TBD	TBA

== Pro Tours by country ==
Short summary of Pro Tour wins by country:

M:TG PT wins by country (updated as of AC 13)
Rank	Country	Wins
1	United States	62
2	Japan	21
3	Germany	16
4	France	9
5	Canada	7
6	Sweden	6
7	Brazil	5
8	Norway	4
8	Czech Republic	4
8	Netherlands	4
8	Great Britain	4
12	Finland	3
12	Spain	3
12	Denmark	3
15	Argentina	2
15	Italy	2
17	Australia	1
17	Belgium	1
17	Israel	1
17	Portugal	1
17	Slovakia	1
17	Poland	1

By default, the detailed table below is sorted in descending order, first by number of PTs won, then by number of winning players, then by number of PTs hosted, and finally by alphabetical order of the country.

The totals for each of the three columns will be different from each other, for several reasons:

- Team Pro Tours feature multiple winners, possibly from different countries.
- The same individual may win multiple Pro Tours.
- Future Pro Tours will already have been scheduled at a host city but not yet have a winner.

Country	PTs won, in chronological order		Winning players, in chronological order		PTs hosted, in chronological order	
United States	62	New York 1996, Los Angeles 1996, Paris 1997, Chicago 1997, Mainz 1997, Los Angeles 1998, New York 1998, Seattle 1998, Los Angeles 1999, New York 1999, Washington, D.C. 1999, London 1999, Chicago 1999, Los Angeles 2000, Brussels 2000, New York 2000, Los Angeles 2001, Tokyo 2001, Osaka 2002, Houston 2002, Venice 2003, Boston 2003, Philadelphia 2005, Honolulu 2006, Geneva 2007, San Diego 2007, Kuala Lumpur 2008, Hollywood 2008, Berlin 2008, Austin 2009, Amsterdam 2010, Paris 2011, Nagoya 2011, Honolulu 2012, Montreal 2013, San Diego 2013, Atlanta 2014, Honolulu 2014, Atlanta 2016, Madrid 2016, Nashville 2017, Albuquerque 2017, Richmond 2018, Minneapolis 2018, Atlanta 2018, London 2019, Phoenix 2020, Online 3 2020, Mythic Invitational 2020, 2020 Grand Finals, Strixhaven Championships 2021, Neon Dynasty Championships 2022, Philadelphia 2023, Minneapolis 2023, Arena Championships 3 2023, Barcelona 2023, Chicago 2024, Chicago 2025, Atlanta 2025, Arena Championships 10 2025, Las Vegas 2026, Arena Championships 13 2026,	62	Michael Loconto, Shawn "Hammer" Regnier, Mike Long, Randy Buehler, Matt Place, David Price, Jon Finkel (3), Brian Selden, Steven O'Mahoney-Schwartz, Casey McCarrel, Rob Dougherty, David Humpherys, Darwin Kastle, Kyle Rose, Bob Maher, Jr., Trevor Blackwell, Scott Johns, Michael Turian, Michael Pustilnik, Zvi Mowshowitz, Ken Ho, Justin Gary, Osyp Lebedowicz, William Jensen, Matt Linde, Brock Parker, Gadiel Szleifer, Mark Herberholz, Mike Hron, Chris Lachmann, Jacob Van Lunen, Charles Gindy, Luis Scott-Vargas, Brian Kibler (2), Paul Rietzl, Ben Stark, David Sharfman, Tom Martell, Craig Wescoe, Patrick Chapin, Ari Lax, Jiachen Tao, Steve Rubin, Gerry Thompson, Seth Manfield (3), Wyatt Darby, Allen Wu, Gregory Orange, Andrew Elenbogen, Eli Loveman, Corey Burkhart, William Craddock, Austin Bursavich, Sam Pardee, Eli Kassis, Reid Duke, Nathan Steuer (2), Benjamin Broadstone, Jake Beardsley, Matthew Nass, Michael DeBenedetto-Plummer (2), Gage Fevold	82	New York 1996, Los Angeles 1996, Columbus 1996, Seattle 1996, Atlanta 1996, Dallas 1996, Los Angeles 1997, New York 1997, Seattle 1997, Chicago 1997, Los Angeles 1998, New York 1998, Seattle 1998, Chicago 1998, Los Angeles 1999, New York 1999, Washington, D.C. 1999, Chicago 1999, Los Angeles 2000, New York 2000, New York 2000, Chicago 2000, Los Angeles 2001, New York 2001, New Orleans 2001, San Diego 2002, Boston 2002, Houston 2002, Chicago 2003, Boston 2003, New Orleans 2003, San Diego 2004, Seattle 2004, San Francisco 2004, Columbus 2004, Atlanta 2005, Philadelphia 2005, Los Angeles 2005, Honolulu 2006, Charleston 2006, San Diego 2007, New York 2007, Hollywood 2008, Memphis 2008, Honolulu 2009, Austin 2009, San Diego 2010, Philadelphia 2011, San Francisco 2011, Honolulu 2012, Seattle 2012, San Diego 2013, Atlanta 2014, Portland 2014, Honolulu 2014, Washington DC 2015, Milwaukee 2015, Atlanta 2016, Honolulu 2016, Nashville 2017, Albuquerque 2017, Richmond 2018, Minneapolis 2018, Atlanta 2018, Cleveland 2019, Las Vegas 2019 (Arena), Long Beach 2019 (Arena), Richmond 2019, Long Beach (2nd) 2019 (Arena), Phoenix 2020, Philadelphia 2023, Minneapolis 2023, Chicago 2024, Seattle 2024, Chicago 2025, Las Vegas 2025, Atlanta 2025, Richmond 2026, Las Vegas 2026, Detroit 2027, Minneapolis 2027, Las Vegas 2027
Japan	21	Kobe 2004, Nagoya 2005, Yokohama 2005, Prague 2006, Charleston 2006, Paris 2006, Honolulu 2009, San Francisco 2011, Milwaukee 2015, Honolulu 2016, Nagoya 2020, Online 2 2020, Online 4 2020, Innistrad Championships 2021, Arena Championships 2 2023, Arena Championships 4 2023, Seattle 2024, Arena Championships 7 2024, Las Vegas 2025, Arena Championships 12 2026, Amsterdam 2026	21	Masashiro Kuroda, Shu Komuro, Katsuhiro Mori, Takuya Osawa, Tomohiro Kaji, Tomoharu Saitou, Shouta Yasooka (2), Makihito Mihara, Kazuya Mitamura, Jun'ya Iyanaga, Kazuyuki Takimura, Kenta Harane, Ryuji Murae, Akira Asahara, Yuuki Ichikawa (2), Hiroshi Onizuka, Shinya Saito, Yoshihiko Ikawa, Keisuke Sato, Ken Yukuhiro, Satoshi Nakamura	15	Tokyo 1999, Tokyo 2001, Osaka 2002, Yokohama 2003, Kobe 2004, Nagoya 2005, Yokohama 2005, Kobe 2006, Yokohama 2007, Kyoto 2009, Chiba 2010, Nagoya 2011, Kyoto 2017, Nagoya 2020, Tokyo 2027
Germany	16	Atlanta 1996, Chicago 1998, Tokyo 1999, Chicago 2000, Barcelona 2001, New York 2001, New Orleans 2001, Boston 2002, Chicago 2003, Berlin 2003, Kobe 2006, San Diego 2010, Barcelona 2019, Players Tour Finals 2020, Kaldheim Championships 2021, New Capenna Championships 2022	10	Frank Adler, Dirk Baberowski (3), Kai Budde (7), Marco Blume (2), Daniel Zink, Jan-Moritz Merkel (2), Simon Görtzen, Thoralf Severin, Kristof Prinz, Arne Huschenbeth	3	Mainz 1997, Berlin 2003, Berlin 2008
France	9	San Diego 2002, Columbus 2005, Atlanta 2005, Los Angeles 2005, Yokohama 2007, Valencia 2007, Kyoto 2009, Chiba 2010, Dublin 2013	8	Farid Meraghni, Pierre Canali, Gabriel Nassif (2), Antoine Ruel, Guillaume Wafo-Tapa, Remi Fortier, Guillaume Matignon, Jérémy Dezani	4	Paris 1997, Nice 2002, Paris 2006, Paris 2011
Canada	7	Dallas 1996, New York 1997, New York 2000, Atlanta 2005, Barcelona 2012, Valencia 2014, Minneapolis 2018	7	Paul McCabe, Terry Borer, Gary Wise, Gabriel Tsang, David Rood, Alexander Hayne, Shaun McLaren, Ben Hull	3	Toronto 2001, Montreal 2013, Vancouver 2015
Sweden	6	Columbus 1996, Yokohama 2003, New Orleans 2003, Vancouver 2015, Brussels 2020, Online 1 2020	5	Olle Råde, Mattias Jorstedt, Rickard Osterberg, Joel Larsson (2), Elias Watsfeldt	0	none
Brazil	5	Sydney 2002, San Juan 2010, Dublin 2017, Kyoto 2017, Arena Championships 11 2026	4	Carlos Romão, Paulo Vitor Damo da Rosa (2), Lucas Esper Berthoud, Marcelo Cavalcante	0	none
Norway	4	New York 2000, Nice 2002, Amsterdam 2004, San Diego 2004	3	Sigurd Eskeland, Eivind Nitter, Nicolai Herzog (2)	0	none
Czech Republic	4	Seattle 1997, Seattle 2012, Sydney 2016, Richmond 2019	4	Jakub Slemr, Stanislav Cifka, Lukas Blohon, Ondřej Stráský	1	Prague 2006
Netherlands	4	Toronto 2001, Seattle 2004, San Francisco 2004, Arena Championships 6 2024	6	Tom Van de Logt, Kamiel Cornelissen, Jeroen Remie, Jelger Wiegersma, Julien Nuijten, Wouter Noordzij	4	Amsterdam 2004, Amsterdam 2010, Amsterdam 2024, Amsterdam 2026
United Kingdom	4	Cleveland 2019, Zendikar Rising Championships 2020, Arena Championships 1 2022, Arena Championships 8 2025	4	Autumn Burchett, Brad Barclay, Sam Rolph, Kristoffer Lindqvist	3	London 1999, London 2005, London 2019
Finland	3	Los Angeles 1997, Rome 1998, Memphis 2008	2	Tommi Hovi (2), Antti Malin	0	none
Spain	3	Washington DC 2015, Long Beach 2019 (Arena), Arena Championships 5 2024	3	Antonio Del Moral León, Javier Dominguez, Toni Ramis Pascual	8	Barcelona 2001, Valencia 2007, Barcelona 2012, Valencia 2014, Madrid 2016, Bilbao 2018, Barcelona 2019, Barcelona 2023
Denmark	3	Brussels 2015, Amsterdam 2024, Richmond 2026	3	Martin Dang, Simon Nielsen, Christoffer Larsen	0	none
Argentina	2	Bilbao 2018, Las Vegas 2019 (Arena)	2	Luis Salvatto, Matias Leveratto	0	none
Italy	2	Philadelphia 2011, Arena Championships 9 2025	2	Samuele Estratti, Raffaele Mazza	3	Rome 1998, Venice 2003, Rome 2009
Australia	1	Seattle 1996	1	Tom Chanpheng	2	Sydney 2002, Sydney 2016
Belgium	1	London 2005	1	Geoffrey Siron	3	Brussels 2000, Brussels 2015, Brussels 2020
Israel	1	New York 2007	1	Uri Peleg	0	none
Portugal	1	Rome 2009	1	André Coimbra	0	none
Slovakia	1	Portland 2014	1	Ivan Floch	0	none
Poland	1	Long Beach 2019 (2nd, Arena)	1	Piotr Głogowski	0	none
Malaysia	0	none	0	none	1	Kuala Lumpur 2008
(Republic of Ireland); Ireland	0	none	0	none	2	Dublin 2013, Dublin 2017
Puerto Rico	0	none	0	none	1	San Juan 2010
Switzerland	0	none	0	none	1	Geneva 2007
