= Chris Pikula =

American Magic: The Gathering player

Christopher Pikula
- Nationality: American
- Pro Tour debut: 1996 Pro Tour — New York
- Winnings: US$39,910
- Pro Tour wins (Top 8): 0 (3)
- Grand Prix wins (Top 8): 0 (5)
- Median Pro Tour Finish: 98
- Lifetime Pro Points: 151
- Planeswalker Level: 43 (Battlemage)

Christopher Pikula is an American Magic: The Gathering player. Pikula started playing on the Pro Tour at the very first Pro Tour in New York, 1996. He attended the other two Pro Tour events that season too, failing to attend only the World Championship. Success came at the beginning of the second season, when Pikula reached consecutive Pro Tour Top 8s. In the 1997–98 season he had another Top 8 appearance, this time at the World Championship. Afterwards he reached the Top 8s of two Grand Prix events, but gradually disappeared from the pro scene.

Pikula is best known for leading an anti-cheating drive during the early days of the Magic Pro Tour, when cheating was significantly more prevalent. He was ultimately successful, shifting attitudes in the community from one that largely tolerated cheating to one that is extremely anti-cheating. However, Pikula made a lot of enemies on the way and missed induction into the inaugural Magic Hall of Fame by one vote.

Pikula is also known for creating the Magic card Meddling Mage, his reward for winning the 2000 Magic Invitational. In the 2005 season, he had a small comeback where he reached the Top 8 of another two Grand Prix events. Pikula also made Top 8 in 2017 at GP Orlando.

== Achievements ==
Season	Event type	Location	Format	Date	Rank
1996–97	Pro Tour	Atlanta	Sealed Deck	15–17 September 1996	7
1996–97	Pro Tour	Dallas	Standard	22–24 November 1996	4
1997–98	Worlds	Seattle	Special	12–16 August 1998	6
1998–99	Invitational	Barcelona	Special	4–7 February 1999	3
1998–99	Grand Prix	Kansas City	Extended	27–28 March 1999	2
1998–99	Grand Prix	Washington D.C.	Sealed and Booster Draft	19–20 June 1999	2
1999–00	Invitational	Kuala Lumpur	Special	2–5 March 2000	1
2000–01	Invitational	Sydney	Special	16–19 November 2000	6
2001–02	Invitational	Cape Town	Special	5–7 October 2001	6
2005	Grand Prix	Chicago	Team Limited	18–19 December 2004	3
2005	Grand Prix	Philadelphia	Legacy	12–13 November 2005	2
2016–17	Grand Prix	Orlando	Limited	17–18 March 2017	4

Last updated: 2 February 2010
Source: Wizards.com

Preceded by (United States) Mike Long	Magic Invitational Champion; 1999	Succeeded by (United States) Jon Finkel
