= Mattias Jorstedt =

Swedish Magic: The Gathering player

- Nationality: Swedish
- Winnings: US$71,345
- Pro Tour wins (Top 8): 1 (3)
- Grand Prix wins (Top 8): 0 (2)
- Lifetime Pro Points: 178
- Planeswalker Level: 46 (Archmage)

Mattias Jorstedt is a Swedish former professional Magic: The Gathering player and poker player. He is most famous for winning Pro Tour Yokohama in 2003 and the fact that he during the 2002-2003 season reached three Pro Tour top eights, winning one, and still only finished second in the player of the year-race 16 points behind winner Kai Budde. Around Scandinavia Jorstedt is also famous for winning the first ever Nordic Championship of Magic held in Denmark in the year 2000.

== Achievements ==
Season	Event type	Location	Format	Date	Rank
1996–97	Nationals	Sweden	Standard	1997	2
1996–97	Worlds	Seattle	National team	1997	2
1997–98	Nationals	Sweden	Standard and Booster Draft	1998	3
1998–99	Nationals	Sweden	Standard and Booster Draft	1999	7
1998–99	European Championship	Berlin	Special	1999	5
1999–00	Nationals	Sweden	Standard and Booster Draft	2000	7
2002–03	Grand Prix	Antwerp	Booster Draft	2–3 March 2002	3
2001–02	Nationals	Sweden	Standard and Booster Draft	23–24 May 2002	8
2002–03	Pro Tour	Houston	Extended	8–11 November 2002	8
2002–03	Pro Tour	Yokohama	Booster Draft	9–11 May 2003	1
2002–03	Pro Tour	Venice	Block Constructed	22–23 March 2003	8
2002–03	Grand Prix	Birmingham	Booster Draft	27–28 March 2004	5
2003–04	Invitational	Los Angeles	Special	11–13 May 2004	2

Last updated: 13 october 2014
Source: Wizards.comSvenskamagic.com
