= Tommi Hovi =

Finnish Magic: The Gathering player (born 1980)

- Born: 5 January 1980 (age 46)
- Nationality: (Finland) Finnish
- Winnings: US$103,185
- Pro Tour wins (Top 8): 2 (4)
- Grand Prix wins (Top 8): 0 (1)
- Median Pro Tour Finish: 32
- Lifetime Pro Points: 222
- Highest Constructed Rating: 2176
- Highest Limited Rating: 2150
- Planeswalker Level: 43 (Battlemage)

Tommi Hovi (born 5 January 1980) is a Finnish former professional Magic: The Gathering player. He was inducted into the Magic: The Gathering Pro Tour Hall of Fame in the inaugural class in 2005. Hovi was also the first player to win two Pro Tour championships.

== Deck ==
The deck that took Hovi to his win at Pro Tour Rome was of a type that is now considered the most powerful and "broken" in the game's history: The Academy Deck, named after its key card, Tolarian Academy. The card can be tapped to add 1 blue mana to its controller's mana pool for each artifact under that player's control. Decks of this type rely on large numbers of mana-producing artifacts (like Mox Diamond, Lotus Petal, Grim Monolith, and Thran Dynamo), mechanisms for repeatedly untapping the Academy and/or those artifacts (like Voltaic Key and Mind Over Matter), and ways to get more cards into the player's hand (like Stroke of Genius). Time Spiral was a particularly abusive card in this deck type because it replenishes the player's hand, recycles the graveyard, and untaps the Academy at the same time. The game ends when the Academy player generates enough mana to cast a 60-point (or so) Stroke of Genius on the opponent, resulting in the opponent getting "decked" and thereby losing the game. This deck type was so powerful that almost every card in it was put on the Restricted list, and even then, it continued to survive as "Neo-Academy".

Other notable deck (co-)created by Hovi was the Turbo-Stasis deck, which won him the Finnish Nationals in 1996. This deck got worldwide attention when several top spots at the US Nationals 1996 were playing copies of it.

== Top 8 appearances ==
| Season | Event type | Location | Format | Date | Rank |
|---|---|---|---|---|---|
| 1996 | Nationals | Finland | Standard and Booster Draft | Exact date Unknown | 1 |
| 1996 | Worlds | Seattle | Special | 14–18 August 1996 | 8 |
| 1996–97 | Pro Tour | Los Angeles | Rochester Draft | 28 February–2 March 1997 | 1 |
| 1997–98 | Invitational | Rio de Janeiro | Special | 29 January–2 February 1998 | 7 |
| 1998–99 | Pro Tour | Rome | Extended | 13–15 November 1998 | 1 |
| 1998–99 | European Championship | Berlin | Special | 10–12 July 1999 | 6 |
| 2000–01 | Nationals | Finland | Standard and Booster Draft | 27–28 May 2001 | 5 |
| 2000–01 | Worlds | Toronto | Special | 8–12 August 2001 | 8 |
| 2003–04 | Grand Prix | Göteborg | Rochester Draft | 22–23 November 2003 | 2 |

Last updated: 31 July 2009
Source: Wizards.com

=== Other accomplishments ===
- 2005 Hall of Fame Inductee

Following Hovi's induction into the Pro Tour Hall of Fame, Mark Rosewater said that one of his fondest memories of Hovi was from an ill-fated interview conducted by Rosewater. The highly-talkative Rosewater asked several questions, to which the shy Hovi would only reply with one or two-word answers. Rosewater kept talking, trying to make the questions harder to answer succinctly but the interview ended after about a minute with Rosewater calling it off in a fit of laughter.
