= Mark Justice =

American Magic: The Gathering player

- Born: c. 1970
- Nationality: American
- Pro Tour debut: 1996 Pro Tour – New York
- Winnings: US$58,370
- Pro Tour wins (Top 8): 0 (4)
- Grand Prix wins (Top 8): 0 (0)
- Median Pro Tour Finish: 28.5
- Lifetime Pro Points: 133
- Planeswalker Level: 40 (Sorcerer)
- PTs played: 18

Mark Justice (born c. 1970) is an American former Magic: The Gathering professional player. He was considered by some to be the best player of the game in its earliest era of professional play. Justice was the second Magic: The Gathering United States National Champion in 1995. He also led the first Magic US National Team to the first world team victory of the first team portion of the World Championships.

Justice placed 3rd at the 1995 World Championships, 6th at the first Pro Tour in New York, 1996, 2nd at the 1996 World Championships, and 2nd at PT Paris in 1997. His last appearance was in 1999.

Justice is also an author of the basic and advanced Magic: The Gathering strategy guides.

At Pro Tour Atlanta in 1998, Justice was disqualified from competition for cheating in the limited draft portion of the event. Justice knowingly submitted an incorrect draft list, then proceeded to purchase an additional card from a vendor and attempt to add the card to his deck. The extra card ("Muscle Sliver") was from a different print run and had visibly different color shading from the other three copies he had drafted, and Justice was immediately found out. After lying again about the card, he was given the opportunity to prove his story, that he had purchased a copy to replace the faulty card he drafted and threw away, by producing the copy he had supposedly discarded. Justice refused this opportunity, resulting in his disqualification. This was the most prominent of several incidents of cheating and foul play that have thus far prevented Justice from being admitted to Magic's "Hall of Fame."

== Accomplishments ==
Season	Event type	Location	Format	Date	Rank
None	Nationals	Philadelphia	Special	July 15–16, 1995	1
None	Worlds	Seattle	Special	August 5–7, 1995	3
None	Worlds	Seattle	National team	August 5–7, 1995	1
1996	Pro Tour	New York	Standard	February 16–18, 1996	6
1996	Worlds	Seattle	Special	August 14–18, 1996	2
1996–97	Pro Tour	Paris	Block Constructed	April 11–13, 1997	2
1997–98	Invitational	Rio de Janeiro	Special	January 29 – February 2, 1998	6
1997–98	Pro Tour	New York	Limited	April 17–19, 1998	7

Last updated: December 7, 2008
Source: Wizards.com

Preceded by Bo Bell	Magic US National Champion; 1995	Succeeded by Dennis Bentley
Preceded by N/A	Magic: The Gathering Team World Champion; With: Mike Long; Henry Stern; Peter Leiher; 1995	Succeeded by (United States) United States; Dennis Bentley; George Baxter; Matt Place; Mike Long
