= Eternal (video game) =

2016 video game

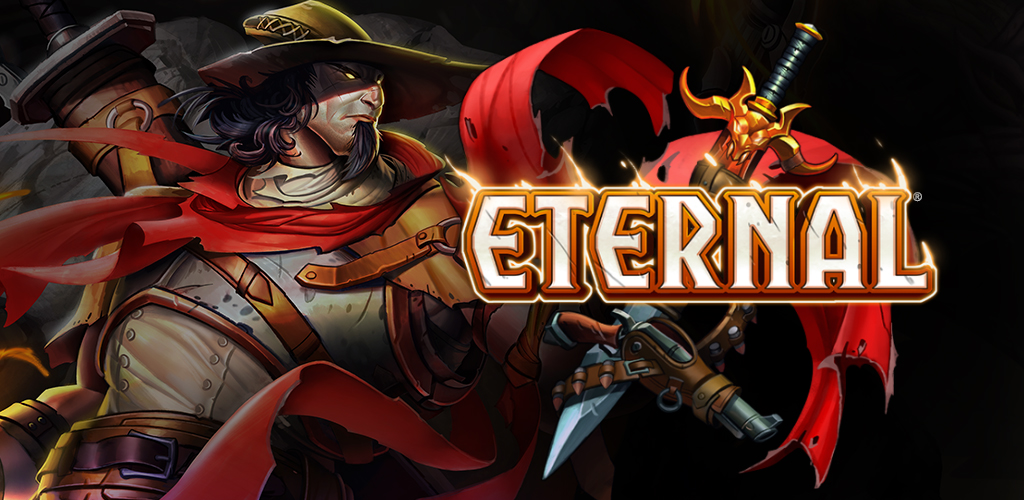
- Eternal Logo and Jekk Character Art
- Developer: Dire Wolf Digital
- Publisher: Dire Wolf Digital
- Platforms: Steam, Android, iOS, Xbox One, Nintendo Switch
- Release: iOS, Android: WW: November 18, 2016; Steam: WW: November 15, 2018; Xbox One: WW: November 21, 2018; Nintendo Switch: WW: October 8, 2019
- Genre: Collectible card game
- Modes: Single-player, multiplayer

Eternal is a free-to-play online collectible card video game developed and published by Dire Wolf Digital. Eternal is available for iOS, Android, Xbox One, PCs using Steam and Nintendo Switch. The game features cross-platform play, allowing players to use any of the supported platforms to compete against each other. The game takes place in a Weird West fantasy setting. The game was in Steam early access in November 2016 and then had its official wide release in November 2018 that included support for the Xbox One. Eternal was released for the Switch on October 8, 2019.

Eternal is a turn-based card game between two opponents that use constructed decks with various numbers of cards. Players use their power cards to cast spells, use attachments or summon units to attack the opponent, with the goal of reducing the opponent's health to zero. Winning matches and completing quests will earn in-game gold, rewards in the form of new cards or packs, and other in-game prizes. Players can buy card packs or access to card drafting modes by using gold or real money microtransactions to collect cards for use in their decks. There are also cosmetic items for purchase. The game features several modes of play, including ranked matches and single-player campaigns. New content for the game involves the addition of new card sets and gameplay, taking the form of either expansion packs or campaigns that reward the player with collectible cards upon completion.

== Gameplay ==
Games of Eternal consist of two opponents (either Player vs. Player, or Player vs. a computer-controlled opponent) using decks of varying numbers of cards containing units, attachments, powers, and spells. The goal is to reduce your opponent's health pool from 25 to zero or run the other player out of cards.

=== Cards ===
There are five types of cards in Eternal:

- Power cards are the resource system for the game. You draw Power cards from your deck and can play one per turn. Decks must consist of between 1/3rd to 2/3rds of only Power cards.
- Unit cards represent characters and creatures from the game's world. Once summoned, unit cards each have an attack and a health value; when a unit attacks a player, it will deal its attack value to that player's health, and if it is blocked by another unit, it will deal damage based on its attack value and take damage based on the defending unit's attack value. A unit's health regenerates at the start of the next turn. Units normally cannot attack the turn they are put into play, and once in play, they can normally attack once per turn.
- Attachment cards are played either on a Unit (in the case of Weapons and Curses) or on a player avatar (for Relics, Relic Weapons, and Cursed Relics).
- Spell cards have an immediate effect when played and then are discarded. "Fast Spells" can be played mid-combat or during your opponent's turn.
- Sites represent locations in the game. Like Units, they remain in play until killed, but take up two spots on the gameboard. Each site has an Agenda (which plays a spell each turn for 3 turns), a static effect, and a Hero, which is played the turn after the Agenda is completed.

Eternal allows players to destroy unwanted cards or any cards collected beyond the maximum of four allowed in a deck into shiftstone that can then be used to create new cards of the player's choosing. Shiftstone is also acquired after opening each card pack, from completing certain achievements or from faction rank up rewards.

=== Factions ===
All cards in Eternal are divided into five "Factions", along with a sixth "Factionless" category. The five Factions are:

- Fire (red) is the faction of creation and destruction; most problems can be handled with quick and violent solutions.
- Justice (green) is the faction of order, both in civic harmony and brutal tyranny.
- Primal (blue) is the faction of nature in both its savage fury and pristine beauty.
- Shadow (purple) is the faction of ambition and instinct; hidden paths lead to dangerous secrets.
- Time (yellow) is the faction of learning and discovery; knowledge is the key to power.

In addition, the Factions can be combined into a set of ten pairs named after locations in the gameworld:

| | Fire | Justice | Primal | Shadow | Time |
|---|---|---|---|---|---|
| Fire | - | Rakano | Skycrag | Stonescar | Praxis |
| Justice | Rakano | - | Hooru | Argenport | Combrei |
| Primal | Skycrag | Hooru | - | Feln | Elysian |
| Shadow | Stonescar | Argenport | Feln | - | Xenan |
| Time | Praxis | Combrei | Elysian | Xenan | - |

The first five tri-color faction names were released in the Defiance set: Auralian for Time/Primal/Shadow, Ixtun for Fire/Justice/Primal, Jennev for Fire/Time/Primal, Kerendon for Justice/Time/Shadow, and Winchest for Fire/Justice/Shadow. Alternate names for tri-color factions are: Creation for FTJ, Instinct for FTP, Destruction for FTS, Honor for FJP, Ambition FJS, Menace for FPS, Tradition for TJP, Vision for TJS, Knowledge for TPS, Purpose for JPS.

=== Set releases/campaigns ===
The Empty Throne is the free base campaign that serves as a tutorial to introduce new players to the game that was released on November 19, 2016. Players use preconstructed decks from each faction to play through five stories consisting of four games each. Each match won awards new cards that are added to the player's deck. Upon completing each story, players keep all the cards that were used. Playing through all five stories to complete the base campaign awards five starting decks.

The Empty Throne is also the name for the first full set that was released on November 19, 2016, that features 413 cards. Each full set release has its own card pack associated with it that only contains cards from that set.

Jekk's Bounty is the first mini-set and additional campaign that was released on February 16, 2017. The campaign includes 16 cards and each added campaign will cost either in-game gold or gems. Players take on the role of an apprentice to Jekk, the Bounty Hunter, who guides them on a series of 16 single-player missions. Each mission is played with a constructed deck of the player's creation and may use special rules that alter each mission. Completing each mission awards the player with four copies of the cards that can only be acquired by completing missions; each campaign works in a similar way.

Omens of the Past is the second full set that was released on July 14, 2017. The set features 252 cards, new faction pairs and new mechanics such as Spark that adds an additional effect if the opponent has been damaged this turn, Revenge that allows a dead minion to be shuffled into a player's deck and if drawn is put into play and Warp that allows the top card of the deck to played as if it was in the player's hand.

The Tale of Horus Traver is the second mini-set and campaign that was released on September 22, 2017. The campaign includes 23 cards and 16 single-player missions. Players take on the role of homesteader Horus Traver, as he is guided towards his destiny as a Stranger by Azindel. Each mission is played with a constructed deck and uses special rules that alter gameplay. Completing each mission awards the player with four copies of the cards that can only be acquired by completing The Tale of Horus Traver missions.

The Dusk Road is the third full set that was released on December 18, 2017. The set features 280 cards, new mechanics such as Nightfall that swaps between day and night, new avatars, and expands upon the lore of the land of Myria via the card art.

Dead Reckoning is the third mini-set and campaign that was released on March 7, 2018. It includes 25 cards and 18 missions. It tells the story of Valkyrie Captain Icaria's rebellion against Lord Commander Rolant, so its story begins in the past before the events of The Empty Throne campaign and then continues until Rolant is ultimately killed. Completing each mission awards the player with four copies of the cards that can only be acquired by completing Dead Reckoning missions.

The Fall of Argenport is the fourth full set that was released on June 28, 2018. The set features 279 cards and new mechanics like Inspire that does something when you draw a minion, Spellcraft, that lets you do an additional effect if you spend more power, Berserk that lets minions attack twice and adds merchants that only swap a card in hand with one from the market, which is similar to a sideboard.

Into Shadow is the fourth mini-set and campaign that was released on September 19, 2018. It includes 23 cards and 17 missions. It follows Vara in her pursuit of Azindel, who stole her memories, and the discovery that Caiphus, her father, is still alive.

Defiance is the fifth full set that was released on December 13, 2018. It includes 256 cards. It adds greater support for three-faction decks, and introduces several new mechanics such as a new card type, Sites, which are played like units and does something when played and at the start of each turn and new abilities like Amplify that is playing an additional power cost to do something extra, Black Market that is a market but the cards cannot be the same as ones in a player's deck, Renown and Pledge.

Homecoming is the fifth mini-set and campaign that was released on March 28, 2019. It includes 26 cards and 18 missions. The missions, for the first time, only allow preconstructed decks to be used to complete the missions. The story follows Svetya as she leads the remains of her royal guard along with Milos and his rebels to take back her homeland, Kosul, from Yushkov.

Dark Frontier is the sixth full set that was released on May 9, 2019. It includes 252 cards and adds greater support for single-faction decks. The set introduces several new mechanics such as a new card ability, Twist, that when activated on units gives them +1/-1 does something extra depending on the card, Onslaught and Shift; Warp, introduced in Omens, is featured on many of the set's cards.

The Trials of Grodov is the sixth mini-set that was released on July 24, 2019. It includes 20 cards and is the first mini-set not to have a campaign associated with it. The mini-set also includes the early release of the last five dual-faction insignias; these power cards were later included in The Flame of Xulta set.

The Flame of Xulta is the seventh full set that was released on October 7, 2019. It includes 234 cards and it introduces several new mechanics such as Mastery that rewards a player for having units and/or weapons that stay active long enough to deal a certain amount of damage, Decimate that allows a player to destroy one power in order to gain something extra and cards that can be played directly from the card graveyard or the market.

Promises by Firelight is the seventh mini-set and sixth campaign that was released on December 19, 2019. It includes 21 cards that can be played in all versus game modes and it has 21 missions. The missions only allow preconstructed decks to be used.

Echoes of Eternity is the eighth full set that was released on February 12, 2020. It includes 231 cards and introduces the Corrupted mechanics, where if a corrupted unit dies it leaves behind a shade and reuses many mechanics that were introduced in other sets.

Whispers of the Throne is the eighth mini-set that was released on March 30, 2020. It includes 21 cards and is the second mini-set not to have a campaign associated with it.

Shadow of the Spire is the ninth mini-set that was released on May 4, 2020. It includes 23 cards and is the third mini-set not to have a campaign associated with it.

Argent Depths is the ninth full set that was released on Jun 24, 2020. It includes 226 cards and introduces the new mechanics such as surge, decay, imbue and plunder.

Awakening is the 10th mini-set and seventh campaign that was released on September 1, 2020. It includes 21 cards and it has 17 missions.

Bastion Rising is the 11th mini-set that was released on November 4, 2020. It includes 23 cards.

Empire of Glass is the 10th full set that was released on December 14, 2020. It includes 220 cards and introduces new mechanics such as regen.

Buried Memories is the 12th mini-set that was released on February 11, 2021. It includes 22 cards.

Revelations is the 11th full set that was released on May 18, 2021. It includes over 220 cards and introduces new mechanics such as stealth and valor.

Hour of Glass is the 13th mini-set and eighth campaign that was released on July 21, 2021. It includes 21 cards.

Cold Hunt is the 12th full set that was released on November 11, 2021. It includes over 210 cards and introduces new mechanics such as inscribe that allows a non-power card to be used as power and the hero tag for unique named characters; at the same time as this set was released every account gets access to over 150 cards (from past sets) for free; these cards can be used in the various ranked formats.

Valley Beyond is the 14th mini-set that was released on February 3, 2022. It includes 24 cards with a dinosaur theme.

Unleashed is the 13th full set that was released on May 12, 2022. It includes 210 new cards and also includes 90 cards that are reprints of past sets; this set introduces new mechanics such as unleash which allows a player to replay that card the turn it was played and Frenzy gives a bonus every time a player hits the enemy player with anything except an attacking unit.

Enter The Arcanum is the 15th mini-set that was released on August 17, 2022. It includes 24 cards.

=== Throne, Casual and Expedition ===
Throne, Casual and Expedition are PvP modes, where players use constructed 75-card decks using the cards in their collection. All of these modes are free to enter and players earn rewards based on overall performance. Throne mode (previously called Ranked) is a monthly leaderboard ladder divided into five brackets through which players climb: Bronze, Silver, Gold, Diamond and Master, gaining rating points with every win and losing points with each loss. Each win earns rewards in the form of cards and in-game gold which can be used to enter other game modes or acquire card packs. Casual is similar to Ranked mode except it does not have a ladder. Expedition is also similar to ranked except the card pool is more limited; only cards from The Empty Throne, Defiance, Dark Frontier, and Trials of Grodov sets are allowed to be used.

=== Draft, Forge and Gauntlet ===
In the Draft (PvP) and Forge (PvE) modes, players build a new deck from a limited pool of cards presented to them. Both modes require in-game gold or gems (from microtransactions with real money) to enter. Players keep all of the cards they selected, along with additional rewards for winning games. Draft mode consists of a pool of 48 cards selected from four packs of 12 cards each, plus any number of sigil power cards, arranged into a 45-card deck by the player. Forge mode requires players to select 25 cards, one at a time, from sets of three cards; these cards will come from the first two factions selected by the player. Power cards are added automatically after all cards are selected. After a deck is constructed, these two modes are played until a player wins seven times or has either has three losses in Draft or two losses in Forge, alternately, a player may retire a run at any time.

Gauntlet is the mode where a player uses a deck against a series of PvE opponents in which players attempt to win seven games, culminating in a "Boss" game with a special game rule for an additional challenge. Rewards increase with the number of games won and are earned by players either when they defeat the final Boss or when the player is eliminated by one or two losses, depending on the current Gauntlet ranking.

=== Puzzles ===
Eternal features many puzzles that focus on different game mechanics such as Deadly (kill any unit damaged) and Aegis (negates one effect from the player's opponent). These puzzles can help players learn the mechanics of the cards. These single-player challenges award gold when completed the first time.

=== Events ===
Since transitioning from closed to open beta, Eternal has hosted in-game limited time PvP events with their own unique twists. Some of the events were the "Shadow Eclipse Event" on August 21, 2017 that made players draw an extra card each turn and "The Dusk Road Preview Event" on December 14, 2017 that allowed players to play with cards from The Dusk Road set before it was released.

Beginning in April 2018, Eternal has hosted a monthly sealed deck league. This event requires players to build a deck of 45 cards while only using cards collected from packs earned from the event that begins with eight packs and ends with 14 packs; between matches, players may modify their deck. After the monthly event is over, players are rewarded with a number of card packs and a random premium card based on their leaderboard results, and all participants are given an exclusive card back.

The first Eternal World Championship was held on July 13–14, 2019. The sixteen top players shared a prize pool of $100,000. Eternal has monthly tournament events that have cash prizes and will culminate in a $100,000 World Championship in early 2020.

=== Rewards ===
Rewards in Eternal take the form of individual cards, gold and packs. Rewards come in treasure chests of varying rarity: Bronze, Silver, Gold and Diamond. Each chest has a small chance to upgrade to the next-highest rarity chest. Rewards are earned after every ranked, casual and expedition mode win, and upon completion of daily quests, drafts, events, forges and gauntlets. Additionally, rewards at the end of each monthly chapter are determined by a player's final rankings in both ranked and draft modes as well as in the sealed deck league.

Since the game's inception, various promo cards have been offered for a limited time as free in-game rewards to players that win one match and these cards may be created with shiftstone after the promotion period is over. In addition, watching Twitch streamers playing Eternal can reward drops that include cards, packs and draft mode tickets.

== Development ==
Eternal was announced in January 2016 at PAX South, and began a closed beta that April. On November 18, 2016, closed beta accounts were wiped and open beta began; closed beta players received a number of free card packs determined by the size of their closed beta card collection. Since that date, the game was still considered to be in "Early Access" on Steam until November 2018.

The game was developed at Dire Wolf Digital by a team that has included Magic: The Gathering Hall of Fame players Luis Scott-Vargas and Patrick Chapin as well as other Magic: The Gathering professional players including Conley Woods, Andrew Baeckstrom, Patrick Sullivan and Josh Utter-Leyton.

In June 2017, the iPad client was ready for regional release in Australia and Canada. A short time later the iPad client was released worldwide.

== Story ==
=== The Eternal Throne ===
Eternal is the story of the struggle for the Eternal Throne of Myria when it is left vacant by the disappearance of King Caiphus. The Throne itself has magical properties, as depicted in the epilogue to the Empty Throne campaign, but the scope and nature of its abilities are currently unclear.

=== Scions ===
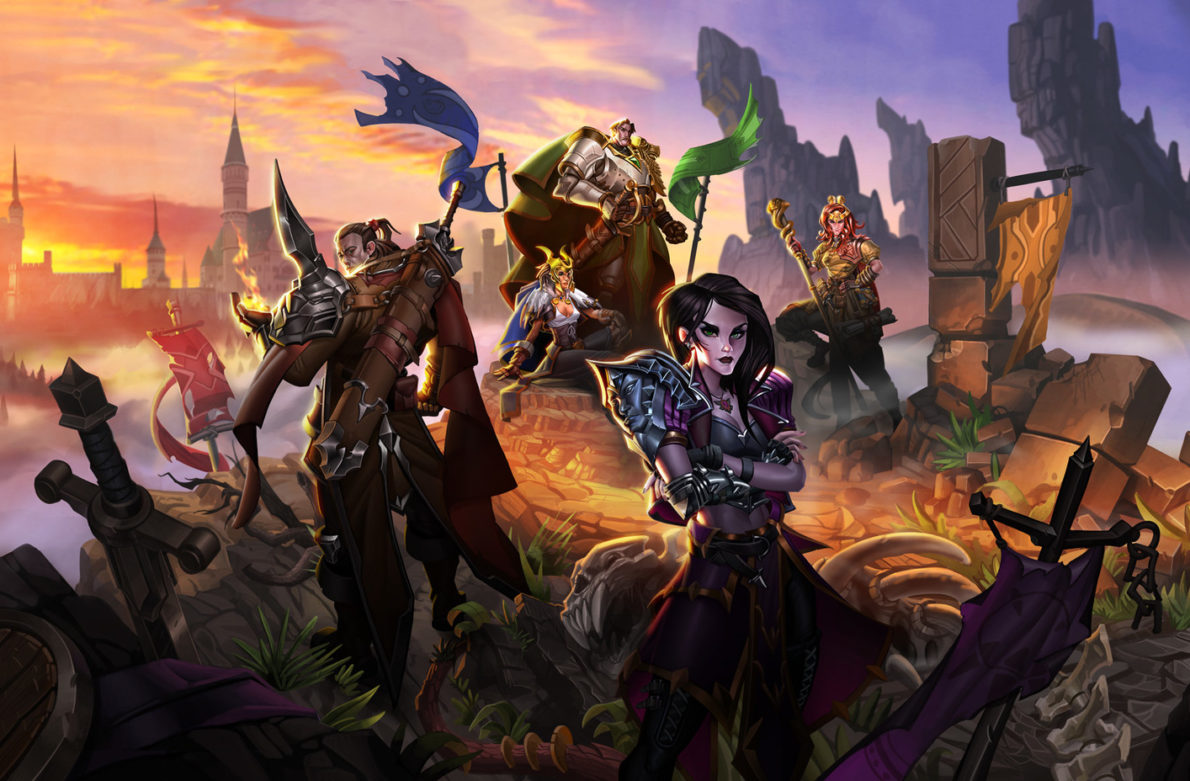
The Scions from left to right: Kaleb, Eilyn, Rolant, Vara and Talir

King Caiphus is gone; those with the strongest claim to the vacant Eternal Throne are the five "Scions" in Eternal - powerful characters who could claim the Eternal Throne while having their own agendas to pursue.

- Rolant is the Commander of the Crownwatch, the acting Regent of Argenport in the absence of an official ruler and Caiphus' uncle. He attempts to maintain order using his army, which starts a civil war within the city.
- Eilyn is a powerful shaman of the barbarian tribes that nearly destroyed Argenport before a truce was reached that culminated with her marriage to King Caiphus.
- Kaleb is a headstrong warrior with little interest in politics, whose status as Caiphus' illegitimate son weakens his claim to the throne. He is rumored to be a clone of Caiphus.
- Vara is the favored heir to the Eternal Throne as Caiphus' daughter, but has grown tired of being a political pawn of others and instead explores the Shadowlands for her own ends.
- Talir is among the most gifted magic users in Myria. She is Caiphus' sister and the Arch Magister of the Praxis Arcanum.

=== Other characters ===
- Caiphus is the former occupant of the Eternal Throne. Each of the Scions is defined by their relationship to him.
- Jekk, the Bounty Hunter is the protagonist and narrator of the opening cinematic, as well as the Jekk's Bounty campaign.
- Icaria was the first Valkyrie and their Captain but turned against Rolant to lead a rebellion against his rule.
- Azindel tricked Caiphus into breaking the seal of the Eternal Throne. Azindel has guided Vara through the Shadowlands and gave her a magical amulet that erased her memories.
- The Strangers are an army of men whose faces are marked with a glowing purple symbol created by Azindel.
- Horus Traver is a simple homesteader who gets caught up in the struggle for the Eternal Throne.
- Eremot is an entity has led Vara to again use the Eternal Throne.

== Reception ==
Since its release, Eternal has enjoyed positive reviews by players and media alike. Dire Wolf Digital has also promoted the game at numerous conventions including 2016 Pax South, 2016 Gen Con, 2017 Pax East, and 2017 Pax West. PC Gamer praised the use of 'instant' cards that can be played during your opponent's turn while making things streamlined and quick; the reviewer says the game had his favorite draft mode in digital gaming that creates a deck from four card packs that the player keeps after the mode is finished.
