= List of Friday Night Magic cards =

Promotional Magic: The Gathering Cards

This is a list of promotional Magic: The Gathering cards given out at Friday Night Magic tournaments since 2000. They are commonly referred to as FNM cards.

Before 2015, cards were awarded to the winner, the most sporting player (replaced by the finalist in 2005), and two other players chosen at random. Since 2015, distribution is left to the event organizer's discretion, although the Wizards Play Network provides guidelines to ensure every player has a chance to obtain the promotional card. From October 2017 to April 2018, promo cards were replaced with promo "Double Sided Tokens". However, after feedback to the change, Wizards of the Coast returned to promo cards. Starting in 2019, with the Core Set 2020, promo cards were replaced with packs of random promo cards.

== 2000 ==
- 2/00: River Boa
- 3/00: Terror
- 4/00: Longbow Archer
- 5/00: Volcanic Geyser
- 6/00: Mind Warp
- 7/00: Shock
- 8/00: Giant Growth *First Card with the DCI Logo.*
- 9/00: Prodigal Sorcerer
- 10/00: Stone Rain
- 11/00: Llanowar Elves
- 12/00: Staunch Defenders

== 2001 ==
- 6/01: Swords to Plowshares
- 7/01: Ophidian
- 8/01: Jackal Pup
- 9/01: Quirion Ranger
- 10/01: Carnophage
- 11/01: Impulse
- 12/01: Fireblast

== 2002 ==
- 1/02: Soltari Priest
- 2/02: Albino Troll
- 3/02: Dissipate
- 4/02: Black Knight
- 5/02: Wall of Blossoms
- 6/02: Fireslinger
- 7/02: Drain Life
- 8/02: Aura of Silence
- 9/02: Forbid
- 10/02: Spike Feeder
- 11/02: Mogg Fanatic
- 12/02: White Knight

== 2003 ==
Disenchant was the last FNM card to use the old frame and the classic Shooting Star foil look. Beginning with Smother FNM cards used the frame introduced with 8th Edition and featured the FNM logo on top of the text box. While Crystalline Sliver is numbered 3/12 F03 it was not distributed as an FNM promo. Some of the cards were stolen and Wizards chose not to distribute the Slivers instead shifting FNM prize card schedule by one month, thus Capsize was handed out in March. Disenchant was added to the series of 2003 FNM cards and handed out in July, thus shifting the remaining cards for the year back into the original schedule. In contrast to the other FNM cards the FNM Disenchant is not numbered. Most of the lost Crystalline Slivers were later recovered and handed out at the 2008 summer Grand Prix events.

- 1/03: Bottle Gnomes
- 2/03: Muscle Sliver
- 3/03: Crystalline Sliver
- 4/03: Capsize
- 5/03: Priest of Titania
- 6/03: Goblin Bombardment
- 7/03: Scragnoth
- 7/03: Disenchant
- 8/03: Smother
- 9/03: Whipcorder
- 10/03: Sparksmith
- 11/03: Krosan Tusker
- 12/03: Withered Wretch

== 2004 ==
- 1/04: Willbender
- 2/04: Slice and Dice
- 3/04: Silver Knight
- 4/04: Krosan Warchief
- 5/04: Lightning Rift
- 6/04: Carrion Feeder
- 7/04: Treetop Village
- 8/04: Accumulated Knowledge
- 9/04: Avalanche Riders
- 10/04: Reanimate
- 11/04: Mother of Runes
- 12/04: Brainstorm

== 2005 ==
- 1/05: Rancor
- 2/05: Seal of Cleansing
- 3/05: Flametongue Kavu
- 4/05: Blastoderm
- 5/05: Cabal Therapy
- 6/05: Fact or Fiction
- 7/05: Juggernaut
- 8/05: Circle of Protection: Red
- 9/05: Kird Ape
- 10/05: Duress
- 11/05: Counterspell
- 12/05: Icy Manipulator

== 2006 ==
- 1/06: Elves of Deep Shadow
- 2/06: Armadillo Cloak
- 3/06: Terminate
- 4/06: Lobotomy
- 5/06: Goblin Warchief
- 6/06: Wild Mongrel
- 7/06: Chainer's Edict
- 8/06: Circular Logic
- 9/06: Astral Slide
- 10/06: Arrogant Wurm
- 11/06: Life / Death
- 12/06: Fire / Ice

== 2007 ==
- 1/07: Firebolt
- 2/07: Deep Analysis
- 3/07: Gerrard's Verdict
- 4/07: Basking Rootwalla
- 5/07: Wonder
- 6/07: Goblin Legionnaire
- 7/07: Engineered Plague
- 8/07: Goblin Ringleader
- 9/07: Wing Shards
- 10/07: Cabal Coffers
- 11/07: Roar of the Wurm
- 12/07: Force Spike

== 2008 ==
Beginning with Remand the FNM promo cards have new alternate artworks.

- 1/08: Remand
- 2/08: Tormod's Crypt
- 3/08: Eternal Witness
- 4/08: Tendrils of Agony
- 5/08: Pendelhaven
- 6/08: Resurrection
- 7/08: Wall of Roots
- 8/08: Desert
- 9/08: Thirst for Knowledge
- 10/08: Serrated Arrows
- 11/08: Isochron Scepter
- 12/08: Shrapnel Blast

== 2009 ==
- 1/09: Magma Jet
- 2/09: Myr Enforcer
- 3/09: Kitchen Finks
- 4/09: Merrow Reejerey
- 5/09: Wren's Run Vanquisher
- 6/09: Mulldrifter
- 7/09: Murderous Redcap
- 8/09: Lightning Greaves
- 9/09: Watchwolf
- 10/09: Browbeat
- 11/09: Oblivion Ring
- 12/09: Sakura-Tribe Elder

== 2010 ==
Beginning with Rift Bolt the FNM promo cards have the shooting star expansion symbol.

- 1/10: Tidehollow Sculler
- 2/10: Ghostly Prison
- 3/10: Ancient Ziggurat
- 4/10: Bloodbraid Elf
- 5/10: Cloudpost
- 6/10: Elvish Visionary
- 7/10: Anathemancer
- 8/10: Krosan Grip
- 9/10: Qasali Pridemage
- 10/10: Rift Bolt
- 11/10: Gatekeeper of Malakir
- 12/10: Wild Nacatl

== 2011 ==
Beginning in April, the FNM watermark was replaced with the shooting star symbol. In addition, Artisan of Kozilek, Squadron Hawk, and Rhox War Monk have a "Friday Night Magic" logo in the bottom right of the image of the card.

- 1/11: Everflowing Chalice
- 2/11: Spellstutter Sprite
- 3/11: Wall of Omens
- 4/11: Artisan of Kozilek
- 5/11: Squadron Hawk
- 6/11: Rhox War Monk
- 7/11: Jace's Ingenuity
- 8/11: Cultivate
- 9/11: Teetering Peaks
- 10/11: Contagion Clasp
- 11/11: Go for the Throat
- 12/11: Savage Lands

== 2012 ==
- 1/12: Glistener Elf
- 2/12: Despise
- 3/12: Tectonic Edge
- 4/12: Dismember
- 4/6/12: Human/Wolf transforming token / (FNM full moon promo)
- 5/12: Ancient Grudge
- 6/12: Acidic Slime
- 7/12: Forbidden Alchemy
- 8/12: Avacyn's Pilgrim
- 9/12: Lingering Souls
- 10/12: Evolving Wilds
- 11/12: Pillar of Flame
- 12/12: Gitaxian Probe

== 2013 ==
Since 2013, for cards that are having other watermark in their original printed version, the FNM watermark was replaced with the watermark in their original printing.

- 1/13: Searing Spear
- 2/13: Reliquary Tower
- 3/13: Farseek
- 4/13: Call of the Conclave
- 5/13: Judge's Familiar
- 6/13: Izzet Charm
- 7/13: Rakdos Cackler
- 8/13: Dimir Charm
- 9/13: Experiment One
- 10/13: Ghor-Clan Rampager
- 11/13: Grisly Salvage
- 12/13: Sin Collector

== 2014 ==
- 1/14: Warleader's Helix
- 2/14: Elvish Mystic
- 3/14: Banisher Priest
- 4/14: Encroaching Wastes
- 5/14: Tormented Hero
- 6/14: Dissolve
- 7/14: Magma Spray *First card to use the M15 card frames and holofoil stamp*
- 8/14: Bile Blight
- 9/14: Banishing Light
- 10/14: Fanatic of Xenagos
- 11/14: Brain Maggot
- 12/14: Stoke the Flames

== 2015 ==
- 1/15: Frenzied Goblin
- 2/15: Disdainful Stroke
- 3/15: Hordeling Outburst
- 4/15: Suspension Field
- 5/15: Abzan Beastmaster
- 6/15: Frost Walker
- 7/15: Path to Exile
- 8/15: Serum Visions
- 9/15: Orator of Ojutai
- 10/15: Ultimate Price
- 11/15: Roast
- 12/15: Anticipate

== 2016 ==
- 1/16: Nissa's Pilgrimage
- 2/16: Clash of Wills
- 3/16: Smash to Smithereens
- 4/16: Blighted Fen
- 5/16: Goblin Warchief
- 6/16: Sylvan Scrying
- 7/16: Spatial Contortion
- 8/16: Crumbling Vestige
- 9/16: Flaying Tendrils
- 10/16: Rise from the Tides
- 11/16: Fiery Temper
- 12/16: Call the Bloodline

== 2017 ==
Beginning in October, the promos were changed to be double-sided tokens rather than cards from recent sets.

- 1/17: Noose Constrictor
- 2/17: Fortune's Favour
- 3/17: Incendiary Flow
- 4/17: Servo Exhibition
- 5/17: Unlicensed Disintegration
- 6/17: Aether Hub
- 7/17: Reverse Engineer
- 8/17: Renegade Rallier
- 9/17: Fatal Push
- 10-12/17: Double-sided token of either Vampire/Treasure, Dinosaur/Treasure, or Pirate/Treasure ---

== 2018 ==
Beginning in April, the prize was reverted from double-sided tokens to standard promos, as community feedback did not match to WotC's expectations after the change. At the same time, instead of each promo being tied to a month, three promos were made available during the whole run of a given set, for stores to distribute as they see fit.

- 1-3/18: Double-sided token of either Illusion/Saproling, City's Blessing/Elemental, or Merfolk/Treasure
- Dominaria: Opt, Cast Down, Shanna, Sisay's Legacy
- Core Set 2019: Elvish Rejuvenator, Militia Bugler, Murder
- Guilds of Ravnica: Conclave Tribunal, Sinister Sabotage, Thought Erasure

== 2019 ==
Beginning with the release of Core Set 2020, the way promos were distributed was again changed. Instead of explicitly tying promos to specific events like FNM, instead stores would be given "promo packs" to be distributed as they see fit. The packs contains promo stamped cards from the set, as well as a small number of specific cards using the dark frame from previous FNM promos.

- Ravnica Allegiance: Growth Spiral, Light Up the Stage, Mortify
- War of the Spark: Augur of Bolas, Paradise Druid, Dovin's Veto
- Core Set 2020: Corpse Knight, Negate, Disfigure, Flame Sweep, Thrashing Brontodon
- Throne of Eldraine: Glass Casket, Improbable Alliance, Inspiring Veteran, Kenrith's Transformation, Slaying fire
