= Darwin Kastle =

American player of Magic: The Gathering

- Nickname: Big D
- Born: 26 July 1971 (age 55)
- Nationality: American
- Pro Tour debut: 1996 Pro Tour New York
- Winnings: US$ 148,897
- Pro Tour wins (Top 8): 1 (8)
- Grand Prix wins (Top 8): 2 (11)
- Lifetime Pro Points: 351
- Planeswalker Level: 48 (Archmage)

Darwin Kastle Mess (born 26 July 1971), also simply known as Darwin Kastle, is a champion Magic: The Gathering player from the United States of America, and was a member of the inaugural class elected to the Magic: The Gathering Pro Tour Hall of Fame in 2005. Kastle also ranks 12th on the all time Pro Tour earnings list. Kastle's likeness is depicted on the card Avalanche Riders, which he also designed after winning the second Magic Invitational.

Additionally, Darwin Kastle is a game designer and the Creative Director for White Wizard Games. Their deck-building game, Star Realms has won numerous awards, including the 2015 SXSW Tabletop Game of the Year Award, four Golden Geek Awards for Best 2-Player Game, Best Card Game, Best Indie Game and Best Handheld Game, two Dice Tower Awards for Best Two-Player Game and Best Small Publisher, and Best Card Game: Fan Favorite at Origins 2015. He has designed Star Realms, Hero Realms, The Battle for Hill 218, The Battle for Sector 219, and Space Station Assault. He has also worked on Epic Card Game, the VS Trading Card game, Battleground Fantasy Warfare, EpicTCG, and Ascension: Chronicle of the Godslayer.

== Top 8 appearances ==
Season	Event type	Location	Format	Date	Rank
1996	Pro Tour	Los Angeles	Booster Draft	3–5 May 1996	3
1996–97	Pro Tour	Atlanta	Sealed Deck	13–15 September 1996	2
1996–97	Pro Tour	Paris	Block Constructed	11–13 April 1997	3
1997–98	Invitational	Rio de Janeiro	Special	29 January – 2 February 1998	1
1997–98	Grand Prix	Indianapolis	Limited	27–28 June 1998	6
1998–99	Grand Prix	Boston	Standard	5–6 September 1998	5
1998–99	Grand Prix	Austin	Standard	10–11 October 1998	2
1998–99	Invitational	Barcelona	Special	4–7 February 1999	5
1999–00	Pro Tour	Washington, D.C.	Team Limited	3–5 September 1999	1
1999–00	Pro Tour	London	Booster Draft	15–17 October 1999	8
1999–00	Grand Prix	San Diego	Limited	20–21 November 1999	5
2000–01	Grand Prix	Manchester	Limited	7–8 October 2000	1
2000–01	Invitational	Sydney	Special	16–19 November 2000	5
2001–02	Grand Prix	Denver	Block Constructed	18–19 August 2001	3
2001–02	Pro Tour	New Orleans	Extended	2–4 November 2001	7
2002–03	Pro Tour	Houston	Extended	8–10 November 2002	3
2002–03	Pro Tour	Venice	Block Constructed	21–23 March 2003	6

Last updated: 12 August 2009
Source: Wizards.com

=== Other accomplishments ===
- 2005 Hall of Fame inductee.
- Last player to have played all Pro Tours after 48 appearances from 1996 PT New York to 2004 PT Kobe.

Preceded by (Sweden) Olle Råde	Magic Invitational Champion; 1997	Succeeded by (United States) Mike Long
