= Olle Råde =

Swedish Magic: The Gathering player

- Born: 11 December 1978 (age 47)
- Nationality: (Sweden) Swedish
- Pro Tour debut: 1996 Pro Tour Columbus
- Winnings: US$68,490
- Pro Tour wins (Top 8): 1 (5)
- Grand Prix wins (Top 8): 1 (1)
- Median Pro Tour Finish: 32
- Lifetime Pro Points: 192
- Planeswalker Level: 46 (Archmage)

Olle Råde (born 11 December 1978) is a professional Magic: The Gathering player from Sweden. He was inducted to the Magic: The Gathering Pro Tour Hall of Fame as part of the inaugural class in 2005. Olle was also the first player awarded with the coveted Player of the Year award and was the first non-American player to win a pro tour event. He was also the youngest pro tour event winner at the time (at only 17 years old at the time of his win.) He appears in the artwork of Sylvan Safekeeper, which he designed after winning the first Magic Invitational. In April 2015 a poll was conducted by www.svenskamagic.com, the official Magic the Gathering-page of Sweden. There Olle was voted best Swedish magic player of all time, with 37.3% of the votes. In May 2016 Olle won the Swedish Open Championship of Magic the Gathering, playing his trademark deck white weenie with a red splash.

== Accomplishments ==
Olle Råde, at age 17, was the earnings leader in 1996, making $38,350.

Season	Event type	Location	Format	Date	Rank
1996	Pro Tour	Columbus, Ohio	Block Constructed	6–7 July 1996	1
1996	Worlds	Seattle	Standard	14–18 August 1996	4
1996–97	Pro Tour	Dallas	Standard	22–24 November 1996	6
1996–97	Invitational	Hong Kong	Standard	14–16 February 1997	1
1997–98	Pro Tour	Chicago	Extended	10–12 October 1997	8
1997–98	Grand Prix	Stockholm	Limited	21–22 March 1998	1
1998–99	Pro Tour	Rome	Extended	13–15 November 1998	5
1998–99	Nationals	Sweden	Standard and Booster Draft	23–24 May 1999	8

Last updated: 8 September 2014
Source: Wizards.com

Preceded by n/a	Pro Player of the Year; 1996	Succeeded by (Canada) Paul McCabe
Preceded by n/a	Magic Invitational Champion; 1996	Succeeded by (United States) Darwin Kastle
