= Paul McCabe (Magic: The Gathering player) =

Canadian Magic: The Gathering player

- Nationality: (Canada) Canadian
- Pro Tour debut: 1996 Worlds Seattle
- Winnings: $43,750
- Pro Tour wins (Top 8): 1 (2)
- Grand Prix wins (Top 8): 0 (0)
- Lifetime Pro Points: 75
- Planeswalker Level: 38 (Sorcerer)

Paul McCabe is a Canadian Magic: The Gathering player. He is known for his success in the 1996-97 Pro Tour season. During this season, McCabe reached the top eight of two Pro Tours, and won the Player of the Year title. He has had no significant finishes in Professional Magic since.

== Achievements ==
Season	Event type	Location	Format	Date	Rank
1996-97	Pro Tour	Dallas	Standard	22–24 November 1996	1
1996-97	Worlds	Seattle	Special	13–17 August 1997	3

Last updated: 24 August 2009
Source: On Tour, Part 1
Other accomplishments

- Pro Tour Player of the Year 1996-97

Preceded by (Sweden) Olle Råde	Pro Player of the Year; 1996-97	Succeeded by (United States) Jon Finkel
