= Mike Long =

American Magic: The Gathering player (born 1974)

- Born: 1974 (age 51–52); Albany, New York
- Education: James Madison University (Class of '97)
- Years active: 1995–2004
- Known for: Pro Tour (Magic: The Gathering)

Michael Long is a former professional Magic: The Gathering player who was a high-profile figure on the Pro Tour in its formative years.

== Magic: The Gathering ==
Magic: The Gathering career
- Pro Tour debut: 1996 Pro Tour New York
- Winnings: US$ 102,669
- Pro Tour wins (Top 8): 1 (4)
- Grand Prix wins (Top 8): 1 (4)
- Lifetime Pro Points: 191
- Planeswalker Level: 43 (Archmage)

Magic: The Gathering was released in 1993 and a Pro Tour launched the following year. Long proved to be an early celebrity champion. He was known for his charismatic persona, and often presented as a "villain" in the Magic tournaments. Long's first individual tournament win was at the Paris Pro Tour during the Magic: The Gathering Pro Tour season 1996–97. During the Paris tournament, Long debuted a "combo" called Prosperous Bloom that was notably the first successful combo deck in tournament-level play. During the last game of the finals, Long was playing against Mark Justice and faced losing when Justice played Coercion to find out Long was holding the only Drain Life in his deck (and his only way to win). Despite this, Justice pulled Cadaverous Bloom instead, thinking Long could get the Drain Life back with Elven Cache if allowed to generate the "cadaverous mana" for a large Prosperity. Little did he know Long had sideboarded them out (as he pointed out before draining Justice's life for a total of 44 points), Justice then conceded when Long asked him "if he needed to go through the motions" instead of watching the combo play out and fizzle. At the 1998 U.S. Nationals, Long was the subject of controversy over his potential act of cheating when a key card from his combo deck was found on Long's chair during a game. The head judge issued a match loss to Long, who went on to finish second in the tournament. Long won that year's Magic Invitational. The award was the chance to create a new card and inclusion in the card's art. That card, Rootwater Thief, was printed in the Nemesis set.

By his retirement, Long had won a Pro Tour, a Grand Prix, and an Invitational and held the record for being on the most winning national teams and was in the top lifetime money winners. Long's legacy also included one of the first player teams, created while he was still in college. He was responsible for several technical innovations; he designed a Vintage format combo deck, named "Long.dec" for him, that used Burning Wish to fetch Yawgmoth's Will out of the sideboard and set up a kill with Tendrils of Agony. Subsequent Vintage combo decks that use tutoring to set up a Tendrils kill have retained the name although the original deck was rendered unplayable by restrictions. In 2005, former organizer Mark Rosewater nominated Long for the Hall of Fame. This ignited debates over Long's impact on the game. Rosewater wrote, "He was an early pioneer in deck design and had an influence on how deck building technology evolved. He was a tournament organizer. He wrote about the game." Others felt Long did not qualify his entry due to the playing controversies. During the Pro Tour Los Angeles in 2000, Long had been given a warning for improperly shuffling his deck. Darwin Kastle made a further error when he cut Long's deck instead of shuffling. During the US Nationals Draft Challenge held at United States Nationals in 2000, Long was disqualified without prize and given a one-month suspension for presenting a deck that was not sufficiently randomized.

== Magic: The Gathering professional appearances ==
Season	Event type	Location	Format	Date	Rank
	Worlds	Seattle	National team	4–6 August 1995	1
1996	Worlds	Seattle	National team	1996	1
1996–97	Pro Tour	Atlanta	Sealed Deck	13–15 September 1996	6
1996–97	Invitational	Hong Kong	Special	14–16 February 1997	2
1996–97	Pro Tour	Paris	Block Constructed	11–13 April 1997	1
1996–97	Grand Prix	Washington D.C.	Limited	26–27 April 1997	1
1997–98	Invitational	Rio de Janeiro	Special	29 January–2 February 1998	5
1997–98	Worlds	Seattle	National team	12–16 August 1998	1
1998–99	Invitational	Barcelona	Special	4–7 February 1999	1
1998–99	Pro Tour	Los Angeles	Rochester Draft	26–28 February 1999	8
1999–00	Pro Tour	Los Angeles	Block Constructed	4–6 February 2000	4
1999–00	Invitational	Kuala Lumpur	Special	2–5 March 2000	7
1999–00	Grand Prix	Nagoya	Team Limited	22–23 April 2000	3
1999–00	Nationals	Orlando, Florida	Standard and Booster Draft	8–11 June 2000	5
2001–02	Nationals	Kissimmee, Florida	Standard and Booster Draft	31 May–2 June 2002	5
2002–03	Grand Prix	Pittsburgh	Team Limited	31 May–1 June 2003	4

Last updated: 31 July 2009
Source: Event Coverage at Wizards.com

== Early life, education, and career ==
Long was born in Albany, New York and later lived in Gambrills, Maryland where he attended the Severn School. He attended college at James Madison University in Harrisonburg, Virginia. At James Madison, he was a varsity wrestler and played on the James Madison Dukes football team. He began competing at Magic: The Gathering tournaments in 1995. After graduation, Long owned a game store called "The End" in Charlottesville and wrote strategy articles in addition to working on the professional tour. He began using Internet marketing for both his strategy articles and for card sales, and also started a search engine optimization business.

Preceded by N/A	Magic: The Gathering Team World Champion; With: Mark Justice; Henry Stern; Peter Leiher; 1995	Succeeded by (United States) United States; Dennis Bentley; George Baxter; Matt Place; Mike Long
Preceded by (United States) United States; Mark Justice; Henry Stern; Peter Leiher; Mike Long	Magic: The Gathering Team World Champion; With: Dennis Bentley; George Baxter; Matt Place; 1996	Succeeded by (Canada) Canada; Gary Krakower; Michael Donais; Ed Ito; Gabriel Tsang
Preceded by (United States) Darwin Kastle	Magic Invitational Champion; 1998	Succeeded by (United States) Chris Pikula
Preceded by (Canada) Canada; Gary Krakower; Michael Donais; Ed Ito; Gabriel Tsang	Magic: The Gathering Team World Champion; With: Matt Linde; Jon Finkel; Bryce Currence; 1998	Succeeded by (United States) United States; Kyle Rose; John Hunka; Zvi Mowshowitz; Charles Kornblith
