= Patrick Chapin =

American Magic: The Gathering player

- Nickname: "The Innovator"
- Nationality: American
- Pro Tour debut: Pro Tour Paris 1997
- Winnings: US$187,245
- Pro Tour wins (Top 8): 1 (6)
- Grand Prix wins (Top 8): 0 (4)
- Median Pro Tour Finish: 114
- Lifetime Pro Points: 349

Patrick Chapin is an American Magic: The Gathering Pro Tour player and a game designer for Eternal at Dire Wolf Digital.

== Achievements ==
Chapin has made six Pro Tour top eights, spanning three decades, and four Grand Prix top eights. In 2012, Chapin was voted into the Magic: The Gathering Hall of Fame. His induction took place during Pro Tour Return to Ravnica in October 2012. A mirror match against Gabriel Nassif at Worlds 2007 featuring Chapin's Dragonstorm deck "remains one of the most entertaining matches of Magic ever seen on camera".

Season	Event type	Location	Format	Date	Rank
1996–97	Pro Tour	New York	Booster Draft	30 May–1 June 1997	8
1998–99	Pro Tour	Los Angeles	Rochester Draft	26–28 February 1999	6
2001–02	Grand Prix	Milwaukee	Standard	11–12 May 2002	2
2007	Worlds	New York	Special	6–9 December 2007	2
2011	Pro Tour	Paris	Standard	10–13 February 2011	6
2011	Grand Prix	Pittsburgh	Standard	27–28 August 2011	3
2012	Grand Prix	Orlando	Standard	14–15 January 2012	2
2013–14	Pro Tour	Atlanta	Block Constructed	16–18 May 2014	1
2014–15	Worlds	Nice	Special	2–7 December 2014	2
2015–16	Grand Prix	Indianapolis	Standard	31 October–1 November 2015	6

Last updated: 9 March 2016
Source: Event Coverage at Wizards.com

Chapin is the author of two books, Next Level Magic, published in 2010, and Next Level Deckbuilding. He has published over 85 articles on Star City Games and produces Top Level Podcast with Michael Flores. In 2011, he published a rap album with Bill Boulden, Tha Gatherin.
