= Magic: The Gathering Pro Tour season 1996 =

1996 Pro Tour season
- Pro Player of the Year: (Sweden) Olle Råde
- Rookie of the Year: none awarded
- World Champion: (Australia) Tom Chanpheng
- Pro Tours: 4
- Start of season: 17 February 1996
- End of season: 18 August 1996

The 1996 Pro Tour season was the first season of the Magic: The Gathering Pro Tour. At the end of 1995 Wizards of the Coast had announced the introduction of a tournament series featuring big cash prizes. Originally coined the "Black Lotus Pro Tour" the tournaments were simply called "Pro Tours" and the name was thus changed quickly. The first Pro Tour, held in New York in February 1996, was won by the American Michael Loconto. Los Angeles and Ohio were the other Pro Tours in the inaugural season along with the 1996 World Championships in Seattle. At the end of the season Olle Råde was proclaimed the first Pro Tour Player of the Year.

== Mode ==
Four Pro Tours were held in the 1996 season. As Grands Prix had not been introduced, those Pro Tours were the only events to award Pro Points. Based on final standings Pro Points were awarded as follows:

| Rank | 1 | 2 | 3–4 | 5–8 | 9–16 | 17–32 | 33–64 | 65+ |
| Pro Points | 30 | 25 | 20 | 10 | 4 | 2 | 1 | 0 |

== Pro Tour – New York (17–18 February 1996) ==
Pro Tour New York was the first Pro Tour ever held. While being the first Magic tournament to award sizeable cash prizes, the total amount of $30,000 was still small compared to subsequent Pro Tours, which featured prizes well in excess of $300,000. The tournament consisted of only seven rounds of Swiss play, which were followed by a cut to top 16. Those 16 players returned on Sunday to determine the winner in four rounds of single elimination. As Wizards tried to find an adequate tournament mode for a professional circuit, several things were done different in New York than at later Pro Tours. Most notably, PT New York was the only Pro Tour to feature a unique format. Rather than a previously-established format, a modification of Type II was used, in which every player's deck was required to include at least five cards from each set legal in Type II at that time. New York also introduced the play-draw rule to reduce the advantage of beginning the game. Previously, the starting player would draw a card on their first turn. Instead, one player would be given the choice to either "play first," forfeiting their first draw step, or "draw first," thus playing second. This rule proved successful, and remains in place to this day.

Pro Tour New York is also known as PT Speed Dial, because players had to call the Wizards of the Coast offices to register for one of the available slots. Several players, considered by Wizards of the Coast to be the best at the game, were also invited to play to make the inaugural tournament more attractive. Eventually the first PT started off on a sour note, being delayed by four hours due to a snow storm.

The top 8 featured Eric Tam, the current Canadian national champion, and Bertrand Lestrée, vice-champion of the first World Championship in 1994. Mark Justice, who was by most perceived to be the best of world at that time, also made it to the final eight, but eventually the rather unknown Michael Loconto took the title in a final that was supposed to be best of seven games, but was eventually reduced to a best of three after the first two games had taken so long.

=== Tournament data ===
Prize pool: $30,000 ($60,000 including scholarships for the Junior Division)
Players: 239
Format: Standard, New York Style (Decks must have five cards from each available expansion in either deck or sideboard)

=== Top 8 ===
Quarter-finals
Preston Poulter | 2
Mark Justice | 1
Michael Loctono | 2
Eric Tam | 0
Bertrand Lestree | 2
Shawn Regnier | 1
Leon Lindbäck | 2
George Baxter | 1

Semi-finals
Preston Poulter | 2
Michael Loconto | 3
Bertrand Lestree | 3
Leon Lindbäck | 0

Finals
Michael Loconto | 2
Bertrand Lestree | 1

=== Final standings ===
| Place | Player | Prize | Pro Points |
|---|---|---|---|
| 1 | (United States) Michael Loconto | $12,000 | 30 |
| 2 | (France) Bertrand Lestrée | $5,000 | 25 |
| 3 | (Sweden) Leon Lindbäck | $2,500 | 20 |
| 3 | (United States) Preston Poulter | $2,500 | 20 |
| 5 | (United States) George H. Baxter | $1,000 | 10 |
| 5 | (United States) Mark Justice | $1,000 | 10 |
| 5 | (United States) Shawn "Hammer" Regnier | $1,000 | 10 |
| 5 | (Canada) Eric Tam | $1,000 | 10 |

=== Junior division ===
Pro Tour New York, just as most of the other early Pro Tours, had a Junior Division for underage players. It was won by Graham Tatomer in a final against Aaron Kline. The first prize was a $12,000 scholarship. The semi-finalists were Maxwell Suver, and Ross Sclafani, and the quarter-finalists were Brendon Herzog, Jon Finkel, Jason Norment, and Nate Foure.

== Pro Tour – Los Angeles (3–5 May 1996) ==
In contrast to New York the PT Los Angeles was an invite-only tournament as were all subsequent Pro Tours. Los Angeles was also the first major tournament to feature only Limited play. The all-American top 8 featured several big names, including Darwin Kastle and Scott Johns as well as Shawn "Hammer" Reigner and Preston Poulter who had already made it to the final stage in New York. This time Reigner took the title, defeating Thomas Guevin in a five-hour final match.

=== Tournament data ===
Prize pool: $100,000 ($130,000 including scholarships for the Junior Division)
Players: 179
Format: Booster Draft (4th Edition-4th Edition-Homelands)
Head Judge: Tom Wylie

=== Top 8 ===
Quarter-finals
Darwin Kastle | 3
Vaughn Sandor | 2
Shawn Regnier | 3
Preston Poulter | 0
Tom Guevin | 3
Scott Johns | 0
Mark Venhaus | 3
Jeffrey Wood | 2

Semi-finals
Darwin Kastle | 1
Shawn Regnier | 3
Tom Guevin | 3
Mark Venhaus | 0

Finals
Shawn Regnier | 3
Tom Guevin | 2

=== Final standings ===
| Place | Player | Prize | Pro Points | Comments |
|---|---|---|---|---|
| 1 | (United States) Shawn "Hammer" Regnier | $17,000 | 30 | 2nd Final Day |
| 2 | (United States) Thomas Guevin | $10,000 | 25 | |
| 3 | (United States) Darwin Kastle | $5,900 | 20 | |
| 3 | (United States) Mark Venhaus | $5,900 | 20 | |
| 5 | (United States) Scott Johns | $3,500 | 10 | |
| 5 | (United States) Preston Poulter | $3,500 | 10 | 2nd Final Day |
| 5 | (United States) Vaughn Sandor | $3,500 | 10 | |
| 5 | (United States) Jeffrey Wood | $3,500 | 10 | |

=== Junior Division ===
Max Szlager won the Junior Division over Paul McCabe. The other semi-finalists were Brian Wilson and Jason Norment.

=== Pro Player of the year standings ===
| Rank | Player | Pro Points |
|---|---|---|
| 1 | (United States) Shawn Regnier | 40 |
| 2 | (United States) Michael Loconto | 32 |
| 3 | (United States) Preston Poulter | 30 |
| 4 | (United States) Thomas Guevin | 25 |
| 4 | (France) Bertrand Lestrée | 25 |

== Pro Tour – Columbus (6–7 July 1996) ==
PT Columbus is known to be the shortest Pro Tour ever. It was held at the Origins convention in conjunction with the US Nationals and had scheduled the Nationals Top 4 as well as the Swiss portion of the PT on Saturday. On Sunday, after 14 rounds of Swiss, the top 4 of the Pro Tour were played out in single-elimination to determine the winner. Columbus featured an all-new kind of format in Block Constructed, allowing only cards from Ice Age and Alliances. In the final Olle Råde, also known as "the little Viking" defeated Sean Fleischman to become the first Pro Tour winner not coming from the USA. Råde was only 17 years old and had elected to play in the master division of the tournament despite still being eligible for the junior division. He won the tournament with an aggressive green-red deck. Terry Borer won the Junior Division over Paul McCabe. Scott Johns finished amongst the best eight players as he did in the previous and would in the subsequent Pro Tour. However, as the tournament was cut to a Top 4 his three consecutive Top 8 finishes did not draw that much attention.

=== Tournament data ===
Prize pool: $125,000 ($155,000 including scholarships for the Junior Division)
Players: 136
Format: Ice Age Block Constructed (Ice Age, Alliances)
Head Judge: Tom Wylie

=== Top 4 ===
Semi-Finals
1 | Alvaro Marques | 2
4 | Sean Fleischman | 3
3 | Peter Radonjic | 1
2 | Olle Råde | 3

Finals
Sean Fleischman | 1
Olle Råde | 3

=== Final standings ===
| Place | Player | Prize | Pro Points | Comments |
|---|---|---|---|---|
| 1 | (Sweden) Olle Råde | $22,000 | 30 | |
| 2 | (United States) Sean Fleischman | $12,800 | 25 | |
| 3 | (Canada) Alvaro Marques | $7,500 | 20 | |
| 3 | (Canada) Peter Radonjic | $7,500 | 20 | |
| 5 | (United States) Brian Weissman | $4,400 | 10 | |
| 6 | (United States) Javier Garavito | $4,400 | 10 | |
| 7 | (United States) John Immordino | $4,400 | 10 | |
| 8 | (United States) Scott Johns | $4,400 | 10 | 2nd Top 8 finish |

=== Pro Player of the year standings ===
| Rank | Player | Pro Points |
|---|---|---|
| 1 | (United States) Shawn Regnier | 41 |
| 2 | (United States) Michael Loconto | 33 |
| 3 | (United States) Sean Fleischman | 31 |
| 4 | (United States) Preston Poulter | 30 |
| 4 | (Sweden) Olle Råde | 30 |

== 1996 World Championships – Seattle (14–18 August 1996) ==
The 1996 World Championship was held at the Wizards of the Coast headquarters in Seattle and became the Pro Tour with the fewest competitors ever. Scott Johns reached his third consecutive Pro Tour top 8 within a season, a feat not yet achieved by anybody else. Also amongst the final eight were Mark Justice and Henry Stern who had finished a joint third at the previous World Championships. Eventually Tom Chanpheng from Australia became World Champion and the United States defended their team title.

=== Tournament data ===
Prize pool: $132,000
Players: 125
Formats: Booster Draft, Standard, Type 1.5, Team Sealed

=== Final standings ===
| Place | Player | Prize | Pro Points | Comments |
|---|---|---|---|---|
| 1 | (Australia) Tom Chanpheng | $26,000 | 30 | |
| 2 | (United States) Mark Justice | $16,000 | 25 | 2nd Final day |
| 3 | (United States) Henry Stern | $9,000 | 20 | |
| 4 | (Sweden) Olle Råde | $9,000 | 20 | 2nd Final Day |
| 5 | (United States) Matt Place | $5,500 | 10 | |
| 6 | (United States) Scott Johns | $5,500 | 10 | 3rd Top 8 finish |
| 7 | (Canada) Eric Tam | $5,500 | 10 | 2nd Final day |
| 8 | (Finland) Tommi Hovi | $5,500 | 10 | |

=== National team competition ===
1. United States (Dennis Bentley, George Baxter, Mike Long, Matt Place)
2. Czech Republic (David Korejtko, Jakub Slemr, Ondrej Baudys, Lukas Kocourek)

== Pro Player of the year final standings ==
At the end of the season Olle Råde was awarded Pro Player of the Year despite having competed in only two Pro Tours, winning one and finishing fourth in the other.

| Rank | Player | Pro Points |
|---|---|---|
| 1 | (Sweden) Olle Råde | 50 |
| 2 | (United States) Shawn Regnier | 41 |
| 3 | (United States) Mark Justice | 37 |
| 4 | (United States) Michael Loconto | 34 |
| 5 | (United States) Sean Fleischman | 31 |
| 5 | (United States) Preston Poulter | 31 |
