= Magic: The Gathering Pro Tour season 1996–97 =

Second season of Magic: The Gathering Pro Tour

1996–97 Pro Tour season
- Pro Player of the Year: (Canada) Paul McCabe
- Rookie of the Year: none awarded
- World Champion: (Czech Republic) Jakub Slemr
- Pro Tours: 6
- Grands Prix: 5
- Start of season: 13 September 1996
- End of season: 17 August 1997

The 1996–97 Pro Tour season was the second season of the Magic: The Gathering Pro Tour. It began on 13 September 1996 with Pro Tour Atlanta, and ended on 17 August 1997 with the conclusion of 1997 World Championship in Seattle. The season consisted of five Grand Prix, and six Pro Tours, located in Atlanta, Dallas, Los Angeles, Paris, New York, and Seattle. At the end of the season Paul McCabe from Canada was awarded the Pro Player of the year title. It was the first season to host Grand Prix, which are major tournaments awarding cash prizes and Pro Points, but open to all players.

== Mode ==
Six Pro Tours were held in the 1996–97 season. Five Grand Prixs were held in the season. However, they did not award Pro Points. Based on final Pro Tour standings Pro Points were awarded as follows:

Rank	1	2	3–4	5–8	9–16	17–32	33–64	65+
Pro Points	30	25	20	10	4	2	1	0

== Pro Tour – Atlanta (13–15 September 1996) ==
Atlanta was the only Pro Tour ever to host an individual Sealed Deck competition as the main event. Furthermore, the cards were all previously unknown to the players as Mirage product was used, but Mirage had not been officially released yet. Also Atlanta was the first Pro Tour that allowed players to intentionally draw matches. In the end German Frank Adler won Pro Tour Atlanta over Darwin Kastle.

=== Tournament data ===
Prize pool: $150,000 ($250,000 including Team Competition and scholarships for the Junior Division)
Players: 192
Format: Sealed Deck (Mirage)

=== Final standings ===
Place	Player	Prize	Comment
1	(Germany) Frank Adler	$26,000	1st German to win a Pro Tour
2	(United States) Darwin Kastle	$16,000	2nd Final day
3	(United States) Aaron Muranaka	$9,000	
4	(United States) John Yoo	$9,000	
5	(Canada) Terry Borer	$5,500	
6	(United States) Mike Long	$5,500	
7	(United States) Chris Pikula	$5,500	
8	(Canada) Matthew Vienneau	$5,500	

=== Other divisions ===
Aaron Souders won the Junior Division against Louis Beryl. Jason Gordon and Daniel Connelly were the other semi-finalists. The quarter-finalists were David Lively, Trevor Blackwell, James Murphy, and Alexander Sutherland. The team of Mark Chalice, Scott Johns, Mark Justice, Preston Poulter, and Mario Robaina won the Team Competition against Dave Lyon, Mike Reinking, Kevin Stelzer, Jeff Sternal, and Chris Stelzer for a prize of $11,000.

== Pro Tour – Dallas (22–24 November 1996) ==
Eventual Pro Player of the year Paul McCabe won Pro Tour Dallas. The Canadian defeated Jason Zila from the US in the final. Olle Råde had his third Top 8 appearance while playing only his fourth Pro Tour. Pro Tour Dallas also featured a Type I (now Vintage) division, which Scott Johns won. Justin Schneider won the Junior Division for $16,000 scholarship over Jeremy Baca in the finals. Eventual Hall of Famer Patrick Chapin and Jeff Simoneau lost in the semi-finals.

=== Tournament data ===
Prize pool: $150,000 ($250,000 including Classic Division and Junior Division scholarships)
Players: 242
Format: Standard

=== Final standings ===
Place	Player	Prize	Comment
1	(Canada) Paul McCabe	$26,000	1st Canadian to win a Pro Tour
2	(United States) Jason Zila	$16,000	
3	(United States) Brian Hacker	$9,000	
4	(United States) Chris Pikula	$9,000	2nd Final day
5	(United States) George Baxter	$5,500	2nd Final day
6	(Sweden) Olle Råde	$5,500	3rd Final day
7	(United States) Robert Thornburg	$5,500	
8	(Germany) Peer Kröger	$5,500	

=== Top 8 ===
Quarter-finals
1	Brian Hacker	2
8	Olle Rade	0
5	Paul McCabe	2
4	Robert Thornburg	0
3	Chris Pikula	2
6	George Baxter	1
7	Peer Kröger	0
2	Jason Zila	2

Semi-finals
Brian Hacker	0
Paul McCabe	3
Chris Pikula	0
Jason Zila	3

Finals
Paul McCabe	3
Jason Zila	0

=== Junior Division ===
Justin Schneider won the finals of the Junior Division against Jeremy Baca for a $16,000 scholarship. The other semi-finalists were Patrick Chapin and Jeff Simoneau. The quarter-finalists were Jason Moungey, Vinnie Falcone, Yubin Tao, and Adam Jansen.

== Pro Tour – Los Angeles (28 February – 2 March 1997) ==
Tommi Hovi won Pro Tour Los Angeles, winning the final against David Mills. It was the only Pro Tour final ever to be decided by a disqualification. With the score 2–1 up in his favor Mills was disqualified because he repeatedly tapped his lands after (rather than before) attempting to play a spell, which was not allowed at the time. An upset amongst the players followed. It was eventually decided that Mills would be allowed to claim his prize, despite being originally disqualified without prize. Wizards of the Coast tournament manager Andrew Finch explained the reason for overturning the ruling: "We felt, however, that this outcome would be most detrimental to the Pro Tour, so we've decided that the penalty in this case will be loss of match."

Los Angeles was also the first Pro Tour to use the so-called Paris Mulligan. Previously players were allowed to take a mulligan if they had an all-land or no-land starting hand. Instead players could now mulligan whenever they wished to do so, but had to draw an opening hand with one card less. The name Paris Mulligan actually refers to the subsequent Pro Tour in Paris, which was the first Constructed Pro Tour to use this rule.

Jess Means won the finals of the Junior Division against eventual Hall of Famer Zvi Mowshowitz.

=== Tournament data ===
Prize pool: $150,000
Players: 236
Format: Rochester Draft (Mirage-Visions)
Head Judge: Tom Wylie

=== Final standings ===
Place	Player	Prize	Comment
1	(Finland) Tommi Hovi	$26,000	2nd Final day, 1st Finn to win a Pro Tour
2	(United States) David Mills	$16,000	
3	(United States) Alan Comer	$9,000	
4	(United States) John Yoo	$9,000	2nd Final day
5	(United States) Truc Bui	$5,500	
6	(United States) John Immordino	$5,500	2nd Final day
7	(United States) Brian Weissman	$5,500	2nd Final day
8	(Belgium) Ben Possemiers	$5,500	1st Belgian in a Top 8

== Grand Prix – Amsterdam ==
GP Amsterdam (22–23 March)

1. (France) Emmanuel Vernay
2. (France) David Nott
3. (Netherlands) Wessel Oomens
3. (Netherlands) Sven Dijt
5. (Netherlands) Roeland Van der Hoevenen
5. (Netherlands) Matt Henstra
5. (Germany) Michael Huth
5. (Belgium) Dominique Coene

== Pro Tour – Paris (11–13 April 1997) ==
Paris was the first Pro Tour held outside the United States. In the finals, the biggest names of Magic at the time (Mike Long and Mark Justice) met to determine the champion. Both decks present in the final belonged to Long as he had previously loaned his deck to Justice. Eventually Long won the match, en route winning a game which his Combo deck was not capable of winning any more, but he convinced Justice to concede anyway.

=== Tournament data ===
Prize pool: $150,000
Players: 223
Format: Mirage Block Constructed (Mirage, Visions)

=== Final standings ===
Place	Player	Prize	Comment
1	(United States) Mike Long	$26,000	2nd Final day
2	(United States) Mark Justice	$16,000	3rd Final day
3	(United States) Darwin Kastle	$9,000	3rd Final day
4	(Germany) Henning Rimkus	$9,000	
5	(Norway) Sturla Bingen	$5,500	1st Norwegian in a Top 8
6	(United States) Paul Ferker	$5,500	
7	(United States) Jason Gordon	$5,500	
8	(United States) Jason Zila	$5,500	2nd Final day

== Grand Prix – Washington D.C., Tokyo, Barcelona ==
GP Washington D.C. (26–27 April)

1. (United States) Mike Long
2. (United States) David Price
3. (United States) Nate Clarke
4. (United States) Chad Solo
5. (United States) Scott Seville
6. (United States) Michael Pustilnik
7. (Canada) Terry Borer
8. (United States) Dennis Bentley

GP Tokyo (4–5 May)

1. (Japan) Kenichi Fujita
2. (Japan) Toshiki Tsukamoto
3. (Japan) Yoshiyuki Tsuruta
3. (Japan) Yoshikazu Ishii
5. (Japan) Goro Matsuo
5. (Japan) Masami Ibamoto
5. (Japan) Satoshi Nakamura
5. (Japan) Takashi Niwa

GP Barcelona (4–5 May)

1. (France) Pierre Fayard
2. (France) Alain Fernandez
3. (Spain) Ivan Garcia
3. (Spain) Santiago Rodriguez
5. (France) Mathieu Poujade
5. (France) Nicholas Olivieri
5. (Spain) Joaquim Casa
5. (France) Michel Debard

== Pro Tour – New York (30 May – 1 June 1997) ==
Canadian Terry Borer won Pro Tour New York, defeating Ivan Stanoev in the finals. In the finals of Junior Division Ron Franke beat Jamie Parke.

=== Tournament data ===
Prize pool: $150,000
Players: 259
Format: Booster Draft (5th Edition-Visions)

=== Final standings ===
Place	Player	Prize	Comment
1	(Canada) Terry Borer	$26,000	2nd Final day
2	(Czech Republic) Ivan Stanoev	$16,000	1st Czech in a Top 8
3	(Canada) Gabriel Tsang	$9,000	
4	(Netherlands) Jeroen Weyden	$9,000	1st Dutch Player in a Top 8
5	(United States) Mark Chalice	$5,500	
6	(United States) John Chinnock	$5,500	
7	(United States) Michael Pustilnik	$5,500	
8	(United States) Patrick Chapin	$5,500	

== Grand Prix – London ==
GP London (12–13 July)

1. (France) Michel Sochon
2. (France) Cyrille DeFoucaud
3. (England) Ollie Schneider
3. (Scotland) Graham Thomson
5. (Belgium) Ben Possemiers
5. (Germany) Daniel Brickwell
5. (England) Robin McCandless
5. (France) Frederic Bannach

== 1997 World Championships – Seattle (13–17 August 1997) ==
Jakub Slemr from the Czech Republic won the World Championship. He defeated Janosch Kühn from Germany in the final, playing a mainly black aggro-deck, dipping into all other colours for utility. Canada won the team competition in a final against Sweden.

=== Tournament data ===
Prize pool: $200,000 (individual) + $50,000 (national teams)
Players: 153
Format: Standard, Rochester Draft (Mirage-Visions-Weatherlight), Extended

=== Final standings ===
Place	Player	Prize	Comment
1	(Czech Republic) Jakub Slemr	$34,000	1st Czech to win a Pro Tour
2	(Germany) Janosch Kühn	$22,000	Pro Tour debut
3	(Canada) Paul McCabe	$12,000	2nd Final day
4	(Denmark) Svend Geertsen	$12,000	1st Dane in a Top 8
5	(Canada) Gabriel Tsang	$8,000	2nd Final day
6	(Sweden) Nikolai Weibull	$8,000	
7	(United States) Nate Clarke	$8,000	
8	(United States) John Chinnock	$8,000	2nd Final day

=== National team competition ===
1. Canada (Gary Krakower, Michael Donais, Ed Ito, Gabriel Tsang)
2. Sweden (Nikolai Weibull, Mattias Jorstedt, Marcus Angelin, Johan Cedercrantz)

== Pro Player of the year final standings ==
After the World Championship Paul McCabe was awarded the Pro Player of the year title.

Rank	Player	Pro Points
1	(Canada) Paul McCabe	52
2	(Canada) Terry Borer	47
2	(United States) John Yoo	47
4	(United States) Mike Long	46
5	(United States) Darwin Kastle	45
