= Nathan Steuer =

American Magic: The Gathering player (born 2002)

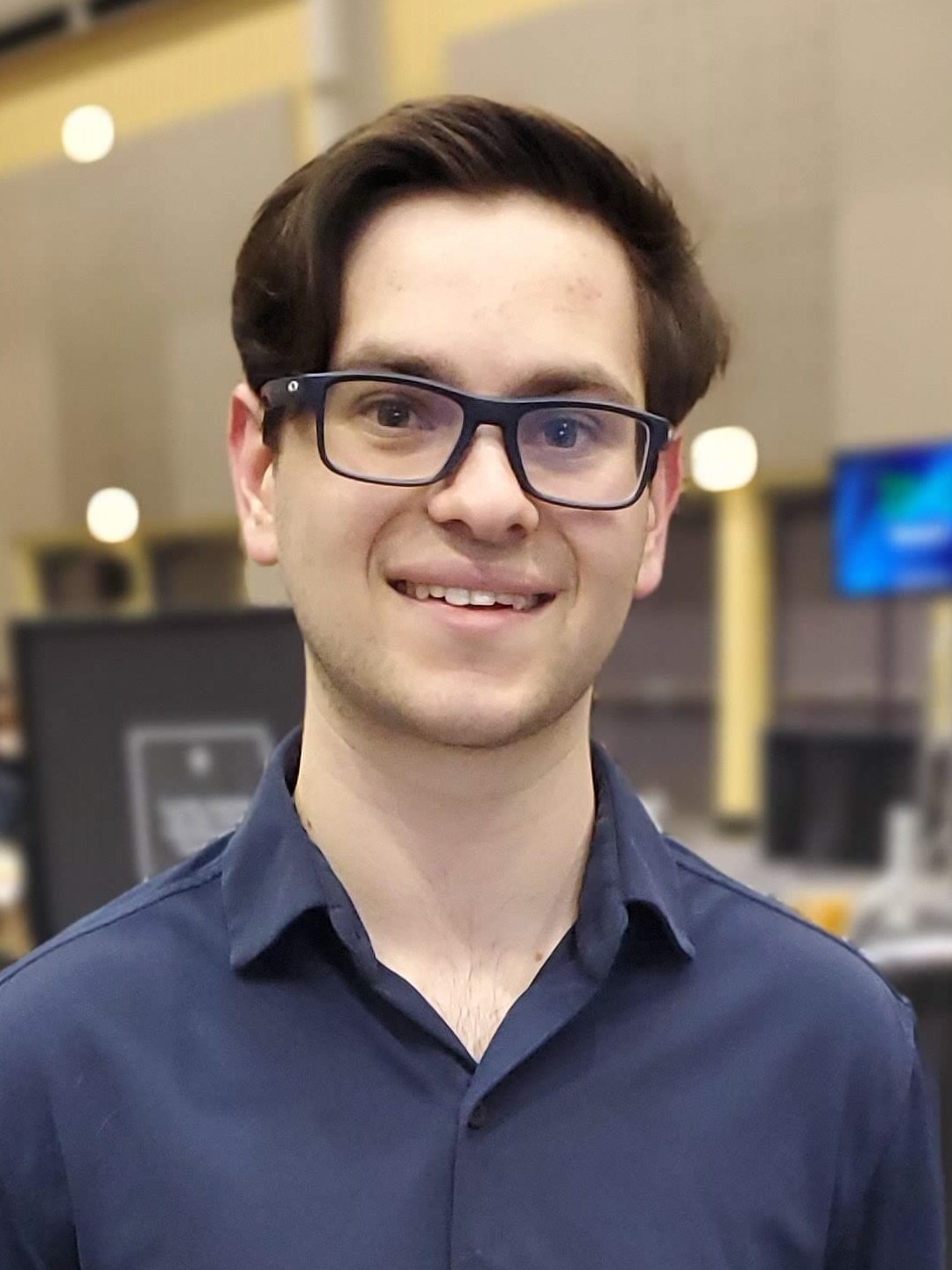
- Steuer in 2024
- Born: October 21, 2002 (age 23); Berkeley, California, U.S.
- Pro Tour debut: 2018
- Winnings: $242,400

Nathan Steuer (born October 21, 2002) is an American player of the card game Magic: The Gathering. He won the Magic: The Gathering World Championship in 2022 and has won two Pro Tour titles, at Pro Tour March of the Machine in 2023 and Pro Tour Secrets of Strixhaven in 2026. He was a prodigy, making the second day of a competitive tournament at the age of 12, attending high-level tournaments continuously from the age of 17, and leaving college to play Magic professionally in 2022. He was a founding member of "Team Handshake", one of the most successful competitive Magic teams, and his 2022–2023 run of tournament placements and wins is considered among the greatest of the game's history.

== Personal life ==
Nathan Steuer was born on October 21, 2002, and grew up in Berkeley, California. He has a sister, and a twin brother with whom he learned Magic: The Gathering. He attended Berkeley High School from 2016 to 2020, then attended the University of California, Santa Cruz, from 2020 until he left in 2022 to focus on playing Magic. He lives in Alexandria, Virginia, with his girlfriend and four cats.

== Magic career ==
Steuer first played Magic: The Gathering with his brother and friends at Jewish summer camp in Santa Rosa, California, while he was in elementary school. His first official event was a Gatecrash prerelease in 2013, and after that he threw himself into the competition.

By 2015, Steuer was playing nearly seven days a week at a San Francisco game store. As he was still a pre-teen, other players would tease him about the "age 13+" label on Magic packaging, and he would reply "It's just recommended". He traveled to competitive events, attending Grand Prix Las Vegas in May 2015, and reaching the second day of Grand Prix San Diego in August 2015. There he did not make the Top 8 for the third day, but did play in a feature match (one that was streamed on video), and won a game against legendary player Reid Duke. From that time, Steuer was considered a prodigy, and gradually advanced through competitive ranks. His first Pro Tour was Pro Tour 25th Anniversary in August 2018, and he has played in every high level pro tour event since Mythic Championship VI Richmond in November 2019.

In February 2022, Steuer won the MOCS, the Magic Online Championship Showcase, with six match wins and zero losses. Subsequently, he left college to focus on Magic. On October 8, 2022, he won the MOCS again.

On October 30, 2022, Steuer won the Magic: The Gathering World Championship in Las Vegas, Nevada. This was called both Magic World Championship XXVIII and Magic30, as it was the 28th World Championship, but the event was the 30th anniversary of the Magic: The Gathering game. His nemesis in the championship was Lebanese Magic player Eli Kassis. Steuer lost the last round to Kassis on day two of the championship, which nearly eliminated him from the third day and top-four bracket. Steuer again lost to Kassis 2-1 in the first match of the top four, as every best-of-three match in the top four went to game three. Both won their next two matches to face each other in the final. Steuer won the last game, to win the Championship and $100,000. Though a prodigy, and called "the youngest MTG world champ ever" in one interview, Steuer was not actually the youngest Magic world champion, as Julien Nuijten was only fifteen years old when he won in 2004.

Steuer made the Top 8 of Pro Tour Phyrexia: All Will be One in Philadelphia in February 2023, coming in sixth after losing a close match to his 2015 opponent, Reid Duke, who went on to win the event. Steuer then came back to win the next event, Pro Tour March of the Machine in Minneapolis in May 2023. Just by making the playoffs of Pro Tour March of the Machine, Steuer became one of only four players in Magic: The Gathering history to make the finals of three consecutive premier events. The two MOCS wins, world championship win, Pro Tour Phyrexia: All Will Be One Top 8 appearance, and Pro Tour March of the Machine win made a series of five top finishes for Steuer over 15 months, and was considered among the greatest Magic tournament runs in the game's history.

In February 2024, Steuer was depicted on his own Magic card, "Duelist of the Mind".

In May 2026, Steuer won Pro Tour Secrets of Strixhaven at MagicCon: Las Vegas, earning his second Pro Tour title and the $50,000 first-place prize.

=== Team Handshake ===
In early 2020, Steuer was a founding member of Team Swan MTG, a group of Magic: The Gathering Online players cooperating for MTGO Showcase Challenges, on the path to the MOCS contests. By October 2022, the team had grown to 16 members, including newer players like Steuer and older champions like Paulo Vitor Damo da Rosa; some of them only met in person for the first time at the World Championship XXVIII. In multiple ways, Team Swan MTG dominated the contest: half of them had qualified for it, making up a quarter of the 32 players competing for the title; four of them, including Steuer, were the only ones to go without losses during the Limited portion; and Steuer won the contest.

After that event, the team began formally calling themselves Team Handshake, and informally "Team 50%", due to making up 50% of the Top 8 and Top 16 at the New Capenna Championship in May 2022, and of the Top 4 and Top 8 at Worlds. They did not do as well during Pro Tour Phyrexia in February 2023, with only Steuer making the Top 8, but came back to put four of their members into the Top 8 of Pro Tour March of the Machine in May 2023, with Steuer personally winning the event.

By late 2023, Steuer and Team Handshake were sponsored by card game accessory company Ultimate Guard, and had an informal rivalry with Ultimate Guard's older team, Team ChannelFireball, founded in 2010. The older team boasted more lifetime wins, and four members of the Magic: The Gathering Hall of Fame (including Reid Duke) to Team Handshake's none, while Handshake had two world champions (Steuer and 2018, and 2024's Javier Dominguez), to ChannelFireball's one (2015, and 2025's Seth Manfield). Between them, members of the two teams have won most of the Magic tournaments since the revival of the Pro Tour in 2023.
