= Magic: The Gathering Pro Tour season 1997–98 =

1997–98 Pro Tour season
- Pro Player of the Year: (United States) Jon Finkel
- Rookie of the Year: (United States) Randy Buehler
- World Champion: (United States) Brian Selden
- Pro Tours: 5
- Grands Prix: 13
- Start of season: 30 August 1997
- End of season: 16 August 1998

The 1997–98 Pro Tour season was the third season of the Magic: The Gathering Pro Tour. It began on 30 August 1997 with Grand Prix Toronto, and ended on 16 August 1998 with the conclusion of 1998 World Championship in Seattle. The season consisted of thirteen Grand Prix, and five Pro Tours, located in Chicago, Mainz, Los Angeles, New York, and Seattle. At the end of the season Jon Finkel from the United States was awarded the Pro Player of the Year title.

== Grand Prix – Toronto, Copenhagen ==
GP Toronto (30–31 August)

1. (United States) Brian Kibler
2. (United States) Erik Lauer
3. (Canada) Tony Tsai
3. (United States) Matt Place
5. (United States) Dan Silberman
5. (United States) Steven O'Mahoney-Schwartz
5. (United States) Mike Turian
5. (United States) Bruce Cowley

GP Copenhagen (6–7 September)

1. (Denmark) Karsten Hoppe
2. (Norway) Sigurd Eskeland
3. (Sweden) David Linder
3. (Sweden) Thomas Lindohf
5. (Sweden) Kristian Hellman
5. (Denmark) Jesper Thrane
5. (Sweden) Martin Jordö
5. (Sweden) Frederik Thorstensson

== Pro Tour – Chicago (10–12 October 1997) ==
Attending a Pro Tour for the first time, Randy Buehler defeated David Mills in the finals to win the inaugural Pro Tour of the 1997–98 season. Olle Råde's final eight appearance made him the first player to reach the Top 8 four times.

=== Tournament data ===
Prize pool: $151,635
Players: 324
Format: Extended

=== Final standings ===
Place	Player	Prize	Comment
1	(United States) Randy Buehler	$25,000	Pro Tour debut
2	(United States) David Mills	$15,000	2nd Final day
3	(United States) Jon Finkel	$10,000	
4	(United States) Max Suver	$8,000	
5	(United States) Adrian Sayers	$6,500	
6	(United States) Justin Schneider	$5,500	
7	(United States) Kyle Rose	$4,800	
8	(Sweden) Olle Råde	$4,300	4th Final day

== Grand Prix – Como ==
GP Como (8–9 November)

1. (France) Michaël Debard
2. (Czech Republic) Lukas Ladra
3. (Switzerland) Roger Leu
3. (Switzerland) Michael Suwald
5. (Italy) Luca Chiera
5. (Republic of Ireland) David Kearney
5. (France) Pierre Vandercamere
5. (France) Gilles Martinau

== Pro Tour – Mainz (5–7 December 1997) ==
Eventual Pro Player of the year Paul McCabe won Pro Tour Dallas. The Canadian defeated Jason Zila from the US in the final. Olle Råde had his third Top 8 appearance while playing only his fourth Pro Tour.

=== Tournament data ===
Prize pool: $151,635
Players: 291
Format: Rochester Draft (Tempest)

=== Final standings ===
Place	Player	Prize	Comment
1	(United States) Matt Place	$25,000	2nd Final day
2	(United States) Steven O'Mahoney-Schwartz	$15,000	
3	(Germany) Peer Kröger	$10,000	2nd Final day
4	(United States) Kurt Burgner	$8,000	
5	(England) John Ormerod	$6,500	1st English in a Top 8
6	(United States) Chris Bishop	$5,500	
7	(United States) Mark Le Pine	$4,800	
8	(Italy) Gabriele Pisicchio	$4,300	1st Italian in a Top 8

== Grand Prix – San Francisco, Madrid, Rio de Janeiro, Lyon, Melbourne ==
GP San Francisco (6–7 December)

1. (United States) Robert Swarowski
2. (Canada) Ryan Fuller
3. (United States) Steve Shears
4. (United States) Brett Quorn
5. (United States) Daniel Clegg
6. (United States) Steve Aldrich
7. (United States) Ernest Alexander
8. (United States) Casey McCarrel

GP Lyon (7–8 February)

1. (France) Raphaël Lévy
2. (Belgium) Kurt Foket
3. (France) Manuel Bevand
4. (France) Michaël Debard
5. (France) Emmanuel Beltrando
6. (France) Loïc Degrou
7. (France) Nicolas Lacorne
8. (France) Laurent Laclaverie

GP Madrid (24–25 January)

1. (United States) Steven O'Mahoney-Schwartz
2. (France) Michaël Debard
3. (France) Jérémie Lagarde
4. (France) Herve Drevillon
5. (Spain) Christian Celades
6. (Spain) Omar Sagol
7. (Italy) Gabriele Pisicchio
8. (Spain) Marc Iglesias

GP Melbourne (14–15 February)

1. (Australia) Philip Davey
2. (Australia) Matt Goodall
3. (Australia) Lenny Collins
4. (Australia) Craig Sheppard
5. (Australia) Daniel Turner
6. (Australia) Adam Kemp
7. (Australia) Kevin Cheng
8. (Australia) Andrew Corney

GP Rio de Janeiro (31 January – 1 February)

1. (United States) Jon Finkel
2. (United States) Steven O'Mahoney-Schwartz
3. (Brazil) Carlos Jeucken
4. (United States) Adam Katz
5. (Brazil) Leandro Buck
6. (Brazil) Romario Tavora Britto
7. (Brazil) Rodrigo Cesar Barbosa
8. (Brazil) Julio Cesar Conceicao

== Pro Tour – Los Angeles (6–8 March 1998) ==
David Price won Pro Tour Los Angeles. In the finals he defeated Ben Rubin, who thus made it to the second place at his first Pro Tour attendance.

=== Tournament data ===
Prize pool: $151,635
Players: 342
Format: Block Constructed (Tempest)

=== Final standings ===
Place	Player	Prize	Comment
1	(United States) David Price	$25,000	
2	(United States) Ben Rubin	$15,000	First Pro Tour Attendance
3	(United States) David Bachmann	$10,000	
4	(United States) Adam Katz	$8,000	
5	(United States) Kyle Rose	$6,500	2nd Final day
6	(Czech Republic) Jakub Slemr	$5,500	2nd Final day
7	(Denmark) Svend Geertsen	$4,800	2nd Final day
8	(United States) Andrew Wolf	$4,300	

== Grand Prix – Stockholm ==
GP Stockholm (21–22 March)

1. (Sweden) Olle Råde
2. (Finland) Tuomo Nieminen
3. (Sweden) Johan Franzen
4. (Norway) Jan Pieter Groenhof
5. (France) Manuel Bevand
6. (Finland) Viktor Forsman
7. (Norway) Ole Bergesen
8. (Norway) Sigurd Eskeland

== Pro Tour – New York (17–19 April 1998) ==
In an all-American Top 8 Jon Finkel won his first Pro Tour. Mark Justice reached his fourth and as yet last final eight.

=== Tournament data ===
Prize pool: $151,635
Format: Booster Draft (Tempest-Stronghold)

=== Top 8 ===
Quarter-finals
1	Jon Finkel	3
8	Casey McCarrel	2
5	David Bachmann	3
4	Truc Bui	0
3	Dominic Crapuchettes	3
6	Nate Clark	0
7	Mark Justice	0
2	John Chinnock	3

Semi-finals
Jon Finkel	3
David Bachmann	2
Dominic Crapuchettes	3
John Chinnock	2

Finals
Jon Finkel	3
Dominic Crapuchettes	1

=== Final standings ===
Place	Player	Prize	Comment
1	(United States) Jon Finkel	$25,000	2nd Final day
2	(United States) Dominic Crapuchettes	$15,000	
3	(United States) John Chinnock	$10,000	3rd Final day
4	(United States) David Bachmann	$8,000	2nd Final day
5	(United States) Truc Bui	$6,500	2nd Final day
6	(United States) Nate Clark	$5,500	2nd Final day
7	(United States) Mark Justice	$4,800	4th Final day
8	(United States) Casey McCarrel	$4,300	

== Grand Prix – Atlanta, Antwerp, Zurich, Indianapolis ==
GP Atlanta (27–28 March)

1. (United States) Randy Buehler
2. (United States) Bob Coonce
3. (United States) David Mills
4. (United States) Derek Rank
5. (United States) Patrick Callahan
6. (United States) Ray Deguzman
7. (United States) Nate Clark
8. (United States) Chris Donahue

GP Indianapolis (27–28 June)

1. (United States) Eric Jordan
2. (United States) Koby Kennison
3. (United States) Michael Chiumento
4. (United States) Worth Wollpert
5. (United States) Randy Buehler
6. (United States) Michael Katz
7. Ryan Joe
8. (United States) Darwin Kastle

GP Antwerp (25–26 April)

1. (Germany) Stephan Valkyser
2. (Czech Republic) Lukas Ladra
3. (United States) Brian Hacker
4. (France) Michael Sochon
5. (United States) Randy Buehler
6. (Germany) Timo Meimberg
7. (Germany) Peer Kröger
8. (France) Michaël Debard

GP Zurich (30–31 May)

1. (United States) Steven O'Mahoney-Schwartz
2. (United States) Rudy Edwards
3. (France) Michaël Debard
4. (Switzerland) Alexander Blumke
5. (Germany) Janosch Kühn
6. (United States) Jon Finkel
7. (Germany) Marcel Baran
8. (Germany) Michael Huth

== 1998 World Championships – Seattle (12–16 August 1998) ==
Brian Selden defeated fellow American Ben Rubin to become the 1998 World Champion. He played a Control-Combo deck revolving around Survival of the Fittest. The Top 8 was one of the most star-studded final eights ever, with all players making at least one other Top 8 appearance, and four of them later becoming Hall of Famers.

The US national team, consisting of Matt Linde, Mike Long, Bryce Currence, and Jon Finkel won its third team title. Long thus won his third team title, too, as he had been precisely on those teams which had won the title.

=== Tournament data ===
Players: 203
Format: Standard, Rochester Draft (Mirage-Visions-Weatherlight), Extended Individual formats: Booster Draft (Tempest-Stronghold-Exodus), Standard, Tempest Block Constructed (Tempest, Stronghold, Exodus)
Team formats: 4-Person Team Sealed (4 5th Edition Starter + 4 5th Edition Booster) – Swiss; Constructed (2x Tempest Block Constructed + 2x Standard) – Finals

=== Top 8 ===
Quarter-finals
1	Jon Finkel	3
8	Alan Comer	0
5	Ben Rubin	3
4	Scott Johns	2
3	Brian Selden	3
6	Chris Pikula	1
7	Brian Hacker	2
2	Raphaël Lévy	3

Semi-finals
Jon Finkel	1
Ben Rubin	3
Brian Selden	3
Raphaël Lévy	1

Finals
Ben Rubin	1
Brian Selden	3

=== Final standings ===
Place	Player	Prize	Comment
1	(United States) Brian Selden	$34,000	Pro Tour debut
2	(United States) Ben Rubin	$22,000	2nd Final day
3	(United States) Jon Finkel	$16,000	3rd Final day
4	(France) Raphaël Lévy	$13,000	
5	(United States) Scott Johns	$11,000	4th Final day
6	(United States) Chris Pikula	$9,500	3rd Final day
7	(United States) Brian Hacker	$8,250	2nd Final day
8	(United States) Alan Comer	$7,250	2nd Final day

=== National team competition ===
1. United States (Matt Linde, Mike Long, Bryce Currence, Jon Finkel)
2. France (Pierre Malherbaud, Manuel Bevand, Marc Hernandez, Fabien Demazeau)

== Pro Player of the year final standings ==
After the World Championship Jon Finkel was awarded the Pro Player of the year title.

Rank	Player	Pro Points
1	(United States) Jon Finkel	87
2	(United States) Randy Buehler	70
3	(United States) Steven O'Mahoney-Schwartz	57
4	(United States) David Price	55
5	(United States) Matt Place	53
