= Wizards Play Network =

Sanctioning body for Wizards of the Coast games

- Abbreviation: WPN
- Established: 1993; 33 years ago
- Parent organization: Wizards of the Coast
- Website: wpn.wizards.com
- Formerly called: DCI, Duelists' Convocation International

The Wizards Play Network (WPN) is the official sanctioning body for competitive play in Magic: The Gathering (Magic) and various other games produced by Wizards of the Coast and its subsidiaries, such as Avalon Hill. Originally, it was known as the DCI (formerly Duelists' Convocation International) but was rebranded in 2008. The WPN provided game rules, tournament operating procedures, and other materials to private tournament organizers and players. It also operated a judge certification program to provide consistent rules enforcement and promote fair play. The DCI's name was still commonly used, however, to refer to the player registration number ("DCI number") until 2020.

== History ==
The former DCI logo.

The DCI was formed in late 1993, and developed Magic's first tournament sanctioning and deckbuilding rules. Over the next decades, it filled several roles in Magic's organized play. It maintained policy documents as changes were needed, addressed new questions and supported new product releases. It maintained the registration systems for both players and sanctioned tournaments. It also developed and operated a certification program for tournament officials, known as Judges.

Over time, the roles of the DCI were gradually absorbed by other organizations, such as Wizards of the Coast itself through its Wizards Play Network (WPN) program, or through the independent Judge Program. Part of the 2008 Wizards Play Network rebrand was "in response to feedback from organizers, particularly retailers". This also opened up Magic pre-release tournaments to participating WPN stores. Per the industry trade ICv2, the WPN was designed to include "a wider range of casual formats, including leagues, multi-player, and team play. Current sanctioned programs will remain; the new programs will be in addition to those that already exist"; previously, "the entire array of Magic organized play events was all one-on-one sanctioned tournament play". In May 2009, Wizards of the Coast announced that 138,500 active Magic players were registered in the new organized play program since launching the WPN.

Also in 2009, stores at the WPN Core level or higher were allowed to release Dungeons & Dragons (D&D) products before the official publication date. In 2010, Wizards of the Coast restricted organized play not associated with a participating store; many sanctioned Magic and D&D events were now required to be hosted at a participating store or sponsored by a participating store. Wizards of the Coast began to advertise the D&D Encounters program, a D&D equivalent of Friday Night Magic, under the WPN umbrella in 2010. From 2014 to 2016, the D&D Adventurers League could only be run at participating WPN locations. Scott Thorne, for ICv2 in 2014, wrote that the WPN organized play is highly structured with stores expected, or at least encouraged, to run OP events, either provided by WotC itself (Friday Night Magic, Magic Game Days, the late Kaijudo Draft program, D&D Encounters and so forth and so on), or set up by the store (Magic, casual Magic, casual Dungeons & Dragons). Stores can either schedule events weeks or months in advance, with promotional materials and support often provided (sometimes hundreds of dollars' worth of support), or set something up on the fly, as a group of players come in and settles down for an evening of Magic or D&D. The company has made the DCI Reporter software integral to its OP program and updates the software on a regular basis. The weekly sales tips sent out from Wizards' Customer Support usually (but not always) focus on how to enhance a store’s OP program as integral to the success of Magic and, to a lesser extent, Dungeons & Dragons.

In March 2020, due to the COVID-19 pandemic, Wizards of the Coast suspended in-store events in North America, Europe, and Latin America. In response to the in-person suspension, Wizards of the Coast launched the Friday Night Magic at Home program utilizing the online game Magic: The Gathering Arena. Then in October 2020, Wizards of the Coast announced a new ongoing ticketed series for Dungeons & Dragons called D&D Virtual Play Weekends which are organized by Baldman Games. This monthly event includes the option of either Adventurers League legal games or non-AL games. In May 2021, the in-store suspension was lifted in the United States, Japan and Africa but not in Latin America or Europe.

In 2024, WPN started a pilot program called "Avalon Hill Game Nights" which focuses on "evergreen titles that WotC is increasing availability for to WPN stores via distribution. These titles include the HeroQuest line, Betrayal at House on the Hill, The Yawning Portal, and Risk and Risk Strike". The pilot program is scheduled to begin in July 2024 at "200 WPN stores in the U.S. and Canada".

== WPN sanctioned events ==
In order to play in sanctioned events, players must register for membership. Previously, players would receive a DCI number. This number is up to 10 digits long, and uniquely identifies a competitor in a sanctioned tournament. In 2017, players were encouraged to create a Wizards Account which would include a player's DCI number. Starting in 2020, there was a transition to sanctioned events requiring a player to have a Wizards Account instead of a DCI number.

The WPN previously maintained a global player ratings database (formerly based on a variation of the Elo rating system; then based on "Planeswalker Points", earned for participating in events as well as for each win) and members had access to their entire tournament history online. However, in 2020, both the database and "Planeswalker Points" were retired. Newsweek reported that "your DCI number and the website that lets you track your tournament process back decades will be taken offline [...]. Players have been responding on reddit and Twitter to the removal of the archival with either disdain or acceptance". Epicstream commented that the "move to remove the old Planeswalker Points system is understandable. The Wizards Account and Companion app will simplify everything, and due to privacy laws, local game stores can no longer store local databases so each player will need to type the event into the app or give the organizer their Wizards Account email address".

If a member commits frequent or flagrant rules infractions, their membership can be suspended for variable amounts of time depending on the severity, from one month to lifetime.

=== Participating stores ===
The WPN outlines various rules participating stores must follow along with various metrics they must meet in order to stay in the WPN network. Since January 2018, Wizards of the Coast has required participating stores to pay for background checks (where legal) on employees or others involved in the administering of WPN events. Additionally, Wizards of the Coast made an explicit "requirement that WPN stores not employ staff or engage others whose names appear on a sex offender registry 'and/or have been convicted... for a violent sexual offense or a crime against children'." Milton Griepp, for the industry trade ICv2, commented that this change occurred after recent social media coverage on a Magic judge who "was discovered to be listed on a sex offenders registry. To make things worse, the situation had been reported to an email address maintained by Magic Judges, 'an independent community-run organization that operates and manages the judge community and the Judge Conduct Committee,' way back in July 2017".

Stores were previously divided into levels (Core, Advanced and Advanced Plus) and received different benefits based on their store level. Since 2019, stores are divided into WPN Stores and WPN Premium Stores ("about 5% of all WPN stores"). Metrics are measured by what WPN calls Tickets and Engaged Players. Tickets are "the total number of entries across all of a store’s Magic: The Gathering events" and Engaged Players are "players who join six events, in either Standard, Draft, or Sealed, per year". To stay in the WPN Network, stores must reach a minimum of 5 Engaged players and 250 Tickets per year. Stores will also receive player incentives, such as promo packs, based on their exact metrics.

Due to the COVID-19 pandemic, these metrics were suspended. However, Wizards of the Coast began encouraging WPN stores to run events again by resuming metric counts in July 2021. Jeffrey Dohm-Sanchez, for ICv2, highlighted that this metric rollout was limited to the US region with other regions to follow in the future. He wrote that "retailers will have an entire year to build up their metrics for allocations as a grace period, and during this time, allocations will either be based on the Q1 2020 or live metrics. After the grace period ends, the live metrics will determine allocations. It is also to be noted that all formats will now count towards the Engaged Players portion of the metrics. Prior to the pandemic, only Standard, Booster Draft and Sealed events counted towards this metric. Now, any form of Magic played in a retailer's community can contribute to the number of Engaged Players". Also in 2021, Wizards of the Coast required participating stores to transition from the Wizards Event Reporter (WER) to the Wizards EventLink system in order to stay in the WPN network as the WER was being decommissioned.

== Tournaments ==
=== Ranking ===
Until September 2011, the WPN maintained rules and assigned players ratings for three basic categories in Magic: Constructed, Eternal, and Limited. These categories recorded a player's ranking based on their records of wins and losses. A fourth rating category, Composite, was the average of a player's Constructed and Limited ratings. Starting in 2010, the WPN introduced a new rating category, called Total rating. This rating replaced most of the existing individual ratings. While the other ratings were still published, Total replaced the other categories for rating-based invitations and byes.

The rating system was discontinued in 2011 in favor of a points-based system, known as Planeswalker Points, administered by Wizards of the Coast. This system awarded points for participating in a tournament, as well as additional points for each win during the event. This system replaced the rating system for invitations and byes. In 2020, Planeswalker Points were retired.

=== Judge Program ===
The WPN was also the home of the Judge Program. Early in Magic's competitive history, the event's organizers needed a system for training and certifying qualified tournament officials. To have a measure of capability of the judges the WPN introduced judge levels. Over time the Judge Program grew and transformed, and is now an independent organization.

=== Friday Night Magic ===
"Thousands of games shops" participate in Friday Night Magic (FNM), an event sponsored by the WPN; it is advertised as "the event where new players can approach the game, and start building their community". FNM offers both sanctioned tournament formats and all casual formats. In 2018, The New Yorker reported that "even as it has grown in popularity and size, Magic flies low to the ground. It thrives on the people who gather at lunch tables, in apartments, or in one of the six thousand stores worldwide that Wizards has licensed to put on weekly tournaments dubbed Friday Night Magic". FNM tournaments can act as a stepping-stone to more competitive play.

=== Other tournaments ===
Pre-release tournaments are held in hundreds of locations around the world several days before each new expansion, or set, is available for sale in stores. The pre-release provides a casual play atmosphere and a preview of new cards and sets. Before 2008, pre-release tournaments were limited to those with Premier Tournament Organizer status; it was then opened up to WPN stores.

Friday Night Magic (FNM) tournaments and Arena Leagues (currently defunct) are offered in many stores and clubs, allowing players to compete for special foil promo cards and other prizes (rarely involving a cash top prize). These tournaments are mostly for amateurs and first-time players seeking a start in professional play. The WPN will also run other regional tournaments such as the 2021 Store Challenger Series for participating WPN stores in the APAC region.

Many other stores, school clubs, and community groups hold WPN-sanctioned events on a regular basis. Events are also held at almost all gaming conventions, such as Origins and Gen Con. In addition, some companies hold tournament series for Magic: The Gathering at locations across the US outside of WPN regulation.

== Hecatomb ==
Hecatomb was supported by the DCI over its short lifetime. In August 2006, it was announced that the game would no longer be produced by Wizards of the Coast, and the DCI ceased to support it.
