= Tsuyoshi Ikeda =

Japanese Magic: The Gathering player

Tsuyoshi Ikeda 池田 剛
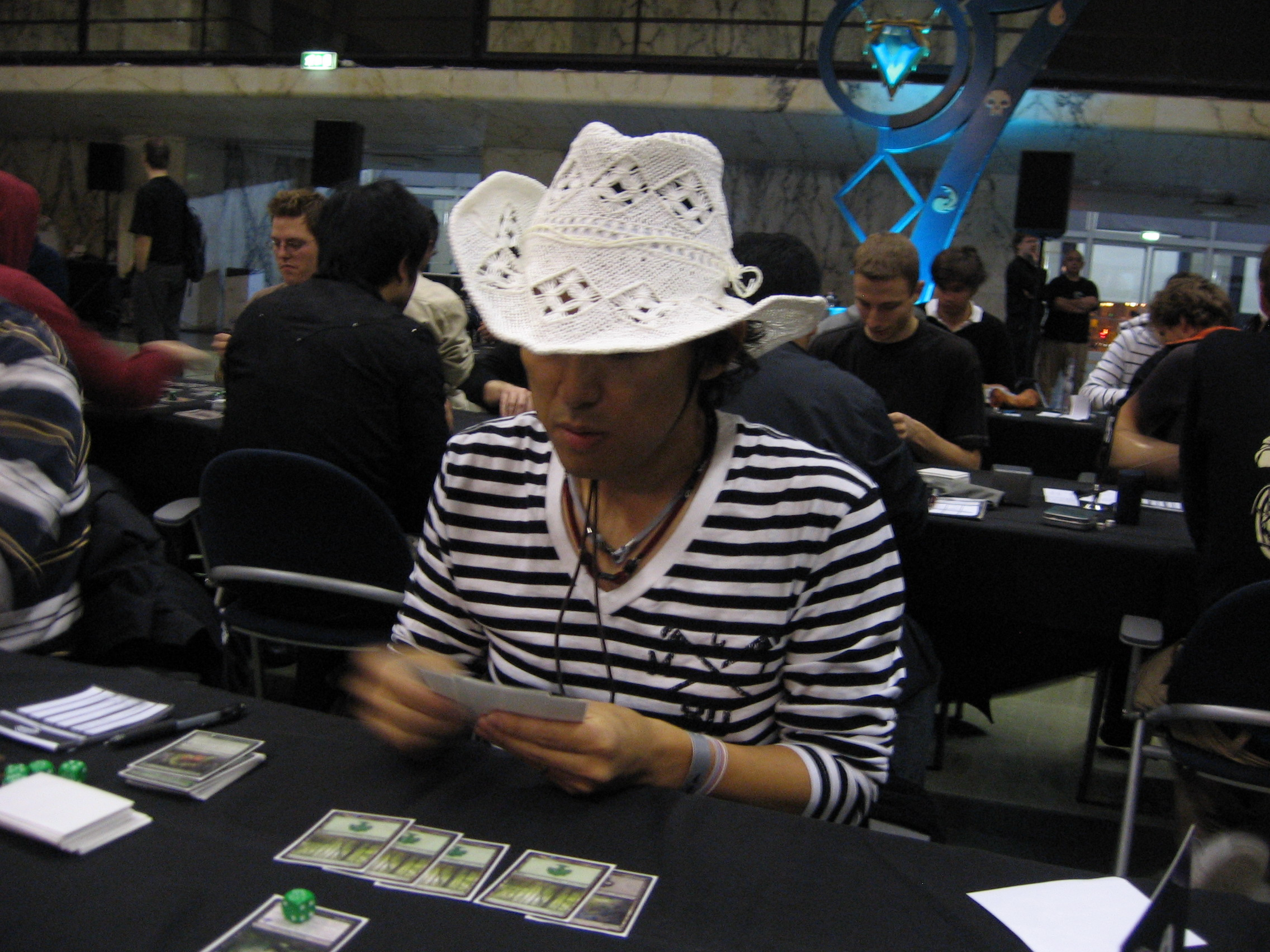
- Ikeda at 2009 Worlds with his trademark hat
- Nationality: Japanese
- Pro Tour debut: 1998 Pro Tour New York
- Winnings: US$81,334
- Pro Tour wins (Top 8): 0 (4)
- Grand Prix wins (Top 8): 1 (6)
- Lifetime Pro Points: 313
- Planeswalker Level: 47 (Archmage)

Tsuyoshi Ikeda (池田 剛) is a Japanese Magic: The Gathering player. His success include four top eights at the Pro Tour level, and six on the Grand Prix level, including one win. He is ranked 12th on lifetime pro points.

== Career ==
Tsuyoshi Ikeda began his Pro Tour career at Pro Tour New York in 1998. Over the next two seasons, he qualified for the occasional Pro Tour, but without much success. It wasn't until 2000 that Ikeda began to enjoy success in professional Magic. He finished fourth at Grand Prix Kuala Lumpur and played most of the Pro Tours that season. His success continued over the years that followed, with Ikeda making the top eight of one premier event each season from 2000-01 and 2005.

His breakout performance on the Pro Tour came at Pro Tour Yokohama in 2003. Ikeda made the top eight, and finished third, losing to countryman Masashi Oiso in the semifinals. The following season, Ikeda reached the finals of the team Pro Tour in Seattle. Alongside teammates Itaru Ishida and Jin Okomoto, Ikeda lost the finals to von Dutch, consisting of Jelger Wiegersma, Kamiel Cornelissen, and Jeroen Remie.

After 2005, Ikeda took a break from the game, only to come back in 2008 better than ever. After having top eighted two Grand Prix that season, Ikeda made his third Pro Tour top eight at the World Championship in Memphis, Tennessee. A semifinal loss to Jamie Parke saw him finish third.

Ikeda's renewed success continued through 2009. Ikeda won a premier level event for the first time that season at Grand Prix Niigata. To follow up on his win, Ikeda made another top eight at Pro Tour Austin. Like in Seattle five years earlier, Ikeda lost the finals again, this time to Brian Kibler.

== Achievements ==
Season	Event type	Location	Format	Date	Rank
1999–00	Grand Prix	Kuala Lumpur	Extended	3–5 March 2000	4
1999–00	Nationals	Tokyo	Special	27–28 May 2000	4
2000–01	Grand Prix	Yokohama	Team Limited	12–13 May 2001	4
2002–03	Pro Tour	Yokohama	Booster Draft	9–11 May 2003	3
2003–04	Pro Tour	Seattle	Team Limited	9–11 July 2004	2
2005	Grand Prix	Osaka	Team Limited	8–9 January 2005	2
2008	Grand Prix	Yokohama	Block Constructed	2–3 August 2008	8
2008	Grand Prix	Okayama	Sealed and Booster Draft	22–23 November 2008	4
2008	Worlds	Memphis	Special	11–14 December 2008	3
2009	Grand Prix	Niigata	Sealed and Booster Draft	29–30 August 2009	1
2009	Pro Tour	Austin	Extended and Booster Draft	16–18 October 2009	2
2010	Nationals	Kyoto	Standard and Booster Draft	2–4 July 2010	2

Last updated: 18 October 2009
Source: Wizards.com
