= Magic: The Gathering Pro Tour season 2008 =

13th season of the Magic: The Gathering Pro Tour

2008 Pro Tour season
- Pro Player of the Year: (Japan) Shuhei Nakamura
- Rookie of the Year: (Australia) Aaron Nicastri
- World Champion: (Finland) Antti Malin
- Pro Tours: 4
- Grands Prix: 21
- Hall of Fame inductions: Dirk Baberowski; Mike Turian; Jelger Wiegersma; Olivier Ruel; Ben Rubin
- Start of season: 15 December 2007
- End of season: 14 December 2008

The 2008 Pro Tour season was the thirteenth season of the Magic: The Gathering Pro Tour. It began on 15 December 2007, with Grand Prix Stuttgart, and ended on 14 December 2008, with the 2008 World Championship in Memphis. The season consisted of twenty-one Grand Prixs, and four Pro Tours, located in Kuala Lumpur, Hollywood, Berlin, and Memphis. The Grand Prixs from June until August were designated Summer Series Grand Prixs, awarding more prizes and additional Pro Points. At the end of the season, Shuhei Nakamura became the fourth consecutive Japanese player to win Pro Player of the year. Dirk Baberowski, Michael Turian, Jelger Wiegersma, Olivier Ruel, and Ben Rubin were inducted into the Hall of Fame.

== Grand Prix – Stuttgart ==
GP Stuttgart (15–16 December 2007)

- Format: Limited
- Attendance: 1336
1. (Japan) Shuhei Nakamura
2. (Netherlands) Robert van Medevoort
3. (Sweden) Jonathan Bergström
4. (Germany) Raul Porojan
5. (Spain) Joel Calafell
6. (Belgium) Fried Meulders
7. (Italy) Patrizio Golia
8. (Germany) Marc Vogt

== Pro Tour – Kuala Lumpur (15–17 February 2008) ==
Jon Finkel of the US won Kuala Lumpur, becoming the first Hall of Fame member to do so after his induction. The top eight is considered to be one of the best ever, with the players having a total of six Pro Tour wins between them prior to Kuala Lumpur.

=== Tournament data ===
Prize pool: $230,795
Players: 346
Format: Booster Draft (Lorwyn-Morningtide)
Head Judge: Toby Elliott

=== Top 8 ===
Quarter-finals
1	Nicolai Herzog	2
8	Marcio Carvalho	3
4	Jon Finkel	3
5	Guillaume Wafo-Tapa	0
2	Mario Pascoli	3
7	Mike Hron	0
3	Ming Xu	3
6	Joel Calafell	1

Semi-finals
Marcio Carvalho	1
Jon Finkel	3
Mario Pascoli	3
Ming Xu	2

Finals
Jon Finkel	3
Mario Pascoli	1

=== Final standings ===
Place	Player	Prize	Pro Points	Comment
1	(United States) Jon Finkel	$40,000	25	12th Final day, 3rd Pro Tour win
2	(Italy) Mario Pascoli	$20,000	20	
3	(Portugal) Marcio Carvalho	$15,000	16	2nd Final day
4	(China) Ming Xu	$13,000	16	1st Chinese Player in a Top 8, Pro Tour debut
5	(France) Guillaume Wafo-Tapa	$11,000	12	2nd Final day
6	(United States) Mike Hron	$10,500	12	2nd Final day
7	(Spain) Joel Calafell	$10,000	12	
8	(Norway) Nicolai Herzog	$9,500	12	5th Final day

== Grand Prixs – Vancouver, Shizuoka, Vienna, Philadelphia, Brussels ==
GP Vancouver (23–24 February)

- Format: Extended
- Attendance: 395
1. (United States) Paul Cheon
2. (United States) Ben Lundquist
3. (Canada) Marc Bonnefoy
4. (United States) Zack Hall
5. (Canada) Jason Fleurant
6. (United States) Michael Guerney
7. (Canada) Aaron Paquette
8. Hunter Coale

GP Philadelphia (15–16 March)

- Format: Extended
- Attendance: 969
1. (United States) Gerard Fabiano
2. (United States) Adam Yurchick
3. (United States) Luis Scott-Vargas
4. (United States) Tyler Mantey
5. (Lebanon) Paul Mathews
6. (United States) Ben Wienburg
7. (United States) Matt Hansen
8. (United States) Jonathan Sonne

GP Shizuoka (8–9 March)

- Format: Standard
- Attendance: 827
1. (Japan) Yuuta Takahashi
2. (France) Olivier Ruel
3. (Japan) Kenji Tsumura
4. (Japan) Ryousuke Masuno
5. (Japan) Kazuya Mitamura
6. (Japan) Shintarou Ishimura
7. (Japan) Taichi Fujimoto
8. (Japan) Akira Asahara

GP Brussels (3–4 May)

- Format: Limited
- Attendance: 1430
1. (Netherlands) Kamiel Cornelissen
2. (France) Gabriel Nassif
3. (France) Raphaël Lévy
4. (France) Antoine Ruel
5. (France) Gaetan Lefebvre
6. (Netherlands) Rogier Kleij
7. (Germany) Holger Lange
8. (France) Alexandre Peset

GP Vienna (15–16 March)

- Format: Extended
- Attendance: 1154
1. (Poland) Mateusz Kopec
2. (Austria) Nikolaus Eigner
3. (Croatia) Matija Vlahovic
4. (Japan) Tomoharu Saitou
5. (Italy) Gianluca Bevere
6. (Austria) Horst Winkelmann
7. (Poland) Wojciech Zuber
8. (Hungary) Andras Nagy

== Pro Tour Hollywood (23–25 May 2008) ==
Charles Gindy became the second American to win a Pro Tour in the 2008 season. Playing a green-black elf/rock deck, he defeated Germany's Jan Ruess, playing merfolk, in the finals.

=== Tournament data ===
Prize pool: $230,795
Players: 371
Format: Standard
Head Judge: Sheldon Menery

=== Top 8 ===
Quarter-finals
1	Shuhei Nakamura	3
8	Paulo Vitor Damo da Rosa	2
4	Jan Ruess	3
5	Makihito Mihara	2
2	Nico Bohny	2
7	Charles Gindy	3
3	Marijn Lybaert	0
6	Yong Han Choo	3

Semi-finals
Shuhei Nakamura	1
Jan Ruess	3
Charles Gindy	3
Yong Han Choo	2

Finals
Jan Ruess	0
Charles Gindy	3

=== Final standings ===
Place	Player	Prize	Pro Points	Comment
1	(United States) Charles Gindy	$40,000	25	
2	(Germany) Jan Ruess	$20,000	20	
3	(Japan) Shuhei Nakamura	$15,000	16	5th Final day
4	(Singapore) Yong Han Choo	$13,000	16	
5	(Switzerland) Nico Bohny	$11,000	12	
6	(Japan) Makihito Mihara	$10,500	12	3rd Final day
7	(Belgium) Marijn Lybaert	$10,000	12	2nd Final day
8	(Brazil) Paulo Vitor Damo da Rosa	$9,500	12	3rd Final day

== Grand Prixs – Birmingham, Indianapolis, Buenos Aires, Madrid, Kobe, Denver, Copenhagen, Manila, Rimini, Kansas City, Paris ==
GP Birmingham (30 May – 1 June)

- Format: Block Constructed
- Attendance: 581
1. (Hong Kong) Lee Shi Tian
2. (France) Remi Fortier
3. (France) Raphaël Lévy
4. (Netherlands) Jelger Wiegersma
5. (Finland) Antti Malin
6. (Switzerland) Matthias Künzler
7. (Switzerland) Manuel Bucher
8. (England) Jonathan Randle

GP Summer Series Indianapolis (21–22 June)

- Format: Limited
- Attendance: 1124
1. (Netherlands) Jelger Wiegersma
2. (Lithuania) Gaudenis Vidugiris
3. (United States) Jamie Parke
4. (United States) Tyler Mantey
5. (United States) James Beltz
6. (United States) Eric Franklin
7. (United States) Randy Wright
8. (United States) Ben Rasmussen

GP Summer Series Buenos Aires (28–29 June)

- Format: Standard
- Attendance: 580
1. (Brazil) Francisco Braga
2. (Brazil) Felipe Alves Pellegrini
3. (Brazil) Adrien Degaspare
4. (Argentina) Damian Buckley
5. (Brazil) Ivan Taroshi Fox
6. (France) Olivier Ruel
7. (Argentina) Nicolas Bevacqua
8. (Argentina) Sebastian Pozzo

GP Summer Series Madrid (26–27 July)

- Format: Limited
- Attendance: 1465
1. (Denmark) Lasse Nørgaard
2. (Spain) Daniel Martin Bermejo
3. (Switzerland) Manuel Bucher
4. (France) Romain Fenaux-briot
5. (Denmark) Allan Christensen
6. (Spain) Sergio Salas Martinez
7. (Switzerland) Tommi Lindgren
8. (Norway) Geir Bakke

GP Summer Series Kobe (2–3 August)

- Format: Block Constructed
- Attendance: 811
1. (Japan) Yuuta Takahashi
2. (Japan) Takayuki Takagi
3. (Japan) Masaya Tanahashi
4. (Japan) Shou Yoshimori
5. (Japan) Hirosi Yosida
6. (Japan) Katsuya Ueda
7. (Japan) Koutarou Ootsuka
8. (Japan) Tsuyoshi Ikeda

GP Summer Series Denver (9–10 August)

- Format: Block Constructed
- Attendance: 625
1. (United States) Gerry Thompson
2. (United States) Lee Steht
3. (United States) Nathan Elkins
4. Kenneth Castor
5. (United States) A.J. Sacher
6. (United States) Kyle Bundgaard
7. (United States) Antonino De Rosa
8. (United States) Hunter Burton

GP Summer Series Copenhagen (23–24 August)

- Format: Standard
- Attendance: 610
1. (Sweden) David Larsson
2. (Japan) Tomoharu Saitou
3. (Czech Republic) Jakub Jahoda
4. (Japan) Shuhei Nakamura
5. (France) Guillaume Wafo-Tapa
6. (Italy) William Cavaglieri
7. (Austria) Philipp Summereder
8. (Netherlands) Robert Van Meedevort

GP Summer Series Manila (30–31 August)

- Format: Block Constructed
- Attendance: 641
1. (Japan) Hironobu Sugaya
2. (Japan) Shouta Yasooka
3. (Philippines) Luis Magisa
4. (Japan) Shingou Kurihara
5. (Japan) Masami Kaneko
6. (Japan) Koutarou Ootsuka
7. (France) Raphaël Lévy
8. (Malaysia) Wai Keat Ken Lim

GP Rimini (13–14 September)

- Format: Block Constructed
- Attendance: 686
1. (Italy) Emanuele Giusti
2. (Japan) Shuhei Nakamura
3. (Italy) Claudio Salemi
4. (Italy) Marcello Calvetto
5. (Switzerland) Matthias Künzler
6. (Spain) Rodrigo Renedo
7. (Spain) Joel Calafell
8. (Czech Republic) Petr Nahodil

GP Paris (18–19 October)

- Format: Limited
- Attendance: 1838
1. (Netherlands) Arjan van Leeuwen
2. (Belgium) Pierre Rensonnet
3. (Netherlands) Menno Dolstra
4. (Germany) Simon Görtzen
5. (Netherlands) Niels Noorlander
6. (France) Romain Lisciandro
7. (Poland) Artur Cnotalski
8. (Belgium) Jan De Coster

GP Kansas City (18–19 October)

- Format: Limited
- Attendance: 746
1. (United States) Tim Landale
2. (Brazil) Carlos Romão
3. (United States) Jonathan Sonne
4. (United States) Sammy Batarseh
5. (United States) Brandon Scheel
6. (United States) Justin Meyer
7. (United States) Chris Pait
8. (Brazil) Willy Edel

== Pro Tour Berlin (31 October – 2 November 2008) ==
Luis Scott-Vargas of the US, defeated Matej Zatlkaj in the finals of Pro Tour Berlin. Six of the eight quarter finalists, including all four semi-finalists, played variants on the Elf-Ball combo deck.

=== Tournament data ===
Prize pool: $230,795
Players: 454
Format: Extended
Head Judge: Sheldon Menery

=== Top 8 ===
Quarter-finals
1	Kenny Öberg	2
8	Luis Scott-Vargas	3
4	Tomoharu Saitou	3
5	Jan Doise	1
2	Martin Juza	2
7	Sebastian Thaler	3
3	Denis Sinner	2
6	Matej Zatlkaj	3

Semi-finals
Luis Scott-Vargas	3
Tomoharu Saitou	2
Sebastian Thaler	1
Matej Zatlkaj	3

Finals
Luis Scott-Vargas	3
Matej Zatlkaj	0

=== Final standings ===
Place	Player	Prize	Pro Points	Comment
1	(United States) Luis Scott-Vargas	$40,000	25	
2	(Slovakia) Matej Zatlkaj	$20,000	20	
3	(Japan) Tomoharu Saitou	$15,000	16	5th Final day
4	(Germany) Sebastian Thaler	$13,000	16	2nd Final day
5	(Sweden) Kenny Öberg	$11,000	12	
6	(Czech Republic) Martin Juza	$10,500	12	
7	(Germany) Denis Sinner	$10,000	12	
8	(Belgium) Jan Doise	$9,500	12	

== Grand Prixs – Atlanta, Okoyama, Taipei, Auckland ==
GP Atlanta (15–16 November)

- Format: Limited
- Attendance: 684
1. (United States) Luis Scott-Vargas
2. (United States) Gerry Thompson
3. (United States) Chris Fennell
4. (United States) Steven Wolansky
5. (United States) Brett Piazza
6. (Japan) Tomoharu Saitou
7. (United States) Chris Pait
8. (United States) Ken Adams

GP Taipei (29–30 November)

- Format: Limited
- Attendance: 270
1. (Japan) Shu Komuro
2. (Japan) Yoshitaka Nakano
3. (Japan) Osamu Fujita
4. (Taiwan) Homg Gi Tsai
5. (Taiwan) Tun Min Huang
6. (Taiwan) Sheng Xiu Jian
7. (Hong Kong) Lee Shi Tian
8. (Taiwan) Kang Nien Chiang

GP Okoyama (22–23 November)

- Format: Limited
- Attendance: 635
1. (Japan) Makihito Mihara
2. (Japan) Kazuya Mitamura
3. (Japan) Chikara Nakajima
4. (Japan) Tsuyoshi Ikeda
5. (Japan) Daisuke Muramatsu
6. (France) Olivier Ruel
7. (Japan) Akimasa Yamamoto
8. (France) Guillaume Wafo-Tapa

GP Auckland (6–7 December)

- Format: Limited
- Attendance: 254
1. (Australia) Dominic Lo
2. (New Zealand) Nick Tung
3. (Australia) Justin Cheung
4. (New Zealand) Jason Chung
5. (France) Olivier Ruel
6. (United States) Joseph Combs
7. (Australia) Basam Tabet
8. (New Zealand) Chris Hay

== 2008 World Championships – Memphis (11–14 December 2008) ==
The World Championships began with the induction of Dirk Baberowski, Michael Turian, Jelger Wiegersma, Olivier Ruel, and Ben Rubin, into the Hall of Fame. In the individual competition, Antti Malin of Finland emerged as the World Champion from a top eight including only one player without a prior Sunday appearance. In the team competition, it was the first time that the top four teams would play on Sunday, as opposed to only the top two. The US team defeated Australia in the finals.

=== Tournament data ===
Prize pool: $245,245 (individual) + $192,425 (national teams)
Players: 329
Formats: Standard, Booster Draft (Shards of Alara), Extended
Head Judge: Toby Elliott

=== Top 8 ===
Quarter-finals
1	Paulo Vitor Damo da Rosa	2
8	Jamie Parke	3
4	Frank Karsten	0
5	Tsuyoshi Ikeda	3
2	Antti Malin	3
7	Akira Asahara	1
3	Kenji Tsumura	2
6	Hannes Kerem	3

Semi-finals
Jamie Parke	3
Tsuyoshi Ikeda	0
Antti Malin	3
Hannes Kerem	2

Finals
Jamie Parke	1
Antti Malin	3

=== Final standings ===
Place	Player	Prize	Pro Points	Comment
1	(Finland) Antti Malin	$45,000	25	2nd Final day
2	(United States) Jamie Parke	$24,000	20	2nd Final day
3	(Japan) Tsuyoshi Ikeda	$15,000	16	3rd Final day
4	(Estonia) Hannes Kerem	$14,000	16	1st player from Estonia to Top Eight
5	(Brazil) Paulo Vitor Damo da Rosa	$11,000	12	4th Final day
6	(Japan) Kenji Tsumura	$10,500	12	6th Final day
7	(Netherlands) Frank Karsten	$10,000	12	3rd Final day
8	(Japan) Akira Asahara	$9,500	12	2nd Final day

=== National team competition ===
1. United States (Michael Jacob, Paul Cheon, Sam Black)
2. Australia (Aaron Nicastri, Brandon Lau, Justin Cheung)
3. Brazil (Willy Edel, Vagner Casatti, Luiz Guilherme de Michielli)
4. Japan (Masashi Oiso, Yuuya Watanabe, Akihiro Takakuwa)

== Pro Player of the year final standings ==
After the World Championship, Shuhei Nakamura was awarded the Pro Player of the year title, making Japan the first country to win the title in four consecutive years.

Rank	Player	Pro Points
1	(Japan) Shuhei Nakamura	70
2	(France) Olivier Ruel	58
2	(United States) Luis Scott-Vargas	58
4	(Portugal) Marcio Carvalho	50
4	(Japan) Tomoharu Saitou	50

== Performance by country ==
Japan had the most Top 8 appearances at 6 although they had less than half as many players on the Pro Tour in the season than the United States, which had the secondmost Top 8 appearances at 5.

Country	T8	Q	Q/T8	M	GT	Best Player (PPts)
Japan	6	154	26	155.5	19	Shuhei Nakamura (70)
United States	5	347	69	196.5	16	Luis Scott-Vargas (58)
Germany	3	74	25	208	3	Jan Ruess (35)
Belgium	2	30	15	158.5	3	Marijn Lybaert (33)
Brazil	2	28	14	185.5	4	Paulo Vitor Damo da Rosa (42)
France	1	90	90	183.5	6	Olivier Ruel (58)
Italy	1	74	74	230	3	Mario Pascoli (40)
Spain	1	53	53	224	1	Joel Calafell (33)

T8 = Number of players from that country appearing in a Pro Tour Top 8; Q = Number of players from that country participating in Pro Tours; M = Median finish over all PTs; GT = Gravy Trainers (aka players with a Pro Players Club level of 4 or more) from that country created in the 2009 season; Best Player (PPts) = Player with the most Pro Points from that country, Pro Points of that player in brackets.
