= Antti Malin =

Finnish Magic: The Gathering player (born 1983)

Antti E Malin
- Born: February 17, 1983 (age 43)
- Nationality: Finnish
- Pro Tour debut: 2001 Pro Tour Barcelona
- Winnings: US$95,030
- Pro Tour wins (Top 8): 1 (2)
- Grand Prix wins (Top 8): 0 (1)
- Median Pro Tour Finish: 102
- Lifetime Pro Points: 152
- Planeswalker Level: 46 (Archmage)

Antti Malin (born February 17, 1983) is a Finnish Magic: The Gathering player. Malin won the World Championship of the game in December 2008 in Memphis, Tennessee, United States. He is from the capital of Finland, Helsinki.

Malin is a long-time active scout, and has served as a board member in both local and national scouting organizations. Malin has studied at the Helsinki Business Polytechnic (Helia).

== Magic: The Gathering TCG ==
=== Accomplishments ===
Season	Event type	Location	Format	Date	Rank
2005	Pro Tour	London	Booster Draft	8-10 July 2005	4
2008	Grand Prix	Birmingham, England	Block Constructed	30 May-1 June 2008	5
2008	Worlds	Memphis	Special	11-14 December 2008	1

Last updated: 5 September 2011
Source: Event Coverage at Wizards.com

Preceded by (Israel) Uri Peleg	Magic World Champion; 2008	Succeeded by (Portugal) André Coimbra
