= Master Classics of Poker =

Poker tournament in Netherlands

- Current season, competition or edition: 2023
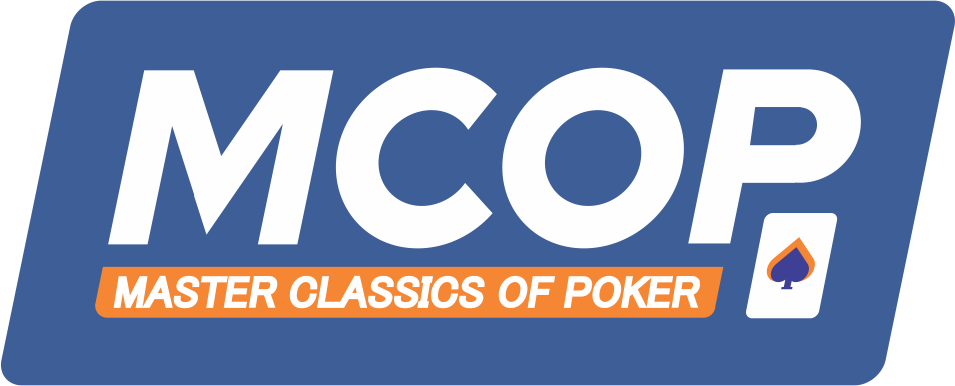
- Game: Poker
- Founded: 1992
- Owner: Holland Casino
- Continent: Europe
- Most recent champion: (Finland) Tommi Lankinen (2023)
- Website: masterclassicsofpoker.com

Notes
- First Champion (Netherlands) Eng Angh (1992); MCOP applies TDA rules

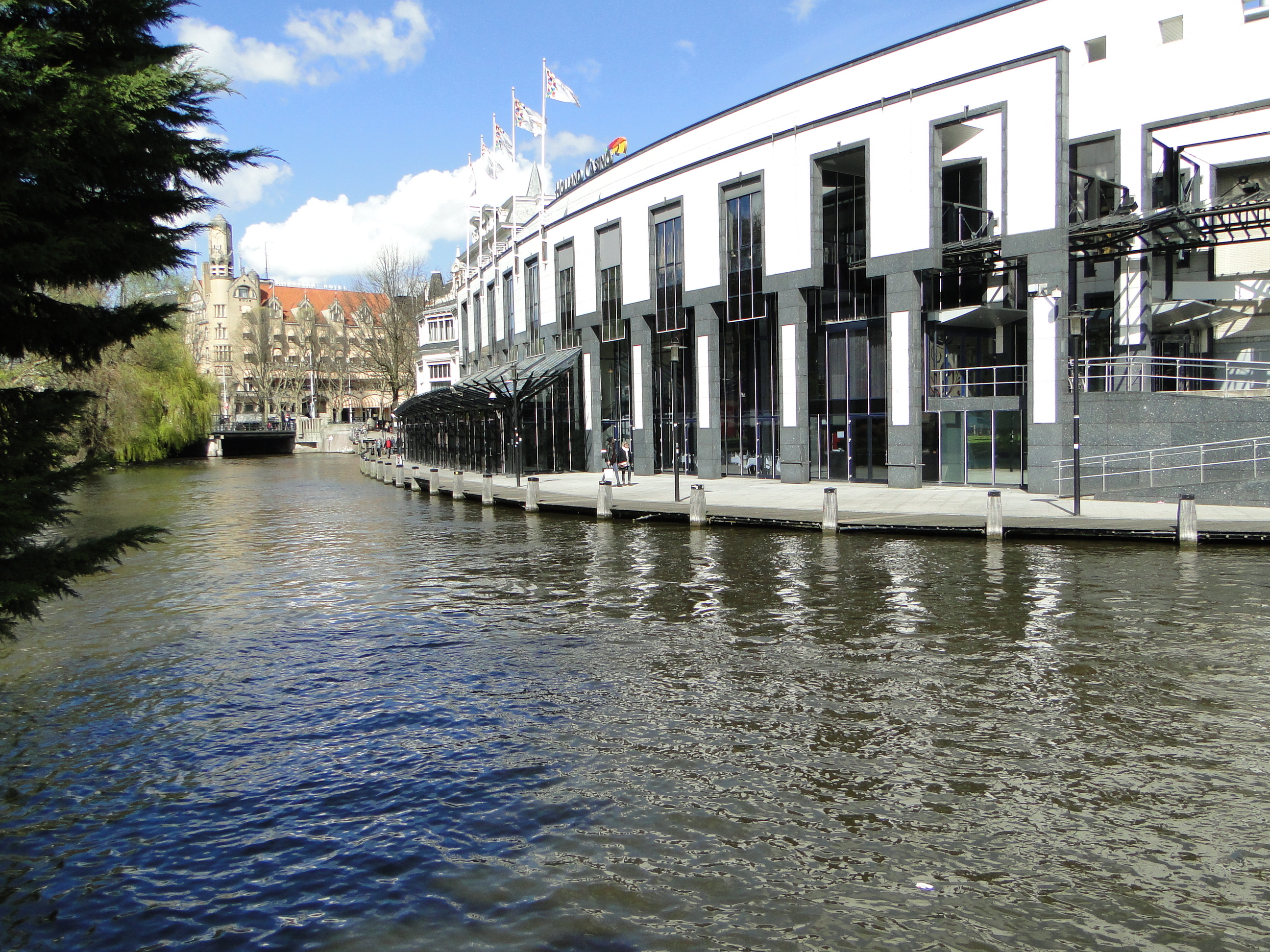
Holland Casino Amsterdam Centrum

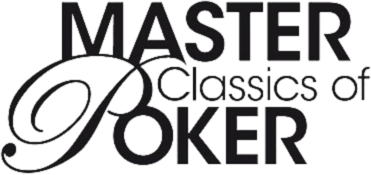
Master Classics of Poker 1992–2022

The Master Classics of Poker is one of the longest-standing poker festivals not only in Europe but around the world. The festival began with humble beginnings in 1992 with a small Seven-card stud event won by a local poker player Eng Angh for ƒ18,600 (€8,749).

== History ==
The year was 1991, at that time poker was not so well known in Amsterdam or almost all of Europe, that was when Ron Pool working for the Headquarter asked Jan Rodrigo, at the time of Holland Casino, Amsterdam City centre, and Peter Voolstra, Duty Manager at Holland Casino and who later he would become Tournament Director of the Master Classics of Poker (MCOP), he wanted to know more about what this game was that they talked about so much. In the same year they went to Las Vegas (US) and got in touch with Doug Dalton, who at the time worked at The Mirage casino, to understand a little more about poker tournaments. Doug agreed to show what the tournaments were like and even traveled to Amsterdam with his wife Edna to train the dealers. In a short time, poker became well known in Amsterdam due to the Holland casino, which for a long time was the only place where poker could be played legally in Europe.

The first Master Classics of Poker (MCOP) took place in November 1992, as Edna and Doug Dalton were in Amsterdam and could help with the event, from then on the event always takes place in the first week of November. In 1992 it was a Seven-card stud event whose champion was the Dutchman Eng Angh, winning a prize of ƒ18,600 (~$10,449). In 1993, they had several tournaments in different modalities, such as No Limit Hold'em, No Limit Seven-card stud, Limit Hold'em and Limit Seven-card stud and had registration between ƒ200 (~$105) and ƒ2,000 (~$1,050).

Between 1993 and 1998 there was no main event, it was only in 1999 that a tournament was created in the event schedule that would crown the Master Classics of Poker (MCOP) champion, the same as what happens nowadays in all world series, having a main tournament, the most prestigious and several parallel tournaments. As there was no main event, there was confusion as to who was the MCOP champion each year at the beginning, as the No Limit Hold'em event was not always the one that attracted the most players, which is why in 1994 the tournament that attracted the most players was Seven-card stud, won by the Dutchman Gerard Dreskens, who by many was considered the first great MCOP champion, but later, seeing the records, the players, together with the organization decided on the champion of the Limit Hold'em tournament as the champion of each year, making Englishman Surinder Sunar crowned the Master Classics of Poker (MCOP) champion in 1993.

Between 1992 and 2000, the official currency of MCOP was the Florin (ƒ), and from 2001 onwards the official currency changed to the Euro (€).

Since 1992, MCOP takes place annually in November and only in 2020 due to COVID-19 was there no MCOP.

In 2021, Pieter Boers (Director of Gaming & Services at Holland Casino) announced the return of MCOP.

== MCOP Main Event winners ==
Event / Buy-in / Date	Players	Prize Pool	Winner	Prize	Results
(Netherlands) MCOP 2025 €2,750 + 250 = November 14–22	427	€1,150,765	(Hong Kong) Timothy Chung	€203,800	
(Netherlands) MCOP 2024 €2,750 + 250 = November 15–23	427	€1,150,765	(Finland) Eero Abbey	€203,800	
(Netherlands) MCOP 2023 €2,750 + 250 = November 10–18	469	€1,276,852	(Finland) Tommi Lankinen	€218,714	
(Netherlands) MCOP 2022 €2,750 + 250 = November 18–26	498	€1,355,805	(France) Julien Sitbon	€237,808	
(Netherlands) MCOP 2021 €2,000 + 200 = November 13–21	340	€666,400	(Netherlands) Bas de Laat	€126,883*	
(Netherlands) MCOP 2020; November 20–29	Cancelled due COVID-19 restrictions.				
(Netherlands) MCOP 2019 €4,000 + 300 = November 22- December 1	346	€1,370,155	(Netherlands) Kevin Paqué	€260,878	
(Netherlands) MCOP 2018 €4,000 + 300 = November 21- December 1	294	€1,164,240	(Netherlands) Alberto Stegeman	€240,183	
(Netherlands) MCOP 2017 €4,000 + 300 = November 15–25	285	€1,128,594	(Germany) Claas Segebrecht	€235,087	
(Netherlands) MCOP 2016 €4,000 + 250 = November 12–26	356	€1,409,760	(Netherlands) Hakim Zoufri	€275,608	
(Netherlands) MCOP 2015 €4,000 + 250 = November 13–21	291	€1,154,193	(Finland) Jussi Nevanlinna	€300,000	
(Netherlands) MCOP 2014 €4,000 + 250 = November 21–29	298	€1,180,080	(Netherlands) Ruben Visser	€225,000*	
(Netherlands) MCOP 2013 €4,000 + 250 = November 9–16	298	€1,180,080	(Netherlands) Noah Boeken	€306,821	
(Netherlands) MCOP 2012 €5,000 + 250 = November 3–10	212	€1,060,000	(Germany) Ole Schemion	€286,200	
(Netherlands) MCOP 2011 Dutch Open €5,000 = November 5–12	298	€1,470,000	(Netherlands) David Boyaciyan	€382,200	
(Netherlands) MCOP 2010 €6,000 = November 5–13	249	€1,494,000	(Norway) Marcel Bjerkmann	€403,380	
(Netherlands) MCOP 2009 Lido International Dutch Open €6,000 + 200 = November 6–14	342	€2,052,000	(Sweden) Kristoffer Thorsson	€636,120	
(Netherlands) MCOP 2008 €6,000 + 200 = November 7–15	335	€2,010,000	(Denmark) Jan Vang Sørensen	€623,100	
(Netherlands) MCOP 2007 €5,000 + 100 = November 2–10	428	€2,140,000	(Norway) Trond Eidsvig	€620,600	
(Netherlands) MCOP 2006 LIDO Dutch Open €5,000 = November 3–11	345	€1,707,550	(Germany) Ali Jalali	€700,000	
(Netherlands) MCOP 2005 €5,000 = November 4–12	264	€1,320,000	(Norway) Thomas Middelthon	€528,000	
(Netherlands) MCOP 2004 LIDO Championship €5,000 = November 6–13	188	€980,000	(United States) Robert Mizrachi	€372,240	
(Netherlands) MCOP 2003 LIDO €3,020 = November 2–8	205	€651,000	(Sweden) Johan Storakers	€243,540	
(Netherlands) MCOP 2002 LIDO €3,020 = November 3–9	198	€630,000	(China) Angelo Zuoping Yu	€168,000	
(Netherlands) MCOP 2001 LIDO International ƒ5,040 (~$2,071) = November 3–11	170	ƒ850,000 (~$349,301)	(England) Graham Hiew	ƒ336,600 (~$138,323)	
(Netherlands) MCOP 2000 LIDO Tournament ƒ5,000 (~$1,942) = November 5–12	189	ƒ795,000 (~$308,770)	(England) Steve Liu	ƒ314,820 (~$122,273)	
(Netherlands) Master Classics Of Poker 1999 LIDO ƒ5,000 (~$2,360) = November 7–13	135	ƒ668,250 (~$315,429)	(England) Ram Vaswani	ƒ276,300 (~$130,420)	
(Netherlands) Master Classics Of Poker 1998 ƒ5,000 (~$2,644) = November 1–7	125	ƒ618,750 (~$327,156)	(England) Asher Derei	ƒ247,500 (~$130,862)	
(Netherlands) Master Classics Of Poker 1997 ƒ5,000 (~$2,568) = November	90	ƒ450,000 (~$231,101)	(Germany) Bjorn Janson	ƒ178,200 (~$91,516)	
(Netherlands) European Masterclassics of Poker 1996 ƒ1,000 (~$590) = November	122+ 83R	ƒ202,950 (~$119,593)	(Republic of Ireland) Mike Magee	ƒ80,360 (~$47,354)	
(Netherlands) Master Classics of Poker 1995 ƒ1,000 (~$461) = November 4–10	96+ 66R	ƒ160,380 (~$102,844)	(Netherlands) Belinda Blokker	ƒ84,909 (~$54,448)	
(Netherlands) Master Classics of Poker 1994 ƒ1,075 (~$632) = November 7–12	109	ƒ107,910 (~$63,421)	(United States) G Hawass	ƒ56,050 (~$32,942)	
(Netherlands) Master Classics of Poker 1993 ƒ2,000 (~$1,055) = November	38	ƒ76,000 (~$40,109)	(England) Surinder Sunar	ƒ41,800 (~$22,060)	
(Netherlands) Master Classics of Poker 1992 ƒ1,000 (~$577) = Seven-card stud = November			(Netherlands) Eng Angh	ƒ18,600 (~$10,727)	

== MCOP High Roller winners ==
Event / Buy-in / Date	Players	Prize Pool	Winner	Prize	Results
(Netherlands) 2024 High Roller 8-Max €10,000 + 300 = November 21–22	24	€235,200	(Netherlands) Joris Ruijs	€102,850	
(Netherlands) 2024 High Roller PLO 6-Max €10,000 + 300 = November 14-15	23	€225,400	(Netherlands) Nino Pansier	€101,430	
(Netherlands) 2024 High Roller 8-Max €6,000 + 300 = November 22–23	45	€264,600	(Finland) Roope Tarmi	€102,850	
(Netherlands) 2023 High Roller Mystery Bounty €2,000 + 300 + 2,000 = November 12–13	74 + 21 Reentries	€186,200 + €190,000 Bounty	(Netherlands) Raoul Kanme	€48,393 + €98,000 Bounty	
(Netherlands) 2022 8 Max High Roller €5,700 + 300 = November 25–26	58	€327,294	(Netherlands) Duco Haven	€111,509	
(Netherlands) 2019 High Roller €9,500 + 300 = November 29–30	45	€423,226	(Netherlands) Jorryt van Hoof	€164,508	
(Netherlands) 2018 High Roller Re-Entry €10,000 + 300 = November 29 – December 1	68	€673,202	(Netherlands) Hakim Zoufri	€215,761	
(Netherlands) 2017 High Roller €10,000 + 300 = November 23–25	65	€643,500	(Netherlands) Joris Ruijs	€206,242	
(Netherlands) 2016 Super High Roller €25,000 + 250 = November 17	13	€321,750	(Germany) Ole Schemion	€160,875	
(Netherlands) 2016 High Roller 8 Max €10,000 + 300 = November 20	74	€732,604	(Netherlands) Noah Boeken	€217,069	
(Netherlands) 2015 High Roller Re-entry €10,000 + 250 = November 15–16	44	€435,600	(England) Kuljinder Sidhu	€161,172	
(Netherlands) 2014 High Roller Re-entry €10,000 + 250 = November 23	38	€376,200	(Netherlands) Rachid Ben Cherif	€139,164	
(Netherlands) 2013 High Roller €10,000 + 250 = November 15–16	26	€257,400	(United States) Bryn Kenney	€102,960	
(Netherlands) 2012 High Roller €10,000 + 250 = November 6	40	€400,000	(Netherlands) Florens Feenstra	€148,000	
(Netherlands) 2011 High Roller €10,000 + 250 = November 8	35	€350,000	(United States) Scott Blumstein	€129,500	

== Terms and Conditions ==
MCOP and Holland Casino applies the so-called TDA (Tournament Directors Association) Poker Tournament Directors Association rules for tournament poker.Holland Casino
