= Magic: The Gathering Pro Tour season 2000–01 =

2000–01 Pro Tour season
- Pro Player of the Year: (Germany) Kai Budde
- Rookie of the Year: (Japan) Katsuhiro Mori
- World Champion: (Netherlands) Tom Van de Logt
- Pro Tours: 6
- Grands Prix: 27
- Masters: 4
- Start of season: 23 September 2000
- End of season: 12 August 2001

The 2000–01 Pro Tour season was the sixth season of the Magic: The Gathering Pro Tour. On 23 September 2000 the season began with parallel Grand Prixs in Sapporo and Porto. It ended on 12 August 2001 with the conclusion of the 2001 World Championship in Toronto. The season consisted of 27 Grand Prixs and 6 Pro Tours, held in New York, Chicago, Los Angeles, Tokyo, Barcelona, and Toronto. Also special Master Series tournaments were held at four Pro Tours. These tournaments featured huge cash prizes, but were open to only 32 players. At the end of the season Kai Budde was proclaimed Pro Player of the Year, making him the only player to win the title more than once.

== Grand Prixs – Sapporo, Porto ==
GP Porto (23–24 September)

1. (France) Antoine Ruel
2. (France) Olivier Ruel
3. (United States) David Williams
4. (United States) Michael Pustilnik
5. (Canada) Ryan Fuller
6. (Spain) Paco Llopis
7. (Poland) Gromko Radoslaw
8. (Portugal) Ru Mariani Rodrigues

GP Sapporo (23–24 September)

1. (Japan) Satoshi Nakamura
2. (Japan) Takamasa Fukata
3. (Japan) Tomohiro Maruyama
4. (Japan) Kazuyuki Momose
5. (Japan) Kiyoshi Sasanuma
6. (Japan) John Taro Kageyama
7. (Japan) Katsuhiro Mori
8. (Japan) Yuji Otsubo

== Pro Tour – New York (29 September – 1 October 2000) ==
New York was the second team Pro Tour. Scott Johns made his fifth final day appearance. His team, "Potato Nation", did not lose a match throughout the tournament. At PT New York the master series had its debut. This was a tournament series featuring huge cash prizes, but open only to the very best players in the world. The 25 players with the most Pro Points and the 5 Players with the highest rating in the format of the Masters were invited. Additionally a gateway tournament was held on the day before the Pro Tour. In that tournament each Pro Player with at least six Pro Points could compete for one of two additional slots.

=== Tournament data ===
Prize pool: $202,200
Players: 330 (110 teams)
Format: Team Sealed (Mercadian Masques, Nemesis, Prophecy) – first day, Team Rochester Draft (Mercadian Masques-Nemesis-Prophecy) – final two days
Head Judge: Dan Gray

=== Top 4 ===
Semi-finals
Potato Nation	2
Draften und Spielen	1
Car Acrobatic Team	2
Rolled-Up Aces	1

Finals
Potato Nation	2
Car Acrobatic Team	0

=== Final standings ===
Place	Team	Player	Prize	Pro Points	Comment
1	Potato Nation	(United States) Scott Johns	$60,000	24	5th Top 8 finish
1	Potato Nation	(United States) Mike Turian	$60,000	24	
1	Potato Nation	(Canada) Gary Wise	$60,000	24	2nd Final day
2	Car Acrobatic Team	(United States) Andrew Cuneo	$30,000	12	
2	Car Acrobatic Team	(United States) Aaron Forsythe	$30,000	12	
2	Car Acrobatic Team	(United States) Andrew Johnson	$30,000	12	
3	Rolled-Up Aces	(United States) Dan Clegg	$18,000	10	
3	Rolled-Up Aces	(United States) Shawn Keller	$18,000	10	2nd Final day
3	Rolled-Up Aces	(United States) Thomas Keller	$18,000	10	
4	Draften und Spielen	(Germany) Christian Lührs	$15,000	10	3rd Final day
4	Draften und Spielen	(Germany) Patrick Mello	$15,000	10	
4	Draften und Spielen	(Germany) Stephan Valkyser	$15,000	10	

=== Masters – Extended ===
1st Round
1	Kai Budde
Jason Zila	2
16	Mark Le Pine
Tony Dobson	2
8	Ben Rubin	2
Gary Wise
9	Trevor Blackwell	2
Jon Finkel
4	Kyle Rose	2
Raffaele Lo Moro
13	Warren Marsh	2
Justin Gary
5	Alex Shvartsman	2
Zvi Mowshowitz
12	Sigurd Eskeland	2
Steven O'Mahoney-Schwartz
2	Darwin Kastle
Trey Van Cleave	2
15	Raphaël Lévy
Kurt Burgner	2
7	Alan Comer
Dirk Baberowski	2
10	Dave Humpherys
Christian Lührs	2
3	Bob Maher, Jr.	2
Franck Canu
14	Rob Dougherty	2
John Masks
6	William Jensen	2
Nicolai Herzog
11	Matt Linde
Olivier Ruel	2

2nd Round
Jason Zila	2
Tony Dobson
Ben Rubin	2
Trevor Blackwell
Kyle Rose
Warren Marsh	2
Alex Shvartsman
Sigurd Eskeland	2
Trey Van Cleave	2
Kurt Burgner
Dirk Baberowski	2
Christian Lührs
Bob Maher, Jr.	2
Rob Dougherty
William Jensen	2
Olivier Ruel

Quarter-finals
Jason Zila	2
8	Ben Rubin	0
13	Warren Marsh	0
12	Sigurd Eskeland	2
Trey Van Cleave	2
Dirk Baberowski	1
3	Bob Maher, Jr.	0
6	William Jensen	2

Semi-finals
Jason Zila	2
12	Sigurd Eskeland	0
Trey Van Cleave	0
6	William Jensen	2

Finals
Jason Zila	1
6	William Jensen	2

=== Pro Player of the year standings ===
Rank	Player	Pro Points
1	(United States) Scott Johns	24
1	(United States) Mike Turian	24
1	(Canada) Gary Wise	24
4	(France) Antoine Ruel	14
5	(France) Olivier Ruel	13

== Grand Prixs – Manchester, Helsinki, Dallas, Kyoto, Phoenix, Sydney, Florence, Buenos Aires ==
GP Manchester (7–8 October)

1. (United States) Darwin Kastle
2. (England) John Ormerod
3. (United States) Mark Le Pine
4. (Netherlands) Noah Boeken
5. (United States) Justin Gary
6. (France) Marc Hernandez
7. (England) Neil Rigby
8. (United States) Zvi Mowshowitz

GP Helsinki (28–29 October)

1. (Netherlands) Noah Boeken
2. (Finland) Erno Ekebom
3. (Finland) Arto Hiltunen
4. (Sweden) Rickard Österberg
5. (Sweden) Messaoud Bouchaib
6. (Germany) Dominik Hothow
7. (Sweden) Erik Leander
8. (Sweden) Jens Thorén

GP Dallas (28–29 October)

1. (Canada) Matthew Vienneau
2. (United States) Chris Benafel
3. (United States) Dan Clegg
4. (United States) Matt Linde
5. (United States) Dustin Stern
6. (United States) Ben Romig
7. (United States) Peter Leiher
8. (United States) Trevor Blackwell

GP Kyoto (11–12 November)

1. (Japan) Tsuyoshi Fujita
2. (Japan) Yuki Murakami
3. (Japan) Katsuhiro Mori
4. (Canada) Ryan Fuller
5. (Japan) Eisaku Itadani
6. (Japan) Tsuyoshi Doyama
7. (Japan) Tomohiro Maruyama
8. (Taiwan) Tobey Tamber

GP Phoenix (11–12 November)

1. (United States) Sean Fitzgerald
2. (United States) Sean Smith
3. (United States) Thomas Keller
4. (United States) Scott Johns
5. (United States) Robert Swarowski
6. (United States) Joel Frank
7. (United States) Terry Welty
8. (United States) Chris Demaci

GP Sydney (18–19 November)

1. (New Zealand) Gordon Lin
2. (Australia) Will Copeman
3. (Japan) Satoshi Nakamura
4. (Australia) Joe Connolly
5. (Singapore) Royce Chai
6. (Australia) Chris Allen
7. (Australia) Anatoli Lightfoot
8. (Australia) Kim Brebach

GP Florence (25–26 November)

1. (Austria) Benedikt Klauser
2. (Netherlands) Bram Snepvangers
3. (Germany) Kai Budde
4. (Switzerland) Martin Zürcher
5. (England) Ben Ronaldson
6. (Italy) Daniele Canavesi
7. (Italy) Mario Pascoli
8. (France) Lionel Benezech

GP Buenos Aires (25–26 November)

1. (Mexico) Hugo Ariza
2. (Chile) Walter Witt
3. (Argentina) Pablo Huerta
4. (Chile) Rafael Le Saux
5. (Argentina) Diego Ostrovich
6. (France) José Barbero
7. (Argentina) Emmanuel Duering
8. (Argentina) Mathias Bollati

== Pro Tour – Chicago (1–3 December 2000) ==
Chicago was the first Pro Tour featuring the Standard format since Dallas more than four years before. In a top eight which is considered to be one of the best ever, Kai Budde won the title against Kamiel Cornelissen. He thus became the third player to win two Pro Tours. With the exception of Jay Elarar, every player in the top eight now has at least three Pro Tour top eights, including a win. In the Masters event Ben Rubin defeated Jon Finkel in the final.

=== Tournament data ===
Prize pool: $200,130
Players: 332
Format: Standard
Head Judge: Mike Donais

=== Top 8 ===
Quarter-finals
1	Kai Budde	3
8	Jay Elarar	2
4	Zvi Mowshowitz	1
5	Brian Kibler	3
2	Jon Finkel	1
7	Kamiel Cornelissen	3
3	Michael Pustilnik	1
6	Rob Dougherty	3

Semi-finals
Kai Budde	3
Brian Kibler	1
Kamiel Cornelissen	3
Rob Dougherty	1

Finals
Kai Budde	3
Kamiel Cornelissen	0

=== Final standings ===
Place	Player	Prize	Pro Points	Comment
1	(Germany) Kai Budde	$30,000	32	2nd Final day, 2nd Pro Tour win
2	(Netherlands) Kamiel Cornelissen	$20,000	24	
3	(United States) Brian Kibler	$15,000	16	
4	(United States) Rob Dougherty	$13,000	16	3rd Final day
5	(United States) Jon Finkel	$9,000	12	8th Final day
6	(United States) Michael Pustilnik	$8,500	12	2nd Final day
7	(United States) Zvi Mowshowitz	$8,000	12	2nd Final day
8	(Canada) Jay Elarar	$7,500	12	

=== Masters – Booster Draft ===
1st Round
1	Bob Maher, Jr.
32	Kai Budde
16	Brian Davis
17	Zvi Mowshowitz
8	Gary Wise	2
25	Dan Clegg
9	Kyle Rose	2
24	Jelger Wiegersma
4	Ben Rubin	2
29	Igor Freayman
13	Raphaël Lévy
20	Thomas Preyer	2
5	William Jensen
28	David Williams	2
12	Warren Marsh
21	Mike Long	2
2	Jon Finkel	2
31	John Ormerod
15	Stephan Valkyser
18	Joeb Weber	2
7	Trevor Blackwell
26	Mike Bregoli	2
10	Sigurd Eskeland
23	Jakub Slemr	2
3	Alex Shvartsman	2
30	Andrew Cuneo
14	Mike Turian
19	Ryan Fuller	2
6	Darwin Kastle
27	Satoshi Nakamura	2
11	Chris Benafel
22	Christian Lührs	2

2nd Round
Bob Maher, Jr.	2
Brian Davis
Gary Wise
Kyle Rose	2
Ben Rubin	2
Thomas Preyer
David Williams	2
Michael Long
Jon Finkel	2
Joe Weber
Mike Bregoli	2
Jakub Slemr
Alex Shvartsman	2
Ryan Fuller
Satoshi Nakamura
Christian Lührs	2

Quarter-finals
Bob Maher Jr.	1
Kyle Rose	2
Ben Rubin	2
David Williams	?
Jon Finkel	2
Mike Bregoli	1
Alex Shvartsman	2
Christian Lührs	1

Semi-finals
Kyle Rose	?
Ben Rubin	2
Jon Finkel	2
Alex Shvartsman	0

Finals
Ben Rubin	2
Jon Finkel	0

=== Pro Player of the year standings ===
Rank	Player	Pro Points
1	(Germany) Kai Budde	40
2	(United States) Scott Johns	35
3	(United States) Mike Turian	29
4	(Netherlands) Kamiel Cornelissen	28
4	(Canada) Gary Wise	28

== Grand Prixs – Singapore, New Orleans, Amsterdam, Hiroshima ==
GP Singapore (9–10 December)

1. (Singapore) Sam Lau
2. (Singapore) Jonathan Chan
3. (Taiwan) Kuo Tzu-Ching
4. (Japan) Masayuki Higashino
5. (Taiwan) Yi Jie Vice Lin
6. (Malaysia) Tishem Tham
7. (Singapore) Boon Tat Elvin Eng
8. (Singapore) Nicholas Wong

GP New Orleans (6–7 January)

1. (United States) Bill Stead
2. (United States) Michelle Bush
3. (United States) Gary Rush
4. (United States) Steven O'Mahoney Schwartz
5. (United States) Casey McCarrel
6. (United States) Eric Kesselman
7. (United States) Jamie Parke
8. (United States) Dustin Stern

GP Amsterdam (13–14 January)

1. (United States) Chris Benafel
2. (Spain) Xavier Curto Vives
3. (United States) Brian Davis
4. (United States) Daniel O'Mahoney Schwartz
5. (United States) David Price
6. (France) Antoine Ruel
7. (Netherlands) Menno Dolstra
8. (Netherlands) Alexander Witt

GP Hiroshima (27–28 January)

1. (Japan) Masayuki Higashino
2. (Japan) Masaya Mori
3. (Japan) Nobuaki Shikata
4. (Japan) Masahiko Morita
5. (Japan) Katsuhiro Mori
6. (Japan) Tsuyoshi Fujita
7. (Japan) Koby Okada
8. (Japan) Toshiki Tsukamoto

== Pro Tour – Los Angeles (2–4 February 2001) ==
The 2001 Pro Tour Los Angeles was the last Pro Tour held on the Queen Mary, where all previous Pro Tours in Los Angeles had been held. In a final eight featuring three players, who had also been amongst the last eight in Chicago, Michael Pustilnik took the title and thus the lead in the Pro Player of the year standings. Kamiel Cornelissen also made his second consecutive second place Pro Tour finish, the first person to do so in Pro Tour history.

=== Tournament data ===
Players: 327
Prize Pool: $200,130
Format: Rochester Draft (Invasion)
Head Judge: Collin Jackson

=== Top 8 ===
Quarter-finals
1	Michael Pustilnik	3
8	Lawrence Creech	1
4	Benedikt Klauser	3
5	Erno Ekebom	1
2	Michael Gurney	1
7	Jon Finkel	3
3	Kyle Rose	1
6	Kamiel Cornelissen	3

Semi-finals
Michael Pustilnik	3
Benedikt Klauser	1
Jon Finkel	0
Kamiel Cornelissen	3

Finals
Michael Pustilnik	3
Kamiel Cornelissen	2

=== Final standings ===
Place	Player	Prize	Pro Points	Comment
1	(United States) Michael Pustilnik	$30,000	32	3rd Final day
2	(Netherlands) Kamiel Cornelissen	$20,000	24	2nd Final day
3	(Austria) Benedikt Klauser	$15,000	16	3rd Final day
4	(United States) Jon Finkel	$13,000	16	9th Final day
5	(United States) Kyle Rose	$9,000	12	4th Final day
6	(United States) Michael Gurney	$8,500	12	
7	(Finland) Erno Ekebom	$8,000	12	2nd Final day
8	(United States) Lawrence Creech	$7,500	12	

=== Pro Player of the year standings ===
Rank	Player	Pro Points
1	(United States) Michael Pustilnik	55
2	(Netherlands) Kamiel Cornelissen	52
3	(Germany) Kai Budde	47
4	(United States) Scott Johns	40
5	(Canada) Gary Wise	37

== Grand Prixs – Kaohsiung, Valencia, Cologne, Boston, Prague, Rio de Janeiro ==
GP Kaohsiung (10–11 February)

1. (Taiwan) Tobey Tamber
2. (Taiwan) Kuo Tzu-Ching
3. (Hong Kong) King Yim Kingston Tong
4. (Singapore) Nick Wong
5. (Japan) Fumio Hoshino
6. (Taiwan) Granger Petersen
7. (Japan) Toshiki Tsukamoto
8. (Hong Kong) Hon Ming Au Yeung

GP Valencia (10–11 February)

1. (Spain) Ricard Tuduri
2. (France) Olivier Ruel
3. (Netherlands) Noah Boeken
4. (Canada) Ryan Fuller
5. (United States) Michael Pustilnik
6. (Portugal) Manuel Ramos
7. (Spain) Raul Mestre
8. (Spain) Raul Peret

GP Cologne (24–25 February)

1. (Germany) Jim Herold
2. (France) Antoine Ruel
3. (Denmark) Trey Van Cleave
4. (Netherlands) Joost Vollebregt
5. (Germany) Daniel Zink
6. (Netherlands) Frank Karsten
7. (Germany) Christoph Lippert
8. (Belgium) Jan Doise

GP Boston (24–25 February)

1. (United States) Tom Swan
2. (United States) Scott Johns
3. (United States) Alan Comer
4. (Canada) Matthew Vienneau
5. (United States) Brian Hegstad
6. (United States) Kurtis Hahn
7. (United States) Kyle Rose
8. (United States) Chris Benafel

GP Prague (10–11 March)

1. (Canada) Ryan Fuller
2. (Sweden) Jens Thoren
3. (Czech Republic) Jakub Slemr
4. (Denmark) Trey Van Cleave
5. (Austria) Thomas Preyer
6. (France) Antoine Ruel
7. (Germany) Kristian Kockott
8. (Netherlands) Noah Boeken

GP Rio de Janeiro (10–11 March)

1. (Brazil) Carlos Romão
2. (United States) Alex Shvartsman
3. (United States) Justin Schneider
4. (Brazil) Rafael Alvarenga
5. (Chile) Rafael Le Saux
6. (Argentina) Ernesto Mingorance
7. (Uruguay) Damian Brown-Santirso
8. (Brazil) Daniel Brasil do Carmo

== Pro Tour – Tokyo (16–18 March 2001) ==
The 2001 Pro Tour Tokyo saw a number of interesting firsts for the Pro Tour. Canadian player Ryan Fuller became the first player to go undefeated in the Swiss rounds of a Pro Tour, finishing with a 14–0 record. Also, Tsuyoshi Fujita became the first Japanese player to make a Pro Tour Top 8. Ultimately it was future Hall of Fame member Zvi Mowshowitz who would take the title, winning his first individual Pro Tour.

=== Tournament data ===
Players: 270
Prize Pool: $200,130
Format: Invasion Block Constructed (Invasion, Planeshift)
Head Judge: Chris Zantides

=== Top 8 ===
Quarter-finals
1	Ryan Fuller	2
8	Chris Benafel	3
4	Frederico Bastos	0
5	Zvi Mowshowitz	3
2	David Williams	1
7	Tsuyoshi Fujita	3
3	Philip Freneau	0
6	Lucas Hager	3

Semi-finals
Chris Benafel	1
Zvi Mowshowitz	3
Lucas Hager	1
Tsuyoshi Fujita	3

Finals
Zvi Mowshowitz	3
Tsuyoshi Fujita	0

=== Final standings ===
Place	Player	Prize	Pro Points	Comment
1	(United States) Zvi Mowshowitz	$30,000	32	3rd Final day
2	(Japan) Tsuyoshi Fujita	$20,000	24	1st Asian Player in a Top 8, 1st Japanese Player in a Top 8
3	(United States) Lucas Hager	$15,000	16	
4	(United States) Chris Benafel	$13,000	16	2nd Final day
5	(Canada) Ryan Fuller	$9,000	12	2nd Final day
6	(United States) Philip Freneau	$8,500	12	
7	(United States) David Williams	$8,000	12	
8	(Portugal) Frederico Bastos	$7,500	12	1st Portuguese Player in a Top 8

=== Masters – Team Rochester Draft ===
Quarter-finals
1	Your Move Games	1
8	Car Acrobatic Team	2
4	Team Outland	0
5	Panzer Hunters	2
2	Potato Nation	?
7	AlphaBetaUnlimited.com	2
3	Black Ops	2
6	Game Empire	?

Semi-finals
Car Acrobatic Team	?
Panzer Hunter	2
AlphaBetaUnlimited.com	2
Black Ops	0

Finals
Panzer Hunter	1
AlphaBetaUnlimited.com	2

Team	Player	Team	Player
AlphaBetaUnlimited.com	(Canada) Ryan Fuller	Panzer Hunter	(Japan) Momose Kazuyuki
AlphaBetaUnlimited.com	(Netherlands) Noah Boeken	Panzer Hunter	(Japan) Itaru Ishida
AlphaBetaUnlimited.com	(United States) Chris Benafel	Panzer Hunter	(Japan) Reiji Ando
Black-Ops	(France) Florent Jeudon	Potato Nation	(United States) Scott Johns
Black-Ops	(France) Antoine Ruel	Potato Nation	(Canada) Gary Wise
Black-Ops	(France) Olivier Ruel	Potato Nation	(United States) Mike Turian
Car Acrobatic Team	(United States) Andrew Johnson	Team Outland	(Norway) Nicolai Herzog
Car Acrobatic Team	(United States) Andrew Cuneo	Team Outland	(Norway) Eivind Nitter
Car Acrobatic Team	(United States) Aaron Forsythe	Team Outland	(Norway) Bjorn Jocumsen
Game Empire	(United States) Kurt Burgner	Your Move Games	(United States) Rob Dougherty
Game Empire	(United States) Alan Comer	Your Move Games	(United States) Dave Humpherys
Game Empire	(United States) Brian Selden	Your Move Games	(United States) Darwin Kastle

=== Pro Player of the year standings ===
Rank	Player	Pro Points
1	(United States) Michael Pustilnik	60
2	(Netherlands) Kamiel Cornelissen	58
3	(Germany) Kai Budde	50
4	(United States) Scott Johns	49
4	(United States) Zvi Mowshowitz	49

== Grand Prixs – Gothenburg, Detroit, Moscow ==
GP Gothenburg (24–25 March)

1. (Netherlands) Jan Schreurs
2. (Denmark) Josper Manne Thranne
3. (France) Raphaël Lévy
4. (England) Scott Willis
5. (Norway) Eivind Nitter
6. (Sweden) Marcus Angelin
7. (Norway) Sondre Ellingvåg
8. (Sweden) Jimmy Öman

GP Detroit (31 March – 1 April)

1. (Canada) Matthew Vienneau
2. (United States) Brock Parker
3. (United States) Bob Maher, Jr.
4. (United States) Dan Clegg
5. (United States) William Jensen
6. (United States) Adam Prokopin
7. (United States) Aaron Breider
8. (Canada) Louis Boileau

GP Moscow (21–22 April)

1. (Canada) Ryan Fuller
2. (Germany) Iwan Tan
3. (Russia) Yuri Markin
4. (France) Antoine Ruel
5. (Russia) Eugene Okin
6. (United States) David Williams
7. (Russia) Sergey Norin
8. (Russia) Rustam Bakirov

== Pro Tour – Barcelona (4–6 May 2001) ==
In Barcelona Kai Budde became the first player to win three Pro Tours overall and also the first to win two Pro Tours in a single season. Ben Rubin won the Masters and thus became the only player to win two Masters tournaments.

=== Tournament data ===
Players: 335
Prize Pool: $200,130
Format: Booster Draft (Invasion-Planeshift)
Head Judge: Thomas Bisballe

=== Top 8 ===
Quarter-finals
1	Dan Clegg	3
8	Chad Ellis	0
4	Alan Comer	3
5	Brad Swan	0
2	Kai Budde	3
7	Albertus Law	0
3	Patrick Mello	3
6	Yuri Kolomeyko	0

Semi-finals
Dan Clegg	2
Alan Comer	3
Kai Budde	3
Patrick Mello	1

Finals
Alan Comer	1
Kai Budde	3

=== Final standings ===
Place	Player	Prize	Pro Points	Comment
1	(Germany) Kai Budde	$30,000	32	3rd Final day, 3rd Pro Tour win
2	(United States) Alan Comer	$20,000	24	5th Final day
3	(United States) Dan Clegg	$15,000	16	2nd Final day
4	(Germany) Patrick Mello	$13,000	16	2nd Final day
5	(United States) Brad Swan	$9,000	12	
6	(Singapore) Albertus Law	$8,500	12	1st Singaporean in a Top 8
7	(Ukraine) Yuri Kolomeyko	$8,000	12	1st Ukrainian in a Top 8
8	(United States) Chad Ellis	$7,500	12	

=== Masters – Invasion Block Constructed ===
1st Round
1	Jon Finkel
32	Arto Hiltunen
16	Benedikt Klauser	2
17	William Jensen
8	Ryan Fuller	2
25	Darwin Kastle
9	Tsuyoshi Fujita
24	Dave Humpherys	2
4	Kamiel Cornelissen
29	Ben Rubin	2
13	Rob Dougherty	2
20	Philip Freneau
5	Kai Budde
28	Tuomo Nieminen	2
12	Sigurd Eskeland
21	David Williams	2
2	Zvi Mowshowitz	2
31	Warren Marsh
15	Noah Boeken	2
18	Antoine Ruel
7	Chris Benafel
26	Tommi Hovi	2
10	Scott Johns
23	Markus Bell	2
3	Michael Pustilnik
30	Mike Turian	2
14	Alex Shvartsman	2
19	Olivier Ruel
6	Bob Maher, Jr.
27	Jay Elarar	2
11	Gary Wise	2
22	Satoshi Nakamura

2nd Round
Jon Finkel	2
Benedikt Klauser
Ryan Fuller	2
Dave Humpherys
Ben Rubin	2
Rob Dougherty
Tuomo Nieminen	2
David Williams
Zvi Mowshowitz	2
Noah Boeken
Tommi Hovi
Markus Bell	2
Mike Turian	2
Alex Shvartsman
Jay Elarar	2
Gary Wise

Quarter-final
Jon Finkel	2
Ryan Fuller	1
Ben Rubin	2
Tuomo Nieminen	1
Zvi Mowshowitz	2
Markus Bell	0
Mike Turian	0
Jay Elarar	2

Semi-finals
Jon Finkel	0
Ben Rubin	2
Zvi Mowshowitz	0
Jay Elarar	2

Finals
Ben Rubin	2
Jay Elarar	0

=== Pro Player of the year standings ===
Rank	Player	Pro Points
1	(Germany) Kai Budde	83
2	(United States) Michael Pustilnik	66
3	(Netherlands) Kamiel Cornelissen	64
4	(Canada) Ryan Fuller	55
4	(United States) Scott Johns	55

== Grand Prixs – Yokohama, Turin, Taipei, Columbus ==
GP Yokohama (12–13 May)
1. AlphaBetaUnlimited.com

(United States) Chris Benafel
(Canada) Ryan Fuller
(United States) David Williams

2. Poor Shark

(Japan) Masashiro Kuroda
(Japan) Tomomi Otsuka
(Japan) Masahiko Morita

3. Voice of Soul

(Japan) Tsuyoshi Douyama
(Japan) Tadayoshi Komiya
(Japan) Takao Higaki

4. Fire Beat

(Japan) Tsuyoshi Ikeda
(Japan) Toshiki Tsukamoto
(Japan) Jun Nobushita

GP Turin (26–27 May)
1. Team Clegg

(United States) Peter Szigeti
(United States) Brock Parker
(United States) Daniel Clegg

2. AlphaBetaUnlimited.com

(Canada) Ryan Fuller
(United States) Chris Benafel
(Netherlands) Noah Boeken

3. Angstschreeuw

(Netherlands) Menno Dolstra
(Netherlands) Jan Schreurs
(Netherlands) Bram Snepvangers

4. One Day Fly

(Netherlands) Tom Van de Logt
(Netherlands) Kamiel Cornelissen
(Netherlands) Jelger Wiegersma

GP Taipei (21–22 July)
1. www.alphabetaunlimited.com/

(United States) David Williams
(United States) Chris Benafel
(United States) Daniel Clegg

2. Anchans

(Japan) Osamu Fujita
(Japan) Itaru Ishida
(Japan) Katsuhiro Mori

3. Team T.T.T.

(Taiwan) Kuo Tzu-Ching
(Taiwan) Chen Yu Wang
(Taiwan) Dell Sun

4. Dr. no-right

(Taiwan) Jack Ho
(Taiwan) Yen Chang Lee
(Taiwan) Yang Bo Wang

GP Columbus (28–29 July)
1. Your Move Games

(United States) Darwin Kastle
(United States) Dave Humpherys
(United States) Rob Dougherty

2. The Ken Ho All-Stars

(United States) Daniel Clegg
(United States) Ken Ho
(United States) Lan D. Ho

3. Dynasty

(Canada) Gabriel Tsang
(United States) Brian Hacker
(United States) Ben Rubin

4. The Ancient Kavus

(Canada) Gary Krakower
(Canada) Matthew Vienneau
(United States) Michael Pustilnik

== 2001 World Championships – Toronto (8–12 August 2001) ==
Tom Van de Logt won the World Championship while the United States took the team title. The final eight featured amongst several rather unknown players Antoine Ruel, Tommi Hovi, Mike Turian and David Williams, who had the dubious honour of becoming the first player to be disqualified from a Top 8.

=== Tournament data ===
Prize pool: $210,200 (individual) + $189,000 (national teams)
Players: 296
Formats: Standard, Rochester Draft (Invasion-Planeshift-Apocalypse), Extended
Head Judge: Mike Donais

=== Top 8 ===
Quarter-finals
1	Antoine Ruel	3
8	Tommi Hovi	2
4	Tom Van de Logt
5	David Williams	DQ
2	Alex Borteh	3
7	Jan Tomcani	2
3	Andrea Santin	3
6	Mike Turian	2

Semi-finals
Antoine Ruel	2
Tom Van de Logt	3
Alex Borteh	3
Andrea Santin	1

Finals
Tom Van de Logt	3
Alex Borteh	0

=== Final standings ===
Place	Player	Prize	Pro Points	Comment
1	(Netherlands) Tom Van de Logt	$35,000	32	2nd Final day, 1st Dutch Player to win a Pro Tour
2	(United States) Alex Borteh	$23,000	24	
3	(France) Antoine Ruel	$15,000	16	
4	(Italy) Andrea Santin	$13,000	16	
5	(United States) Mike Turian	$9,000	12	2nd Final day
6	(Slovakia) Jan Tomcani	$8,500	12	1st Slovakian in a Top 8
7	(Finland) Tommi Hovi	$8,000	12	4th Final day
8	(England) John Ormerod	$7,500	12	2nd Final day^{*}

^{*} John Ormerod did not actually play in the final eight. When David Williams was disqualified he advanced to the eight place in the final standings, though.

=== National team competition ===
1. United States (Trevor Blackwell, Brian Hegstad, Eugene Harvey)
2. Norway (Nicolai Herzog, Oyvind Odegaard, Jan Pieter Groenhof)

== Pro Player of the year final standings ==
After the World Championship Kai Budde was awarded the Pro Player of the year title. He thus became the first player to win the title more than once.

Rank	Player	Pro Points
1	(Germany) Kai Budde	88
2	(Netherlands) Kamiel Cornelissen	75
3	(United States) Michael Pustilnik	71
4	(United States) Chris Benafel	65
5	(Canada) Ryan Fuller	64
5	(United States) Zvi Mowshowitz	64
