= Mike Turian =

American Magic: The Gathering player

- Nationality: (United States) American
- Pro Tour debut: 1997 Pro Tour Chicago
- Winnings: US$118,053
- Pro Tour wins (Top 8): 1 (5)
- Grand Prix wins (Top 8): 2 (6)
- Lifetime Pro Points: 234
- Planeswalker Level: 46 (Archmage)

Michael Turian is a professional player of Magic: The Gathering. He won Pro Tour New York with Team Potato Nation. Turian won two Grand Prixs. In 2008 Mike Turian was voted in the Hall of Fame. He was inducted during the World Championship.

== Career ==
Mike Turian qualified for Pro Tour (PT) Chicago 1997 at a PTQ in Akron, Ohio. He finished 27th at PT Chicago, winning money and automatically qualifying for the next PT in Mainz. An 11th place at Mainz was followed by several Pro Tour money finishes (Top 64 at the time). Eventually he won Pro Tour New York 2000 with teammates Gary Wise and Scott Johns. A 5th place at the World Championship in Toronto in the season followed.

The next season started off well with a win Grand Prix Montreal 2001, but other than that some less successful seasons followed for Turian. Eventually the 2003–04 season became his most successful with final day appearance at PT Boston, Amsterdam, and San Diego. He also won another Grand Prix at Columbus.

He left the Pro Tour in 2004, to take a job as developer at Wizards of the Coast.

== Accomplishments ==
Season	Event type	Location	Format	Date	Rank
1997–98	Grand Prix	Toronto	Block Constructed	30–31 August 1997	7
1998–99	Grand Prix	Washington D.C.	Booster Draft	18–20 June 1999	5
1999–00	Nationals	Orlando	Special	8–11 June 2000	5
2000–01	Pro Tour	New York City	Team Limited	27 September–1 October 2000	1
2000–01	Worlds	Toronto	Special	8–12 August 2001	5
2001–02	Grand Prix	Montreal	Limited	13–14 October 2001	1
2001–02	Grand Prix	Milwaukee	Standard	11–12 May 2002	3
2002–03	Nationals	San Diego	Special	27–29 June 2003	8
2003–04	Pro Tour	Boston	Team Limited	12–14 September 2003	3
2003–04	Pro Tour	Amsterdam	Limited	16–18 January 2004	8
2003–04	Grand Prix	Oakland	Booster Draft	7–8 February 2004	3
2003–04	Grand Prix	Columbus, Ohio	Limited	27–28 March 2004	1
2003–04	Pro Tour	San Diego	Limited	14–16 May 2004	3

Last updated: 7 November 2011
Source: Wizards.com

Other accomplishments:

- Member of the 2008 Hall of Fame
