= Scott Johns =

American Magic: The Gathering player

- Nationality: (United States) America
- Pro Tour debut: 1996 Pro Tour Los Angeles
- Winnings: US$96,283
- Pro Tour wins (Top 8): 1 (5)
- Grand Prix wins (Top 8): 0 (2)
- Lifetime Pro Points: 164
- Planeswalker Level: 43 (Battlemage)

Scott Johns is the former editor of magicthegathering.com, and a former Magic: The Gathering Pro player. During his playing career he reached the top eight of a Pro Tour five times including his very first Pro Tour, and won Pro Tour New York 2000 with Gary Wise and Mike Turian as a part of Potato Nation.

== Achievements ==
Season	Event type	Location	Format	Date	Rank
1996	Pro Tour	Los Angeles	Booster Draft	3–5 May 1996	5
1996	Pro Tour	Columbus, Ohio	Block Constructed	6–7 July 1996	8
1996	Worlds	Seattle	Special	14–18 August 1996	6
1997–98	Worlds	Seattle	Special	12–16 August 1998	5
2000–01	Pro Tour	New York City	Team Limited	29 September–1 October 2000	1
2000–01	Grand Prix	Phoenix, Arizona	Extended	11–12 September 2000	4
2000–01	Grand Prix	Boston	Sealed and Booster Draft	24–25 February 2001	2
2000–01	Masters	Tokyo	Team Limited	16–18 March 2001	6

Last updated: 29 August 2009
Source: Wizards.com

=== Other accomplishments ===
- Johns won the Type I (Vintage) division of PT Dallas 1996
