= Holland Casino =

State-owned Dutch gambling company

Coordinates: 52.3624°N 4.8823°E

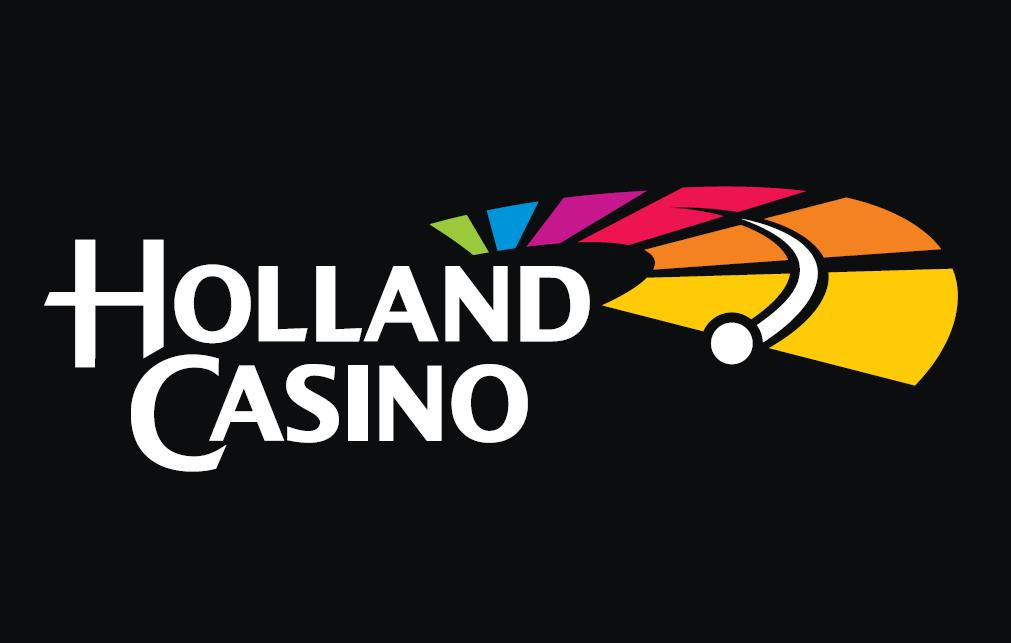
- Holland Casino logo
- Company type: Public
- Industry: Gambling industry
- Founded: October 1, 1976; 49 years ago in Zandvoort, Netherlands
- Headquarters: Hoofddorp, Netherlands
- Area served: Netherlands
- Revenue: 700 million euro
- Owner: Kingdom of the Netherlands
- Website: Official website

Holland Casino is a Dutch state-owned company and has the legal monopoly on gambling in the Netherlands, and has thirteen casinos located throughout the country. Profits from Holland Casino go directly to the Dutch treasury. In 2007, profit was around 267 million euros and in 2006 some 263 million euros. Since October 2021, Holland Casino has also offered online gambling. In February 2025, the first Holland Casino in Zandvoort was closed due to unprofitability.

== Casinos ==
The headquarters of Holland Casino is located in Hoofddorp. The first casino opened in Zandvoort on October 1, 1976. Since 2008, the Amsterdam casino is the largest branch. Other branches can be found at:

- Breda
- Eindhoven
- Enschede
- Groningen
- Leeuwarden
- Nijmegen
- Rotterdam
- Scheveningen
- Amsterdam Sloterdijk
- Utrecht
- Valkenburg
- Venlo

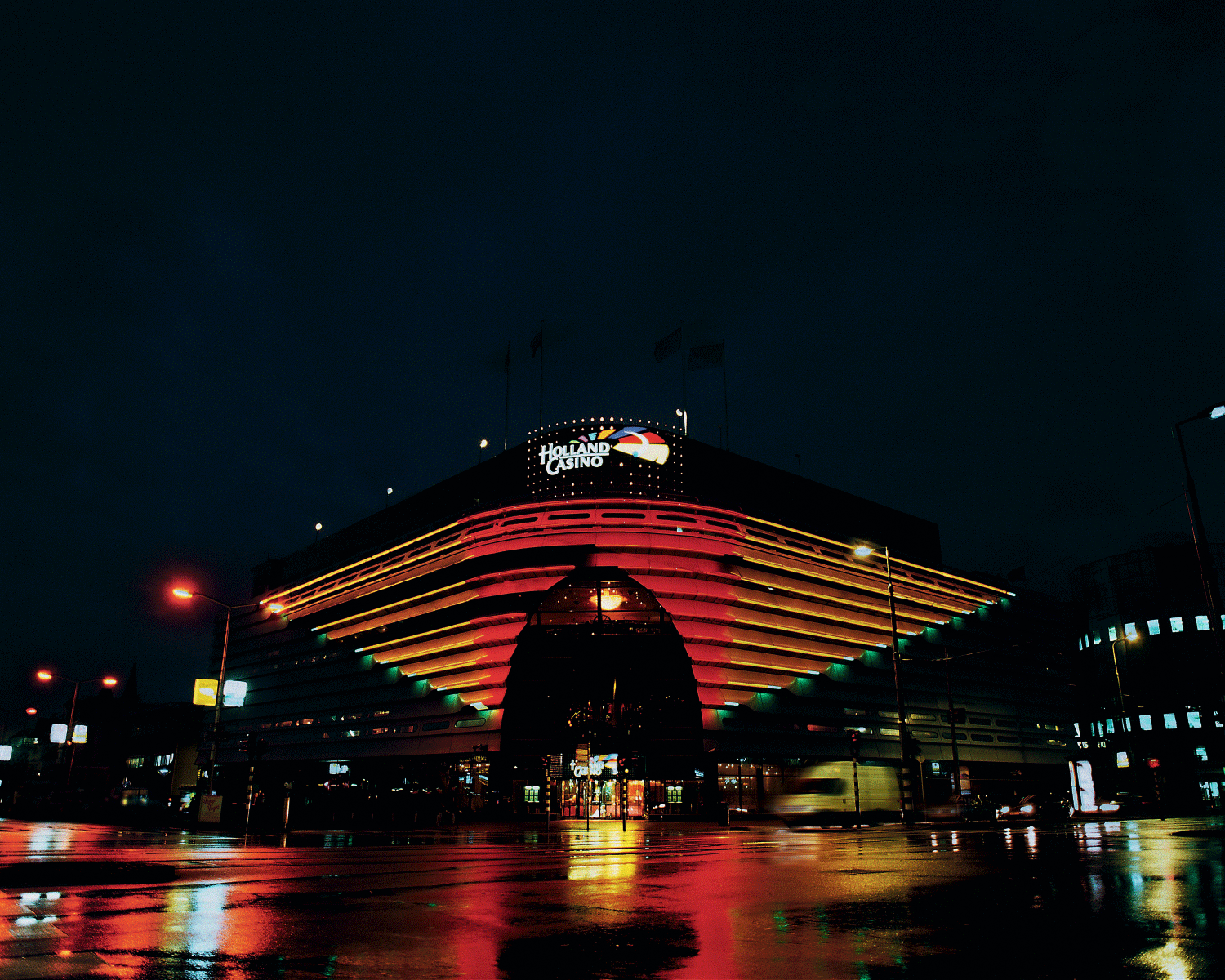
Holland Casino Scheveningen

== Games ==
In the branches of Holland Casino the following casino games can be played (not all branches offer all of these games):

- French roulette
- American roulette
- Blackjack
- Caribbean Stud Poker
- Bingo
- Poker
- Sic Bo
- Punto Banco
- Money Wheel

Average payment rate was 93% at slot machines, while the legal minimum is 80%. The tables is the average payout ratio 97.7%. All gambling machines are supervised by Dutch Measurement Institute and they are also inspected by the independent inspection company Verispect.

== Awards ==
Holland Casino received the Gaming Award in 2008 for being recognized as a socially responsible operator in the international casino industry.

== Reforms of 2011 ==
In 2011, the Dutch government introduced the Remote Gambling Act, opening the online gambling market to licensed operators from 2015 onwards. The law aims to protect players and allow the majority of Dutch online gamblers to play legally within the Netherlands.
