= Noah Boeken =

Dutch poker player (born 1981)

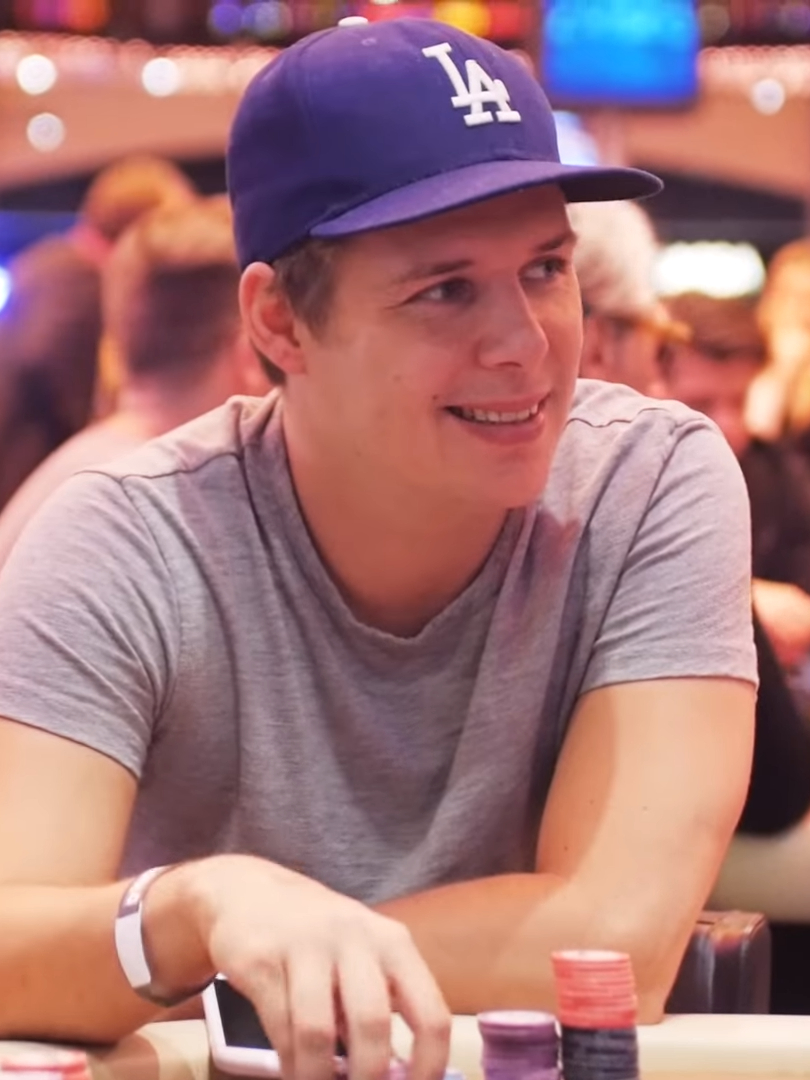
- Boeken at the WPTDeepStacks Amsterdam in 2019
- Nicknames: Exclusive, Towley88
- Born: 6 January 1981 (age 45)

World Series of Poker
- Bracelet: None
- Money finishes: 9
- Highest WSOP Main Event finish: 96th, 2009

European Poker Tour
- Title: 1
- Final tables: 2
- Money finishes: 6

Noah Boeken (Dutch pronunciation: [ˈnoːaː ˈbukə(n)]; born 6 January 1981) is a Dutch professional poker and Magic: The Gathering player.

== Magic: The Gathering career ==
In the late 1990s, Boeken was an accomplished player of Magic: The Gathering who competed internationally. He won the Magic: The Gathering 2000 European Championship.

After his success in his Magic: The Gathering career, he focused on playing poker.

== Poker career ==
=== Early career ===
Boeken's first major finish in the money was at the 2003 Master Classics of Poker, where he finished 4th in the €200 no-limit hold'em event. Eight months later, he played in the $10,000 no-limit hold'em championship of Festa al Lago II in Las Vegas, Nevada, where he cashed in 22nd place.

=== European Poker Tour ===
In October 2004, Boeken made the final table of the European Poker Tour (EPT) event in London won by professional John Shipley. Boeken made a second EPT final table in January 2005 at the Scandinavian Open in Copenhagen where he defeated professional and Hendon Mob member Ram Vaswani in the final heads-up confrontation.

=== World Series of Poker ===
Boeken attended the World Series of Poker (WSOP) in 2005 and cashed twice, including at the final table of the $2,500 limit hold'em event. He finished 96th out of 6,494 total entries in the Main Event at the 2009 World Series of Poker.

=== British Poker Open ===
Boeken won the 2006 British Poker Open collecting 50,000 GBP.

=== Poker winnings ===
As of 2023, Boeken's total live tournament winnings exceed $2,300,000.

=== Other poker ventures ===
Boeken was a member of the Team PokerStars group of sponsored players.

Boeken earned his largest tournament cash to date with a victory in the Master Classics of Poker in Amsterdam in 2013. He won the Main Event for € 306,821.

Preceded by (Norway) Nicolai Herzog	Magic European Champion; 2000	Succeeded by (Norway) Eivind Nitter
