= List of Magic: The Gathering national champions =

The Magic: The Gathering national champions are the players who won National Championships (Nationals) that year. (with the exception of champions between 2012 and 2016, which were awarded to players with the most Pro Points at the end of a Pro Tour season)

Nationals took place around the world usually in summer or autumn. Eligibility to play in a national championship was determined on residence instead of nationality. In addition, Nationals required eligible players to qualify. (prior to 2011, countries with smaller populations of Magic players open nationals were held, meaning that any eligible player could compete in this tournament)

After 2011 Nationals were discontinued by Wizards of the Coast when they restructured their Magic: The Gathering organized play program, abandoning national championships, and restructuring the World Championship. From 2012 to 2016 the title of National Champion was awarded to the player with the most Pro Points of any given country at the end of a Pro Tour season. At the end of 2018 Wizards of the Coast announced that in 2019 there would be no National Championships. As of April 2019 it is unclear whether Nationals are on hiatus or abandoned. The title National Champion will not be awarded in 2019.

In 2018, National Champions were determined in 74 nations and regions. In most cases these regions line up with countries, but special exemptions were made in some cases, for example Puerto Rico and the countries of the United Kingdom.

== Mode ==
The current National Championship tournaments were held over one to three days, depending on the number of qualified players. The players are qualified in either of 4 ways: Players who have sufficient Planeswalker Points (threshold differs from nations to nations), being a leveled-player in Pro Players Club, being a member in Hall of Fame, or winning the last-chance qualifier tournament held at the eve of the Nationals (if any).

Nationals are multiformat tournaments, consisting of a Booster Draft portion and Standard portion. Usually, both portions were played over six or seven rounds each with the players being paired Swiss style. After the Swiss part of the tournament, the best eight players advanced to the single-elimination finals. The finalists of the single-elimination rounds will be representing their Nationals in World Magic Cup along with pro point leader in previous Pro Tour season (should pro point leader is also the National's finalist, the top 3 players of the event will become National representatives).

Prior to 2011 running, the best four players qualified for the World Championship with the best three constituting the National team at the World Championship. In countries with open-entry Nationals (which with smaller populations of Magic players), only the national champion qualified for the World Championship. These countries were not represented by a national team at the World Championship.

== Winners ==
=== Argentina ===
1997: Pablo Mántaras
1998: Douglas Maioli
1999: Douglas Maioli
2000: Andrés Moro
2001: Diego Ostrovich
2002: Diego Ostrovich
2003: Jose Barbero
2004: Mauro Kina
2005: Victor Villanueva
2006: Leonardo Calcagno
2007: Nicolás Kohan
2008: Adrián Saredo
2009: Alejo Zagalsky
2010: Franco Bonazza
2011: Nicolas De Nicola
2012: Nicolas De Nicola
2013: Andres Monsalve
2014: Demian Tejo
2015: Nicolas de Nicola
2016: Luis Salvato
2017: Pedro de Diego
2018: Bruno Lombardelli

=== Australia ===
1995: Nathan Russell
1996: Joseph Tan
1997: Rod Ho
1998: Rod Ho
1999: Michael Doecke
2000: Stephen Campbell
2001: Rob Nadebaum
2002: Justin West
2003: Andrew Varga
2004: Tim He
2005: Chris Allen
2006: Tim He
2007: Steve Alpin
2008: Aaron Nicastri
2009: Jamie Mackintosh
2010: Adam Witton
2011: Aaron Nicoll
2012: Jeremy Neeman
2013: Justin Cheung
2014: Justin Cheung
2015: Paul Jackson
2016: David Mines

=== Austria ===
1995: Mu-Luen Wang
1996: Christian Peschta
1997: Christian Gregorich
1998: Christoph Derdak
1999: Philipp Cetl
2000: Helmut Summersberger
2001: Benedikt Klauser
2002: Stephan Genser
2003: Markus Jöbstl
2004: Simon Grünauer
2005: Nikolaus Eigner
2006: Benedikt Klauser
2007: Thomas Preyer
2008: Oliver Polak-Rottmann
2009: Bernhard Lehner
2010: Christian Gawrilowicz
2011: Stefan Heigerer
2012: Thomas Holzinger
2013: Thomas Holzinger
2014: Valentin Mackl
2015: Valentin Mackl
2016: Oliver Polak-Rottmann
2017: Elias Klocker
2018: Marc Mühlböck

=== Belarus ===
2005: Kirill Efimov
2006: Dzmitry Fedarovich
2007: Gleb Gobzem
2008: Dimitry Lipay
2009: Dimitry Lipay
2010: Yehor Polschak
2011: Yehor Polschak
2012: Alexander Arabyan
2013: Sergey Telipko
2014: Evgeniy Zakharenkov
2015: Aliaksei Auramionak
2016: Pavel Miadzvedski

=== Belgium ===
1995: Bart Van Uffelen
1996: David Van Dijck
1997: Nicolas Fournier
1998: Dominique Coene
1999: Dominique Coene
2000: Vincent Gieling
2001: Sinan Bolca
2002: Jan Doise
2003: Mats Clays
2004: Vincent Lemoine
2005: Gert Coeckelbergh
2006: Mark Dictus
2007: Fried Meulders
2008: Pascal Vieren
2009: Branco Neirynck
2010: Aurélien Dubuisson
2011: Vincent Lemoine
2012: Vincent Lemoine
2013: Vincent Lemoine
2014: Nicolas Vanderhallen
2015: Branco Neirynck
2016: Peter Vieren
2017: Kristof Van Holsbeeck
2018: Mark Dictus
2019: Jérôme Bastogne

=== Bolivia ===
2005: Juan Carlos Jaillita Zeballos
2006: Richard Villafranqui
2007: Antón Nava
2008: Rolando Flores
2009: Juan Carlos Vargas Carreras
2010: Alejandro Van Mourik
2011: Pietro Sanjinés Angelaccio
2012: Alejandro Van Mourik
2013: Juan Carlos Vargas Carreras
2014: Carlos Torrico
2015: David Sologuren

=== Brazil ===
1995: Fabiano de Castro
1996: Raul Assis
1997: José Ricardo
1998: Romário Brito
1999: Roberto Dantas
2000: Fabiano de Castro
2001: Marcos Tanaka
2002: Victor Galimbertti
2003: Rafael Barros
2004: Osvaldo Barbosa
2005: Pedro Henrique Uehara
2006: Paulo Vitor Damo da Rosa
2007: Lucas Berthoud
2008: Vagner Casatti
2009: Paulo Vitor Damo da Rosa
2010: Eduardo Mendes Lopes
2011: Marcus Camargo
2012: Paulo Vitor Damo da Rosa
2013: Willy Edel
2014: Willy Edel
2015: Paulo Vitor Damo da Rosa

=== Bulgaria ===
2005: Martin Nosovich
2006: Hristo Tsekov
2007: Svetlin Varbanov
2008:
2009: Nikolay Bogdev
2010: Ivan Govedarov
2011: Kaloyan Kirilov
2012: Kaloyan Kirilov
2013: Dobrin Paskov
2014: Evgeni Kaymashki
2015: Hristiyan Ivanov

=== Canada ===
1995: Eric Tam
1996: Gary Krakower
1997: Gary Krakower
1998: Peter Radonjic
1999: Marc Rajotte
2000: Ryan Fuller
2001: Terry Tsang
2002: Jürgen Hahn
2003: Josh Rider
2004: Jingpeng Zhang
2005: Jason Olynyk
2006: Guillaume Cardin
2007: Andrew Ting-A-Kee
2008: Dan Lanthier
2009: Jasar S. Elarar
2010: Jasar S. Elarar
2011: Marc Anderson
2012: Alexander Hayne
2013: Jon Stern
2014: Shaun McLaren
2015: Shaun McLaren

=== Chile ===
1997: Juan Eduardo Escobar
1999: Andres Hojman
2000: Juan Reutter
2001: Sebastian Suter
2002: Juan Reutter
2003: Jose Luis Capdevila
2004: Waldemar Barrientos
2005: Jose Luis Capdevila
2006: Julio Bernabe
2007: Andres Camargo
2008: Brian Grady
2009: Christian A. Cespedes
2010: Francisco Rojas Sessarego
2011: David Kaliski 2012: 2013: 2014: 2015: Felipe Tapia Becerra 2019: Ariel Sandoval Castro

=== China ===
2000: Jia Wei
2001:
2002:
2003: Jie Li
2004: Zhang Shu-Nu
2005: Hui Zhang
2006: Wu Jia
2007: Yu Yin
2008: Yi Ding
2009: Liang Zhu
2010: Lu Chao
2011: Chen Zhuang
2012: Xin Sui
2013: Bo Li
2014: Han Bing Sham
2015: Sun Bo

=== Chinese Taipei (Taiwan) ===
2000: Chen Yu Weng
2001:
2002: Kuo Tzu-Ching
2003: Chih-Hsiang Chang
2004: Ming Da Tsia
2005: Homg Gi Tsai
2006:
2007: Yi-Jie Lin
2008: Ming Chee Wang
2009: Kuo Tzu-Ching
2010: Kuo Tzu-Ching
2011: Bo Ruad Chun
2012: Kuo Tzu-Ching
2013: Kuo Tzu-Ching
2014: Kuo Tzu-Ching
2015: Huang Hao-Shan

=== Colombia ===
2004: Nicolás Acosta
2005: Nicolás Acosta
2006: Jose Luis Gomez
2007: Juan Fernando Giraldo
2008: Carlos Amaya
2009: Daniel Parra
2010: Gustavo Adolfo Escobar Forero
2011: Daniel Moreno
2012: Daniel Moreno
2013: Daniel Moreno
2014: Daniel Cardozo
2015: Jairo Eduardo Giraldo Castañeda

=== Costa Rica ===
2005: Jose De la O
2006: Ricardo Madriz
2007: Alonso Arrieta
2008: Carlos Pal
2009: Miguel Gatica
2010: Miguel Gatica
2011: Ricardo Madriz
2012: Marino Donato
2013: Miguel Gatica
2014: Miguel Gatica
2015: Miguel Gatica
2016: Marino Donato
2017: Mauricio Agüero
2018: Jun Feng

=== Croatia ===
2002: Ivan Rubelj
2003: Ognjen Cividini
2004: Filip Čeč
2005: Ivan Klarić
2006: Lovro Gašparac
2007: Grgur Petric Maretić
2008: Stjepan Sučić
2009: Niko Bačić
2010: Toni Portolan
2011: Grgur Petric Maretic
2012: Grgur Petric Maretic
2013: Grgur Petric Maretic
2014: Vjeran Horvat
2015: Stjepan Sučić
2016: Vjeran Horvat
2017: Vladimir Ivanović

=== Cyprus ===
2011: Alexendre Bakhtiarov
2012: Daniel Antonoiu
2013: Daniel Antonoiu
2014: Daniel Antonoiu
2015: Daniel Antonoiu

=== Czech Republic ===
1996: David Korejtko
1997: Lukáš Ladra
1998: Michal Srba
1999: Ondřej Baudyš
2000: Ondřej Baudyš
2001: Petr Nahodil
2002: Vladimír Komanický
2003: Petr Nahodil
2004: Ondřej Baudyš
2005: Martin Jůza
2006: Martin Jůza
2007: Tomáš Langer
2008: Petr Brožek
2009: Jan Kotrla
2010: Petr Nahodil
2011: Pavel Bednařík
2012: Martin Jůza
2013: Stanislav Cifka
2014: Stanislav Cifka
2015: Ondrej Stráský
2018: Tomáš Hanousek

=== Denmark ===
1995: Jesper Thrane
1996: Svend Geertsen
1997: Thomas Dall Jensen
1998: Timme Nyegaard
1999: Palle Poulsen
2000: Anton Lunau
2001: Niels Sanders Jensen
2002: Jonas Cleeman
2003: Stefan Petersen
2004: Søren Boll
2005: Rasmus Sibast
2006: Rasmus Sibast
2007: Tim Rasmussen
2008: Janus Bossow
2009: Thomas Enevoldsen
2010: Martin Dang
2011: Allan Christensen
2012: Allan Christensen
2013: Thomas Enevoldsen
2014: Martin Müller
2015: Martin Dang

=== Dominican Republic ===
2005: Pedro Pappaterra
2006: Carlos Joan Castillo Ruiz
2007: Pedro Pappaterra
2008: Rudy Ivan Jimenez
2009: Etienne Martinez
2010: Omar Bonilla
2011: Felix Osvaldo Rodriguez Acosta
2012: Ronald Rodriguez
2013: Ronald Rodriguez
2014: Pedro Pappaterra
2015: Pedro Pappaterra
2016: Caupolican Lopez Yapor
2017: Caupolican Lopez

=== Ecuador ===
2005: Mario Castillo
2006: Rafael Matovelle
2007: Francisco Miranda
2008: Francisco Arcos
2009: Jose Intriago Suarez
2010: Mario Castillo
2011: Francisco Cedeño
2012: Francisco Cedeño
2013: Daniel López
2014: Daniel Verdesoto
2015: Javier Castro

=== El Salvador ===
2010: Ricardo Cabrero
2011: Enrique Javier Lemus Molina
2012: Juan Navarro
2013: Ricardo Cabrero
2014: Ricardo Cabrero
2015: Salvador Diaz

=== England ===
English Nationals were discontinued after the 2006 Nationals with joint nationals with Scotland and Wales held since. However, in 2012 with the introduction of the World Magic Cup, England, Scotland and Wales once again have separate national champions. See Great Britain for national champions from 2007 to 2011.

2000: Ben Ronaldson
2001: Oliver Schneider
2002: Mark Waterhouse
2003: Atturi Björk
2004: John Ormerod
2005: Richard Moore
2006: Craig Stevenson
2012: Richard Bland
2013: Eduardo Sajgalik
2014: Fabrizio Anteri
2015: Fabrizio Anteri
2016: Eduardo Sajgalik
2017: Autumn Burchett
2018: Autumn Burchett

=== Estonia ===
2000: Tanel Lumiste
2001: Margus Liiber
2002: Risto Aaver
2003: Huko Aaspõllu
2004:
2005: Risto Aaver
2006: Erkki Sisask
2007: Aare Klooster
2008: Hannes Kerem
2009: Vahur-Peeter Liin
2010: Taavi Ludvi
2011: Taavi Ludvi
2012: Oliver Oks
2013: Hannes Kerem
2014: Hannes Kerem
2015: Hannes Kerem

=== Finland ===
1996: Tommi Hovi
1997:
1998:
1999:
2000: Lasse Larvanko
2001: Tomi Walamies
2002: Tomi Walamies
2003: Tomi Walamies
2004: Jussi Timonen
2005: Tuomo Nieminen
2006: Max Sjöblom
2007: Olli Hämäläinen
2008: Tero Niemi
2009: Mikko Airaksinen
2010: Jani Lindroos
2011: Markku Rikola
2012: Max Sjoblom
2013: Max Sjoblom
2014: Anssi Alkio
2015: Sami Tuomi

=== France ===
1994: Bertrand Lestrée
1995: Marc Hernandez
1996: Silvere Bonhomme
1997: Francois Fressin
1998: Fabien Demazeau
1999: Pierre Malherbaud
2000: Yann Hamon
2001: Pierre Malherbaud
2002: Sylvain Lauriol
2003: Stéphane Damizet
2004: Olivier Ruel
2005: Julien Goron
2006: Sylvain Lauriol
2007: Guillaume Matignon
2008: Christophe Peyronnel
2009: Gilles Mongilardi
2010: Julien Parez
2011: Armel Primot
2012: Raphaël Lévy
2013: Raphaël Lévy
2014: Jeremy Dezani
2015: Pierre Dagen
2016: Raphaël Lévy
2017: Alain Bardini
2018: Arnaud Hocquemiller

=== Germany ===
1995: Christoph Bilshausen
1996: Peer Kröger
1997: Oliver Krebs
1998: Dirk Hein
1999: Marco Blume
2000: André Konstanczer
2001: Daniel Zink
2002: Kai Budde
2003: Dirk Baberowski
2004: Torben Twiefel
2005: Hannes Scholz
2006: Maximilian Bracht
2007: Bodo Rösner
2008: Olaf Krzikalla
2009: Sebastian Thaler
2010: Dennis Johannsen
2011: Helge Nelson
2012: Bernd Brendemühl
2013: Jonas Köstler
2014: Patrick Dickmann
2015: Christian Seibold
2016: Patrick Dickmann
2017:
2018:

=== Great Britain ===
The Nationals of Great Britain replaced the English, Scottish, and Welsh Nationals from 2007 to 2011.

1999: Mark Wraith
2007: Craig Jones
2008: Jonathan Randle
2009: Daniel Gardner
2010: Joe Jackson
2011: Daniel Royde

=== Greece ===
1995: Christos Toulis
1996: Giraleas Lefteris
1997: Filippidis Giannis
1998: Panoutsos Fotis
1999: Papaioannou Ioannis
2000: Filippidis Giannis
2001: Kapalas Giorgos
2002: Dimitrios Chatsios
2003: Dimitris Kopsidas
2004: Simon Bertiou
2005: Vasilis Fatouros
2006: Harry Yarhas
2007: Petros Tziotis
2008: Theodoros Liapatis
2009: Kostas Skounakis
2010: Simon Bertiou
2011: Fondas Papadatos
2012: Fondas Papadatos
2013: Simon Bertiou
2014: Marios Angelopoulos
2015: Bill Chronopoulos

=== Guatemala ===
2008: Christopher Andres Virula Martinez
2009: Mariano Lemus
2010: Jeersson Arturo Soch. C.
2011: Rigoberto Castellan
2012: Rigoberto Castellan
2013: Carlos Emilio Hastedt
2014: Rigoberto Castellan
2015: Christopher Virula

=== Hong Kong ===
2000: Chi Fai Ng
2001:
2002:
2003:
2004:
2005: Lee Yin Cheung
2006: Tsang Wan Fai
2007: Yeung Sun Kit
2008: Lam Tsz Yeung
2009: Lee Shi Tian
2010: Sun Kit Yeung
2011: Kai Yip Lee
2012: Zhang Meng Qui
2013: Lee Shi Tian
2014: Lee Shi Tian
2015: Lee Shi Tian

=== Hungary ===
1996: Szabolcs Tószegi
1997: Miklós Tihor
1998: Gábor Papp
1999: Gábor Papp
2000: Zsolt Tököli
2001:
2002: Gergely Gárdos
2003: Gergely Gárdos
2004: Károly Lipták
2005: András Balogh
2006: Zoltán Szőke
2007: Tamás Nagy
2008: András Balogh
2009: Tamás Nagy
2010: Gergely Gulyas
2011: Tamás Nagy
2012: Tamás Nagy
2013: Tamás Nagy
2014: Tamás Glied
2015: Tamás Nagy

=== Iceland ===
1995: Júlíus Einarsson
1996: Jóhann Möller
1997: Jóhann Möller
1998: Alvin Orri Gíslason
1999: Einar Ágúst Baldvinsson
2000: Sigurður Örn Gunnarsson
2001: Yngvi Ómar Sighvatsson
2002: Gunnar Már Jóhannsson
2003: Stefán Aðalbjörnsson
2004: Guðbjörn Einarsson
2005: Guðbjörn Einarsson
2006: Jón Svan Sverrisson
2007: Marteinn Friðriksson
2008: Torfi Ásgeirsson
2009: Halldór Sigurður Kjartansson
2010: Halldór Sigurður Kjartansson
2011: Stefán Friðriksson
2012: Héðinn Haraldsson
2013: Alvin Orri Gíslason
2014: Ragnar Daði Sigurðsson
2015: Einar Ágúst Baldvinsson

=== Indonesia ===
2005: Fandy Cendrawira
2006: The Fei liem
2007: Anthony Subari
2008: Aziz Riphat
2009: Reza Erlangga
2010: Benny Soewanda
2011: Reza Erlangga
2012: Benny Soewanda
2013: Andreas Pranoto
2014: Kurniadi Patriawan
2015: Albert Budisanjaya

=== Ireland ===
1997: John Larkin
1998: Fergus Deffely
1999: Ger Norton
2000: John Larkin
2001: David Coghlan
2002: John Larkin
2003: Alan Meaney
2004: Gareth Cosgrave
2005: Darragh Long
2006: Gareth Middleton
2007: Conor Holmes
2008: Conor Kerr
2009: Chris Black
2010: Chris Black
2011: Alan Warnock
2012: Dara Butler (WMC)
2013: Marcin Sciesinski (WMC)
2014: John Larkin (WMC)
2015: Susann Heidemueller (WMC)
2016: Alex Ball (WMC)
2017: David Sea Murphy

=== Israel ===
2002: Roey Tzezan
2003: Baruchi Kimchi
2004: Uri Peleg
2005: Roey Tzezana
2006: Aylon Manor
2007: Eviatar Olpiner
2008: Asaf Shomer
2009: Yoav Amir
2010: Ido Faran
2011: Shalom Ashwal
2012: Niv Shmuely
2013: Shahar Shenhar
2014: Shahar Shenhar
2015: Shahar Shenhar

=== Italy ===
1995: Ivan Curina
1996: Andrea Paselli
1997: Alberto Morena
1998: Tommaso Natale
1999: Raffaele Lo Moro
2000: Luca Chiera
2001: Matteo Di Tomaso
2002: Stefano Fiore
2003: Daniele Canavesi
2004: Mario Pascoli
2005: Manuel Alvisi
2006: Manuel Alvisi
2007: Mario Pascoli
2008: William Cavaglieri
2009: Luca Ravagli
2010: Federico Ronchi
2011: Marcello Calvetto
2012: Samuele Estratti
2013: Samuele Estratti
2014: Andrea Mengucci
2015: Marco Cammilluzzi
2016: Andrea Mengucci
2017: Adriano Moscato
2018: Tian-Fa Mun

=== Japan ===
1996: Toshiki Tsukamoto
1997: Tadayoshi Komiya
1998: Toshiki Tsukamoto
1999: Higashino Masayuki
2000: Douyama Tsuyoshi
2001: Goro Matsuo
2002: Kazuhiko Mitsuya
2003: Koutarou Ootsuka
2004: Tsuyoshi Fujita
2005: Takuma Morofuji
2006: Katsuhiro Mori
2007: Masaya Kitayama
2008: Masashi Oiso
2009: Shuhei Nakamura
2010: Katsuhiro Mori
2011: Ryuuichirou Ishida
2012: Yuuya Watanabe
2013: Yuuya Watanabe
2014: Yuuya Watanabe
2015: Yuuya Watanabe
2016: Shouta Yasooka
2017: Kenta Harane
2018: Masahide Moriyama

=== Kazakhstan ===
2010: Marat Zhanseitov

=== Korea ===
1996: David Seo
1997: Son, Dong-Woo
1998: Kwak, Dong-Ho
1999: Jung, Heung-Jin
2000: Jung, Heung-Jin
2001: Kim, Ji-Hun
2002: Yoo, Sang-oh
2003: Lee, Ji-hoon
2004: Nam, Kyoung Geun
2005: Jun Hee Kang
2006: Jumin Lee
2007: Hyun Woo Jeong
2008: Jun Hee Kang
2009: Kim Jang-hong
2010: Hyun Woo Jeong
2011: Tae-jin Jang
2012: Cynic Kim
2013: Cynic Kim
2014: Sung Wook Nam
2015: Sung Wook Nam

=== Latvia ===
2005: Nikolai Precenieks
2006:
2007: Nikolajs Precenieks
2008: Igors Rudzitis
2009: Filips Kamkins
2010: Filips Kamkins
2011: Mihails Senins
2012: Andrejs Prost
2013: Andrejs Prost
2014: Andrejs Prost
2015: Andrejs Prost

=== Lithuania ===
2005: Ignas Stasevicius
2006:
2007: Andrius Jautakis
2008:
2009: Paulius Petkūnas
2010: Arturas Zinovjevas
2011: Tomas Šukaitis
2012: Gaudenis Vidugiris
2013: Gaudenis Vidugiris
2014: Gaudenis Vidugiris
2015: Gaudenis Vidugiris

=== Luxembourg ===
1998: Romain Glodt
1999:
2000:
2001:
2002: Fabrice Encelle
2003:
2004:
2005: Ken Geschwind
2006:
2007: Yin Zhang
2008: Charles Delvaux
2009: Przemyslaw Nagadowski
2010: Charles Thoss
2011: Przemyslaw Nagadowski
2012: Steve Hatto
2013: Steve Hatto
2014: Steve Hatto
2015: Steve Hatto
2016: Steve Hatto
2017: Tamas Repa
2018: Fernando Pensieri

=== Macedonia ===
2003: Vladimir Trajcevski
2004: Miro Popov
2005: Miro Popov
2006: Samoil Petreski
2007: Samoil Petreski
2008: Ivo Neskovik
2009: Vladimir Trajcevski
2010: Aleksandar Panajotov
2011: Andrej Loparski
2012: Andrej Loparski
2013: Dimitar Prodanov
2014: Vladimir Trajcevski
2015: Vladimir Trajcevski
2016: Miro Popov
2017: Miro Popov
2018: Samoil Petreski

=== Malaysia ===
2001: Ryan Siong Huat Soh
2002: Sim Han How
2003: Joe Soh
2004: Au Yong Wai Kin
2005: Chuen Hwa Tan
2006: Terry Soh
2007: Weng Sheng Wong
2008: Au Yong Wai Kin
2009: Joe Soh
2010: Jason Ng
2011: Lee Eing Yung
2012: Chee Choong Hiew
2013: Rick Lee
2014: Raymond Tan
2015: Raymond Tan

=== Malta ===
2005: Duncan Fleri
2006: Duncan Fleri
2007: Ernest Spiteri
2008: Calvin Cassar
2009: Jason Spiteri
2010: Mark Bonett
2011: Duncan Fleri
2015: Luke Vassallo

=== Mexico ===
1996: Arturo Ruedas
1997: Enric Rodamilans
1998: Julio César Ayala Vázquez
1999: Gerardo Godínez Estrada "Chiclick"
2000: Héctor Fuentes
2001: Francisco Barboza García
2002: Ivan Cortes
2003: Gustavo Chapela
2004: Enric Rodamilans
2005: Francisco Barboza García
2006: Fernando Domínguez Roldán
2007: Sabás Barriga
2008: Axel Martínez
2009: Fernando Domínguez Roldán
2010: Marcelino Freeman
2011: Isaías Cantú
2012: Isaías Cantú
2013: Dalibor Trnka
2014: Marcelino Freeman
2015: Marcelino Freeman

=== Netherlands ===
1995: Jan-Maarten Cobben
1996: Freek ten Cate
1997: Hans Eijmaal
1998: Tom van de Logt
1999: Alexander Witt
2000: Jesse Cornelissen
2001: Tom van de Logt
2002: Tom van de Logt
2003: Rogier Maaten
2004: Jeroen Remie
2005: Douwe van Noordenburg
2006: Kamiel Cornelissen
2007: Robert van Medevoort
2008: Tom van Lamoen
2009: Kevin Grove
2010: Bas Melis
2011: Ruben Snijdewind
2012: Jelger Wiegersma
2013: Raymond Veenis
2014: Frank Karsten
2015: Jelger Wiegersma

=== New Zealand ===
1997: Eoin Gibb
1998: Mark Simpson
1999: Mark Simpson
2000: Chris Wilson
2001: Roger Miller
2002: Cole Swannack
2003: Richard Grace
2004: Richard Grace
2005: Glenn Patel
2006: Timothy James Aitchison
2007: Kerel Laycock
2008: Dan Bretherton
2009: Jason Chung
2010: Scott Richards
2011: Luke Tsavousis
2012: Jason Chung
2013: Walter Macmurdo
2014: Jingwei Zheng
2015: Jason Chung
2016: Jason Chung
2017: Yida Guo
2018: Dan McKay

=== Northern Ireland ===
2012: Alan Warnock
2013: Alan Warnock
2014: Alan Warnock
2015: Stephen Madden
2016: Stephen Madden
2017: Desmond James Carson
2018: Adrian Donnelly

=== Norway ===
1998: Snorre Helvik
1999: Nicolai Herzog
2000: Bjorn Petter Jocumsen
2001: Nicolai Herzog
2002: Thomas Johansen
2003: Bjørn Petter Jocumsen
2004: Aleksander Dahl
2005: Nikolas Nygaard
2006: Øyvind Wefald Andersen
2007: Lars Engelberg
2008: André Moshølen
2009: Christian Bakkehaug
2010: Eivind Nitter
2011: Andreas Nordahl
2012: Andreas Nordahl
2013: Andreas Nordahl
2014: Nicolai Herzog
2015: Kenneth Ellingsen

=== Panama ===
2005: Joel Enrique Arauz
2006: Sergio Bonilla
2007: Omar Sanjur
2008: Jose Carvajal
2009: Saul Alvarado
2010: Saul Alvarado
2011: Eric Espino
2012: Nikola Mislov
2013: Saul Alvarado
2014: Ivan Oro
2015: Claro Renderos

=== Paraguay ===
2015: Oscar Mathias Bachmann

=== Peru ===
2001: Jorge Melgar Talavera
2002: Jorge Melgar Talavera
2003: Steven Vidalón
2004: Marco Sakugawa Tobaru
2005: Eduardo Pereyra
2006: Luis Bonilla

2007: Julio Rasmussen

2008: Giancarlo Arbulú
2009: Jose Arrieta
2010: Steven Vidalón
2011: Sergio Sanabio
2012: Sergio Sanabio
2013: Jose R. Rodriguez
2014: Jose Velarde
2015: Jose Velarde

=== Philippines ===
1996: Angel Diokno
1997: Rafael Lirag
1998: Sean Anthony Ortuoste
1999: Dino Yu
2000: Teddy Sy
2001: Reynerio M. Estacio Jr
2002: Mark Herrin
2003: Gerald Camangon
2004: Francis Profeta Jr.
2005: Mark Herrin
2006: JT Porter
2007: Jose Marie Sabale
2008: Bayani Manansala
2009: Francis Profeta Jr.
2010: Caesar W.Famorcan
2011: Jan Ang
2012: Gerald Camangon
2013: Richmon Tan
2014: Jason Ascalon
2015: Ronnie Paul Beley
2016: Michael Pul Hron
2017: Ryan Españo

=== Poland ===
1998: Paweł Karaszewski
1999: Jarosław Paszkiewicz
2000: Marcin Sadoś
2001: Paweł Karaszewski
2002: Adrian Brzegowy
2003: Przemysław Oberbek
2004: Sebastian Guliński
2005: Hubert Jaskólski
2006: Przemysław Oberbek
2007: Robert Szarata
2008: Tomasz Pędrakowski
2009: Sławomir Jabs
2010: Mikołaj Wyspiański
2011: Tomasz Figarski
2012: Tomek Pedrakowski
2013: Tomek Pedrakowski
2014: Marcin Staciwa
2015: Maciej Janik
2016: Grzegorz Kowalski
2017: Radek Kaczmarczyk
2018: Radek Kaczmarczyk

=== Portugal ===
1996: Rui Cordeiro
1997: Luis Figueira
1998: Eduardo Martins
1999: Hugo Machado
2000: Frederico Bastos
2001: Dinis Maia
2002: Kuniyoshi Ishii
2003: Tiago Chan
2004: Mauro Peleira
2005: Igor Barreiras
2006: Kuniyoshi Ishii
2007: Fabio Martins
2008: Marcio Carvalho
2009: Frederico Bastos
2010: Hugo Sa
2011: Hugo Vieira
2012: Mauro Peleira
2013: Rodrigo Borba
2014: Marcio Carvalho
2015: Marcio Carvalho
2016: Marcio Carvalho
2017: Ricardo Beja
2018:
2019:
2020 - 2024: Not Awarded
2025: Gonçalo Bragança
2026: Diogo Santos

=== Puerto Rico ===
2008: Danilo Prieto
2009: Braulio Rivera
2010: Jorge Muniz
2011: Luis Delfin Prieto
2012: Jorge Iramain
2013: Gabriel Nieves
2014: Nicolas Cuenca
2015: Gabriel Nieves

=== Romania ===
2008: Andrei Vuia
2009: Bogdan Vodă
2010: Raoul Trifan
2011: Mircea Posoiu
2012: Alexandru Dimitriu
2013: Alexandru Ștefănescu
2014: Rares-Glad Colomei
2015: Ciprian Catana

=== Russia ===
1999: Konstantin Firsov
2000: Konstantin Firsov
2001: Denis Kuznetsov
2002: Pavel Solyanko
2003: Albert Khamzin
2004: Artem Dushkevich
2005: Ruslan Dmitriev
2006: Vasily Tsapko
2007: Eugene Idzikovsky
2008: Alexander Privalov
2009: Andrey Kochurov
2010: Vladimir Mishustin
2011: Dmitry Olenin
2012: Egor Khodasevich
2013: Roman Masaladzhiu
2014: Dmitriy Butakov
2015: Denis Ulanov
2016: Alexander Semkin
2017: Evgeniy Shchotka

=== Scotland ===
Scottish Nationals were discontinued after the 2006 Nationals but the National Champion title returned in 2012 with the introduction of the World Magic Cup. Joint nationals with England and Wales were held from 2007 to 2011. See Great Britain for national champions 2007–2011.

1997: Martin Peden
1998: Sylvain Lauriol
2000: Edward Ross
2001: Darryl Tweedale
2002: Nik Iskandar
2003: Edward Ross
2004: David Chapman
2005: Ben Sanders
2006: Stephen Murray
2012: Andrew Morrison
2013: Stephen Murray
2014: Bradley Barclay
2015: Stephen Murray

=== Serbia ===
2002: Isidor Nikolić
2003: Đorđe Đorđević
2004: Obradović Vladimir
2005: Daniel Casnji
2006: Dragan Marošan
2007: Boris Bajgo
2008: Aleksa Telarov
2009: Dejan Šibul
2010: Aleksa Telarov
2011: Aleksa Telarov
2012: Aleksa Telarov
2013: Aleksa Telarov
2014: Aleksa Telarov
2015: Miodrag Kitanović
2016: Aleksa Telarov

=== Singapore ===
1998: Sam Lau
1999:
2000:
2001: Junyang Ang
2002:
2003: Kok Seng Ong
2004:
2005: Sam Lei Kang Lau
2006:
2007: Ji Tan Rou
2008: Yong Han Choo
2009: Khoo Aik Seng
2010: Teng Chek Lim
2011: Lee Benedict
2012: Kelvin Chew
2013: Kelvin Chew
2014: Kelvin Chew
2015: Chapman Sim

=== Slovakia ===
1996: Peter Marcinko
1997: Rasto Stranak
1998: Rasto Stranak
1999: Juraj Smrek
2000: Juraj Smrek
2001: Michal Jedlicka
2002: Tomas Tomecek
2003: Matej Zatlkaj
2004: Rasto Stranak
2005: Robert Jurkovic
2006: Filip Valis
2007: Filip Valis
2008: Filip Valis
2009: Janos Csomos
2010: Ivan Floch
2011: Ivan Floch
2012: Robert Jurkovic
2013: Ivan Floch
2014: Ivan Floch
2015: Ivan Floch

=== Slovenia ===
2002: Primoz Lavs
2003:
2004:
2005: Andrej Renko
2006:
2007:
2008: Marko Stokelj
2009: Primoz Lavs
2010: Tine Rus
2011: Bojan Zunko
2012: Robin Dolar
2013: Robin Dolar
2014: Robin Dolar
2015: Robin Dolar

=== South Africa ===
2001: Russell Tanchel
2002: Christiaan Du Plessis
2003:
2004: Marco Panavaro
2005: Michael Nurse
2006: Michael Nurse
2007: Seraj Haroun
2008: Adam Katz
2009: Claude Hurlimaar
2010: Dale Fienburg
2011: James Combrink
2012: James Combrink
2013: Craig Leach
2014: Keraan Chetty
2015: Sinan Effendi
2016: Sinan Effendi
2017: Kaloyan Petkov

=== Spain ===
2000: Carlos Barrado
2001: Daniel Bethencourt
2002: Andres Ortega Montero
2003: Francisco Castro
2004: Aniol Alcaraz Coca
2005: Omar Rohner
2006: Javier Domínguez
2007: Ricardo Vicente
2008: Omar Sagol
2009: Enric Martí
2010: Aníbal Carbonero
2011: Joel Calafell
2012: Joel Calafell
2013: Juan Carlos Adebo Diaz
2014: Javier Domínguez
2015: Antonio Del Moral Leon

=== Sweden ===
1995: Dan Hörning
1996: Leon Lindbäck
1997: Nikolai Weibull
1998: Matti Leivo
1999: Jimmy Öman
2000: Jimmy Öman
2001: Johan Johannesson
2002: Anton Jonsson
2003: Bertil Elfgren
2004: Carl Thille
2005: Mikael Polgary
2006: Tobias Ström
2007: Matthias Agerberg
2008: Fabian Sjöblom
2009: Tore Hedbäck
2010: Anders Melin
2011: Martin Berlin
2012: Denniz Rachid
2013: Joel Larsson
2014: Joel Larsson
2015: Joel Larsson

=== Switzerland ===
1995: Amiel Feldmann
1996: Amiel Feldmann
1997: Amiel Feldmann
1998: Timur Dogan
1999:
2000: Christian Fehr
2001: Dave Montreuil
2002: Christian Kreher
2003: Andrea Curti
2004: Bruno Carvalho
2005: Daniel Oppliger
2006: Régis Blanc
2007: Manuel Bucher
2008: Mark Schwass
2009: Tommi Lindgren
2010: Andreas Ganz
2011: Matthias Künzler
2012: Andreas Ganz
2013: Andreas Ganz
2014: Nico Bohny
2015: Julian Felix Flury
2016: Andreas Ganz
2017: Simon Leigh
2018: Michael Hitz

=== Thailand ===
2002: Veerapat Sirilertvorakul
2003: Siru Phantalakun
2004: Siru Phantalakun
2005: Mongkol Tachasukjai
2006: Siru Phantalakun
2007: Jakguy Subcharoen
2008: Sirichai Chaisuthamporn
2009: Jakguy Subcharoen
2010: Kampanart Wiriyaampon
2011: Suttipong Popitukgul
2012: Mat Marr
2013: Sethsilp Chanpleng
2014:
2015: Veerapat Sirilertvorakul

=== Turkey ===
1998: Yusuf Kemal Vefa
1999: Yusuf Kemal Vefa
2000: Gökhan Sarıışık
2001: Onur Konuralp
2002: Siyar Erzen
2003: Eda Bilsel
2004: Yusuf Kemal Vefa
2005: Yusuf Kemal Vefa
2006: Cem Erdoğan
2007: Aras Senyuz
2008: Emir Alimoglu
2009: Cerag Kucukcaglayan
2010: Cem Erdoğan
2011: Emir Alimoglu
2012: Sureyya Dipsar
2013: Emir Alimoglu
2014: Yusuf Kemal Vefa
2015: Osman Ozguney

=== Ukraine ===
2001: Artem Kozachuk
2002: Andrey Rybalchenko
2003:
2004: Sergey Kuznetsov
2005: Yaroslav Shlyakhov
2006: Oleksandr Gerasymenko
2007: Oleksandr Gerasymenko
2008: Yury Babych
2009: Artem Kozachuk
2010: Igor Paslavskyy
2011: Iurii Babych
2012: Oleksandr Onosov
2013: Mike Krasnitski
2014: Sergiy Sushalskyy
2015: Oleg Plisov

=== United Arab Emirates ===
Nationals in the United Arab Emirates were discontinued after the 2002 nationals.

2000: Rusel Mirara
2001:
2002: Mark Marsden

United Kingdom and Northern Ireland

1996: Robert Salmon

=== United States ===
1994: Bo Bell
1995: Mark Justice
1996: Dennis Bentley
1997: Justin Gary
1998: Matt Linde
1999: Kyle Rose
2000: Jon Finkel
2001: Trevor Blackwell
2002: Eugene Harvey
2003: Joshua Wagener
2004: Craig Krempels
2005: Antonino De Rosa
2006: Paul Cheon
2007: Luis Scott-Vargas
2008: Michael Jacob
2009: Charles Gindy
2010: Josh Utter-Leyton
2011: Ali Aintrazi
2012: Brian Kibler
2013: Josh Utter-Leyton
2014: Owen Turtenwald
2015: Mike Sigrist
2016: Owen Turtenwald
2017: Oliver Tomajko
2018: Dylan Brown

=== Uruguay ===
1999: Gabriel Aziz
2000: Fernando Veiga
2001: Rodrigo Asuaga
2002: Alejandro Betschart
2003: Jorge Sierra
2004: Gerardo Silva
2005: Mauro Betschart
2006: Ernesto Delgado
2007: Alejandro Betschart
2008: Jorge Sierra
2009: Juan Odriozola
2010: Alejandro Betschart
2011: Guillermo Gruszka
2012: Nicolás Righetti
2013: Martin Castillo
2014: Sebastian Martinez
2015: Matias Roubaud

=== Venezuela ===
2001: Eduardo Muñoz
2002: Marlon García
2003: Daniele D'Aversa
2004: Daniel Fior
2005: Frankin Montero
2006: Andres Perez
2007: Marlon García
2008: Jose Nassif
2009: Sergio Vegas
2010: Jesus Enrique Somaza Mendoza
2011: Pedro Elias Gutierrez
2012: Humberto Patarca
2013: Daniel Fior
2014: Daniel Fior
2015: Daniel Fior
2016: Daniel Fior
2017: Daniel Fior

=== Wales ===
Welsh Nationals were discontinued after the 2006 Nationals but the Welsh National Champion was reintroduced with the World Magic Cup in 2012. Joint nationals with England and Scotland were held between 2007 and 2011. See Great Britain for national champions from 2007 to 2011.

2000: Stephen Brown
2001: Phil Brett
2002: Dan Allen
2003: Roy Williams
2004: Richard Edbury
2005: Gareth Beamish
2012: Lewis McLeod
2013: Pip Griffiths
2014: Pip Griffiths
2015: Pip Griffiths
2016: Ben Jones
2017: Pip Griffiths

== Continental Championships ==
The continental championships were tournaments held in late summer before the World Championship, inviting top players from their geographical region. All these competitions were discontinued, long before nationals championships were eventually abandoned, too. The last such event was the European championship, held in 2003.

=== Asian Pacific Region ===
1997: Nathan Russell (Australia)
1998: Satoshi Nakamura (Japan)
1999: Masaya Mori (Japan)
2000: Masaya Mori (Japan)
2001: Jin Okamoto (Japan)

=== Europe ===
1998: Sturla Bingen (Norway)
1999: Nicolai Herzog (Norway)
2000: Noah Boeken (Netherlands)
2001: Eivind Nitter (Norway)
2002: David Brucker (Germany)
2003: Nicolai Herzog (Norway)

=== Latin America ===
2000: Gustavo Chapela Gaxiola (Mexico)
2001: Scott Richards (Uruguay)

== See also ==
- Magic: The Gathering World Championship
