= Javier Domínguez =

Spanish Magic: The Gathering card player

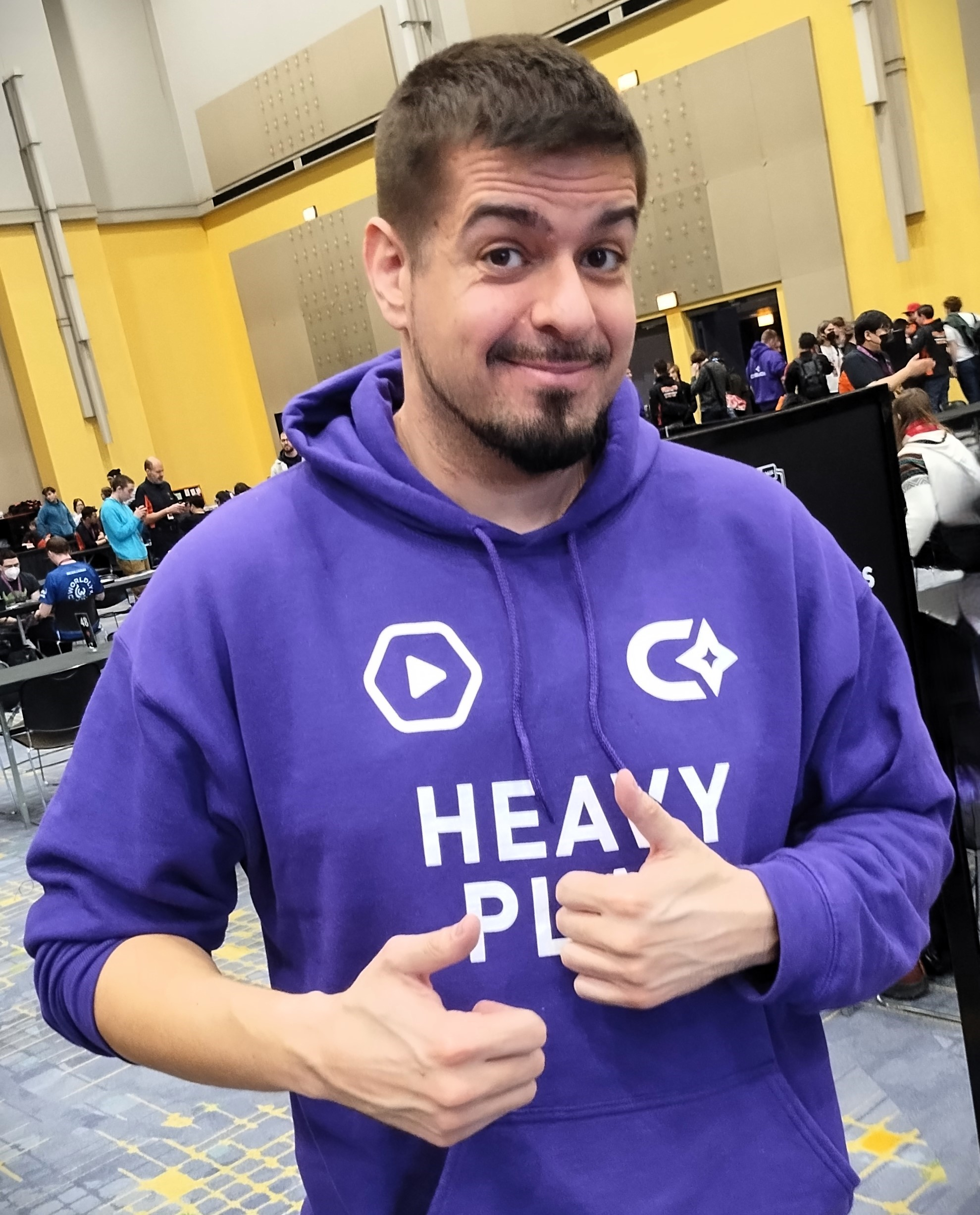
- Domínguez at MagicCon Chicago in 2025
- Nickname: Thalai
- Born: 9 March 1987 (age 39)
- Pro Tour debut: 2003
- Pro Tour wins (Top 8): 11 (1 wins)
- Grand Prix wins (Top 8): 10 (2 wins)

Javier Domínguez Gómez, nicknamed "Thalai", is a Spanish card player, specializing in poker and Magic: The Gathering. He was twice a Magic: The Gathering World Champion, in 2018 and 2024, and Magic: The Gathering Player of the Year in 2024. In 2026 he was inducted into the Magic Pro Tour Hall of Fame.

== Early life and education ==
Javier Domínguez was born in Barcelona in 1987 and grew up in the village of Palau-solità i Plegamans. He began playing Magic: The Gathering aged 13 or 14, when his cousin brought some cards to a family meal, and began playing tournaments a year later. He won his first MTG Pro Tour qualifier at the age of 16 and played his first Pro Tour event in New Orleans in 2003 against Raphaël Lévy. In September 2006, at the age of 19, he won the Spanish National Magic Championship.

Domínguez read mathematics at university for a year and then psychology for two before dropping out.

== Poker career ==
While at university, Domínguez lost interest in Magic and preferred poker, playing the latter competitively in his twenties. He said that Magic was more fun, while poker was more like work. By 2011 he had won a total of half a million dollars in online poker tournaments and was a teacher at online school EducaPoker.

In early 2011, Domínguez, using the user name "El_Cañonero", was selected for the PokerStars online team among 15 players out of 4500 applicants. That March, he came fifth in a PokerStars Sunday Million tournament and won $22,430. He won a Sunday Second Chance for $41,436 in July 2011, and then another PokerStars tournament for $16,000 that November. In March 2012, he won $13,000 in the European Poker Tour in Madrid, finishing 21st.

== Magic career ==
In 2013, Domínguez took a break from poker to improve at Magic. He won a Legacy format MTG Grand Prix in Paris in 2014, then shared a Team Grand Prix win in Rotterdam in 2016 with Portuguese player Márcio Carvalho and Argentinian Luis Salvatto. Still, by October 2017, Domínguez had never finished in the top 8 in any invitation-only MTG Pro Tour event, so it was a surprise when he came second place at that year's Magic: The Gathering World Championship in Boston, only losing in the finals to American William Jensen.

In September of the next year, Domínguez won the 2018 Magic: The Gathering World Championship in Las Vegas. In the semi-finals, he eliminated Israeli player Shahar Shenhar, the only player who had ever won the Championship twice, and in the finals he defeated his friend and future teammate Grzegorz Kowalski. He was the first Spanish player to win the Championship. He won $100,000, and the right to be featured on a Magic card; the red "Fervent Champion", released in Throne of Eldraine in 2019. He made the Top 8 of an MTG Grand Prix two weeks later.

Domínguez served as captain of the Spanish team for the MTG World Cup held in Barcelona later the same year. He placed in the Top 8 of two of the next Mythic Championships. At the end of 2018, Domínguez was one of the first 32 players invited to the Magic Pro League, the esports Player's Tour equivalent, and in 2019, Domínguez won the second MTG Arena Mythic Championship, defeating French player Jean-Emmanuel Depraz in the finals.

Domínguez continued playing competitive poker even after becoming a Magic champion, taking third place in the Unibet Open Milano in 2022, and winning €40,000. He also played in the main event of the European Poker Tour in Prague in December 2024, though was eliminated in the first day. Playing poker alongside him was Czech Magic champion Martin Jůza.

In October 2024, Domínguez became the second player to ever win the Magic: The Gathering World Championship twice, matching Shahar Shenhar. He defeated American Seth Manfield in the semifinals, winning their last three games after losing the first two, and defeated former teammate Márcio Carvalho in the finals in three consecutive games. Their match made Domínguez and Carvalho the only two players to ever compete in three World Championship finals. By winning, Domínguez again won $100,000, and placement on a card to be determined later. The victory also made him the Magic: The Gathering Player of the Year, which would otherwise have gone to Manfield; Domínguez was only the second Magic player to win World Champion and Player of the Year in the same season, after Kai Budde. In December 2024, Domínguez again won the Spanish National Magic Championship in Soria.

== Magic philosophy ==
Domínguez says Magic teaches you how to lose, on the grounds that even professionals have winning percentages around 60%, and that he plays not to win but to have a good time. He greatly admires Spanish tennis player Rafael Nadal, known for his comebacks; when, in the semifinals of his 2024 World Championship win, he lost the first two games against American Seth Manfield, then came back to win the next three games, he says that was a real "Nadalada".

Domínguez says his great talent is not learning quickly, but knowing how to work hard to prepare himself. Whenever a new Magic set comes out, he dedicates one to two months at six to eight hours each day to preparation. Immediately before a tournament, he only interrupts his card preparation to eat and to exercise at the gym, because he needs to be physically fit to maintain the ten hour days of card play. Even when he doesn't have a tournament upcoming, he plays Arena for a few hours each day to maintain his level. He says some of his poker skills carry over to Magic, such as making plays specifically to conceal information from the opponent.
