= Depraz =

Depraz is a surname found in France. Notable people with this surname include:

- Jean-Emmanuel Depraz (born 1994), French player of Magic: The Gathering
- Natalie Depraz (born 1964), French philosopher
- Xavier Depraz (1926–1994), French actor and opera singer
