= Stanislav Cifka =

Czech Magic: The Gathering player (born 1987)

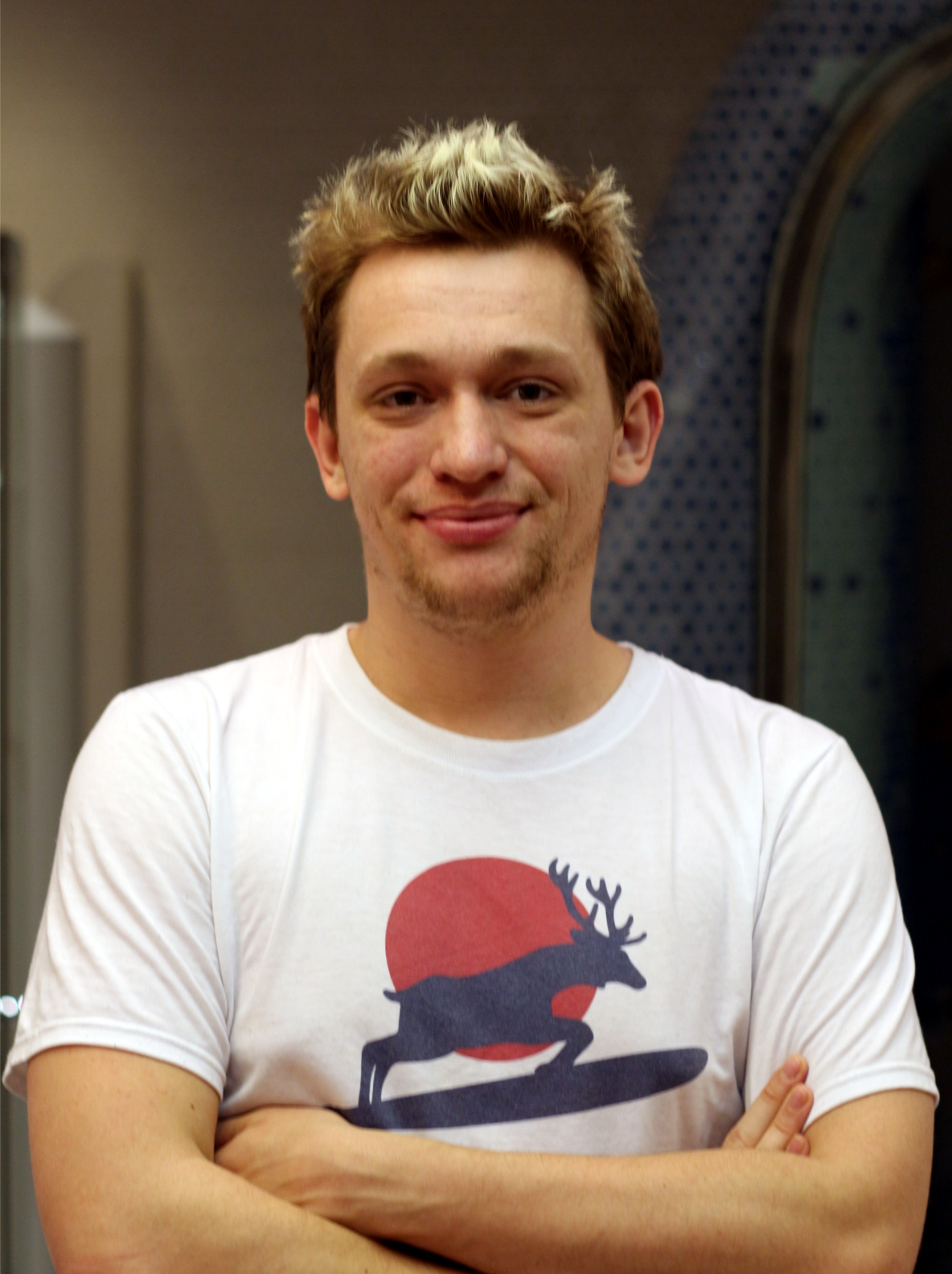
- Cifka in 2017
- Born: 1987 (age 38–39)
- Nationality: Czech
- Pro Tour debut: Pro Tour Prague 2006
- Winnings: US$126,450
- Pro Tour wins (Top 8): 1 (2)
- Grand Prix wins (Top 8): 0 (3)
- Lifetime Pro Points: 203

Esports career information
- Games: Hearthstone; Artifact
- Playing career: 2014–present
- Handle: StanCifka

Team history
- 2015: Luminosity Gaming
- 2015–2017: Misfits
- 2018–2019: Omnislash
- Chess career
- Title: FIDE Master (2006)
- Peak rating: 2439 (July 2008)

Stanislav Cifka is a Czech chess, poker, Magic: the Gathering, Hearthstone, and Artifact player. He is also a FIDE master in chess. His esports alias is simply StanCifka, a contraction or anglicization of his name.

== Career ==
=== Magic: the Gathering ===
He was formerly active in Magic: the Gathering before Hearthstone was released. He is best known for winning Pro Tour Return to Ravnica in 2012, which is one of the top-tier tournaments of the game. He lost only one match. He was given a special invitation by Wizards of the Coast to play in an exhibition match in Pro Tour 25th Anniversary due to his achievement outside Magic.

=== Hearthstone ===
Cifka started playing the PC collectible card game Hearthstone when it was released. Cifka was part of Luminosity Gaming for part of 2015. In October 2015 Cifka broke Thijs "ThijsNL" Molendijk's winning streak by winning the StarLadder finals. As of May 2018 he is ranked 1st by gosugamers.net, a site that ranks players worldwide.

In 2017, Cifka led the Czech National Team to a first-place finish in the 2017 Hearthstone Global Games. In January 2018, he joined team Omnislash. He was crowned winner of the event after beating Jason Chan (Amaz) in a "Hearthstone-Players-Finals" in August 2018.

=== Artifact ===
In November 2018, Cifka posted a video to YouTube announcing that he would be retiring from Hearthstone to pursue a career in Artifact. Cifka announced in February 2019 that he left team Omnislash, due to the team's focus on Hearthstone over Artifact.

== Magic: The Gathering achievements ==
Season	Event type	Location	Format	Date	Rank
2012–13	Grand Prix	San Jose	Team Limited	13–14 October 2012	4
2012–13	Pro Tour	Seattle	Modern and Booster Draft	19–21 October 2012	1
2012–13	Grand Prix	Sydney	Sealed and Booster Draft	19–20 January 2013	7
2013–14	World Magic Cup	Amsterdam	National team	2–4 August 2013	3
2013–14	Grand Prix	Vienna	Standard	30 November–1 December 2013	5
2013–14	Pro Tour	Atlanta	Block Constructed and Booster Draft	16–18 May 2013	7

Last updated: 5 November 2014
Source: Event Coverage at Wizards.com

Preceded by Martin Jůza	Magic Czech National Champion; 2013–2014	Succeeded by Ondrej Stráský
