= Randy Buehler =

American game developer and Magic: The Gathering player

Randolph E. Buehler Jr.
- Born: November 21, 1971 (age 54)
- Nationality: American
- Pro Tour debut: 1997 Pro Tour Chicago
- Winnings: US$51,685
- Pro Tour wins (Top 8): 1 (1)
- Grand Prix wins (Top 8): 1 (7)
- Lifetime Pro Points: 126
- Planeswalker Level: 42 (Battlemage)

Randolph E. "Randy" Buehler Jr. is an American game developer. He was the Vice President of Digital Gaming at Wizards of the Coast, Inc., now a subsidiary of Hasbro, Inc., as well as the commentator for the Magic Pro Tour. He was formerly a weekly writer for Magicthegathering.com's "Latest Developments" column and former Magic Pro Tour player.

== Before Wizards of the Coast ==
Buehler started playing Magic: The Gathering just before the Homelands set came out. After initially playing Magic with roommates at Carnegie Mellon University, Buehler gained a fierce interest in tournament level Magic. Many Pro Tour Qualifier and Grand Prix tournaments provided valuable experience that would lead to Buehler's first Pro Tour win (Pro Tour-Chicago 1997), which was also his first Pro Tour appearance.

While working on his Ph.D. in History and Philosophy of Quantum Mechanics, Buehler's interest in school began to fade as his financial successes in Magic: the Gathering yielded a satisfactory lifestyle, so he took a two-year leave of absence from school to pursue his passion.

A favorite style of play for him has always been card drawing. His famous decks include CMU Blue and Draw Go. When he won Pro Tour-Chicago '97 he used a Necropotence deck.

He gained the attention of Wizards of the Coast with his skill on the Magic Pro Tour and was eventually offered a position at Magic Research and Development as a developer. Before he could return to college from his two-year leave, Buehler decided to take the job. As a developer, his responsibilities would include testing out cards before they were printed to adjust and tweak them for power level reasons and fairness.

== At Wizards of the Coast ==
When Buehler arrived at Magic R&D, development for the Invasion set was just beginning. Since then, he was a developer in many sets. His first assignment as a lead developer was in the Odyssey set, and in the summer of 2001 Randy Buehler was promoted to the position of lead developer of all Magic.

On January 4, 2002, Randy Buehler published the first Magicthegathering.com "Latest Developments" column, wherein a developer writes about a topic related to Magic development. On January 30, 2004 Buehler announced that he would leave "Latest Developments" and be succeeded by Aaron Forsythe. For several years, Buehler served as a commentator for the Magic Pro Tour webcasts, joined by co-hosts such as Mike Flores. He also served as the host of the monthly Magic: the Gathering podcasts, which covered new sets and upcoming tournaments, and as the floor reporter for the Pro Tour podcasts, which feature ongoing coverage of each Pro Tour event.

Randy Buehler was in charge of the Dungeons & Dragons Insider and Gleemax community sites after the release of 4th edition of Dungeons & Dragons. He was laid off, like Dave Noonan and Jonathan Tweet, among others, on December 2, 2008, for Wizards of the Coast to better focus both the digital team on Magic Online and D&D Insider.

== At Mind Control Software ==
As of 2009, Randy Buehler was Vice President of Business Strategy at Mind Control Software. There, he was working with Richard Garfield and Skaff Elias on Mind Twist, a free-to-play strategy game. The project generated no news after 2009 and Mind Control closed its doors (as Electrified Software) in 2013.

== Personal life ==
Buehler is married to fellow Wizards employee and Magic player Del Laugel, who is the Magic Lead Editor. The couple have a daughter, Kira Elizabeth Buehler.

== Accomplishments ==
Season	Event type	Location	Format	Date	Rank
1997–98	Pro Tour	Chicago	Extended	10–12 October 1997	1
1997–98	Grand Prix	Atlanta	Limited	27–28 March 1998	1
1997–98	Grand Prix	Antwerp	Limited	25–26 April 1998	5
1997–98	Grand Prix	Indianapolis	Limited	27–28 June 1998	5
1998–99	Grand Prix	Boston	Block Constructed	5–6 September 1998	2
1998–99	Grand Prix	Lisbon	Block Constructed	12–13 September 1998	3
1998–99	Grand Prix	Vienna	Extended	13–14 March 1999	5
1998–99	Grand Prix	Kansas City	Extended	27–28 March 1999	6

Last updated: 20 April 2009
Source: Wizards.com

Buehler was Pro Tour Rookie of the Year in the 1997–98 season. He was inducted into the Magic: The Gathering Hall of Fame in 2007 at the World Championship in New York City.

Preceded by n/a	Magic: The Gathering Rookie of the Year; 1998	Succeeded by (Germany) Dirk Baberowski
