= Shahar Shenhar =

Israeli-American Magic: The Gathering player

Shahar Shenhar שחר שחנר
- Nationality: (Israel) Israeli (United States) American
- Pro Tour debut: Pro Tour Paris 2011
- Winnings: US$235,350
- Pro Tour wins (Top 8): 0 (0)
- Grand Prix wins (Top 8): 4 (10)
- Lifetime Pro Points: 209

Shahar Shenhar (Hebrew: שחר שנחר) is an Israeli-American Magic: The Gathering player. In the thirty-one years since the first Magic: The Gathering World Championship, he is the first of only 3 people alongside Javier Dominguez and Seth Manfield to have won the competition more than once, winning the tournament in 2013 and 2014.

== Magic: The Gathering ==
=== Career ===
Introduced to Magic: The Gathering in 2007 at age 14, Shenhar quickly picked up the game at a competitive level, and played his first Pro Tour in 2011, Pro Tour Paris. A 38th-place finish qualified him for the next Pro Tour, and later that season, in San Diego, he reached the top eight of a Grand Prix event for the first time. He ended up winning the event, beating Richard Bland in the final. Less than six months later, at Grand Prix Salt Lake City, Shenhar won his second Grand Prix title. Thanks to his performances, he reached Platinum status in the Pro Players Club at the end of the 2011–12 season.

In the 2012–13 season, Shahar posted his best Pro Tour finish to date, a 22nd-place finish at Pro Tour Gatecrash in Montreal. He made an additional two Grand Prix top eights, at Columbus and Verona, and was at the end of the season rewarded with an invitation to the 2013 World Championship, as well as the 2013 World Magic Cup as the captain of the Israeli national team. Despite being the youngest participant in the event, Shenhar made it all the way to the top four, where he defeated Ben Stark in the semifinal before facing Reid Duke in the final. Duke's Hexproof deck was considered a heavy favorite against Shenhar's Blue-White-Red Control deck. Duke took a 2–0 lead in the best-of-five match, but Shenhar won the next three games to win the match 3–2. As such, Shenhar was crowned the 2013 World Champion. At the World Magic Cup, Shenhar finished 16th with the Israeli team, losing to eventual champions France in the last round to miss the top eight.

Though Shenhar's performances at the Pro Tour during the 2013–14 season were unspectacular, with his best finish being 74th place at Pro Tour Journey into Nyx in Atlanta, he did win his third Grand Prix event, Grand Prix Houston, and qualified for the 2014 World Championship as the reigning champion, as well as the 2014 World Magic Cup as the Israeli captain. Finishing 4th after the Swiss rounds, beating Shaun McLaren on tiebreakers, Shenhar advanced to the top four, where he faced the winner of the 2012 event, Yuuya Watanabe. A 3–1 winner, Shenhar then faced Hall of Famer Patrick Chapin in the final. Shenhar ended up defeating Chapin 3–0 to claim his second World Championship title. This made Shenhar both the first repeat winner and the first to win it in consecutive years. At the World Magic Cup, Israel again came close to a top eight finish, but lost to South Korea in the final round to finish 10th. Shenhar and his 2013–14 win were featured in the documentary Enter the Battlefield - Life on the Magic: The Gathering Pro Tour.

Shenhar posted stellar results at the 2014–15 Pro Tours, finishing 22nd, 51st, 96th and 47th in consecutive events. However, a Pro Tour top eight still eluded him. Alongside teammates Tom Martell and Paulo Vitor Damo da Rosa, Shenhar finished second at Grand Prix Nashville, and he also put up a fifth-place finish at Grand Prix Ottawa. As the World Champion, he was automatically granted Platinum status at the end of the season, but he would have had enough points even if this wasn't the case. Shahar is one of only four players to have reached Platinum status every season since the 2012 Professional Play changes, the others being Josh Utter-Leyton, Owen Turtenwald and Yuuya Watanabe.

== Achievements ==
Season	Event type	Location	Format	Date	Rank
2011	Grand Prix	San Diego	Sealed and Booster Draft	12–13 November 2011	1
2012	Grand Prix	Salt Lake City	Standard	31 March – 1 April 2012	1
2012–13	Grand Prix	Columbus	Modern	21–22 July 2012	5
2012–13	Grand Prix	Verona	Standard	9–10 March 2013	7
2013–14	Grand Prix	Houston	Sealed and Booster Draft	15–16 June 2013	1
2013–14	Worlds	Amsterdam	Special	31 July – 4 August 2013	1
2014–15	Grand Prix	Nashville	Team Limited	1–2 November 2014	2
2014–15	Grand Prix	Ottawa	Sealed and Booster Draft	22–23 November 2014	5
2014–15	Worlds	Nice	Special	2–7 December 2014	1
2015–16	Grand Prix	Detroit	Team Limited	15–16 August 2015	4
2017–18	Grand Prix	Portland	Standard	18–19 November 2017	1
2018	Worlds	Las Vegas	Special	21-23 August 2018	4

Last updated: 17 August 2015
Source: Event Coverage at Wizards.com

Preceded by Niv Shmuely	Magic Israeli National Champion; 2013, 2014, 2015	Succeeded by Incumbent
Preceded by (Japan) Yuuya Watanabe	Magic World Champion; 2013, 2014	Succeeded by (United States) Seth Manfield
