= Magic: The Gathering World Championship =

Annual trading card game tournament

Magic: The Gathering World Championships
Year	Winner	Held in
1994	Zak Dolan	Milwaukee, WI, United States
1995	Alexander Blumke	Seattle, WA, United States
1996	Tom Chanpheng	Seattle, WA, United States
1997	Jakub Slemr	Seattle, WA, United States
1998	Brian Selden	Seattle, WA, United States
1999	Kai Budde	Yokohama, Japan
2000	Jon Finkel	Brussels, Belgium
2001	Tom van de Logt	Toronto, ON, Canada
2002	Carlos Romão	Sydney, Australia
2003	Daniel Zink	Berlin, Germany
2004	Julien Nuijten	San Francisco, CA, United States
2005	Katsuhiro Mori	Yokohama, Japan
2006	Makihito Mihara	Paris, France
2007	Uri Peleg	New York City, NY, United States
2008	Antti Malin	Memphis, TN, United States
2009	André Coimbra	Rome, Italy
2010	Guillaume Matignon	Chiba, Japan
2011	Jun'ya Iyanaga	San Francisco, CA, United States
2012	Yuuya Watanabe*	Seattle, WA, United States
2013	Shahar Shenhar (1)	Amsterdam, Netherlands
2014	Shahar Shenhar (2)	Nice, France
2015	Seth Manfield (1)	Seattle, WA, United States
2016	Brian Braun-Duin	Seattle, WA, United States
2017	William Jensen	Boston, MA, United States
2018	Javier Dominguez (1)	Las Vegas, NV, United States
2019	Paulo Vitor Damo da Rosa	Honolulu, HI, United States
2021	Yuta Takahashi	MTG Arena
2022	Nathan Steuer	Las Vegas, NV, United States (on MTG Arena)
2023	Jean-Emmanuel Depraz	Las Vegas, NV, United States
2024	Javier Dominguez (2)	Las Vegas, NV, United States
2025	Seth Manfield (2)	Seattle, WA, United States
* Watanabe won the Players Championship

The Magic: The Gathering World Championships (Worlds) have been held annually since 1994. It is the most important tournament in the game of Magic: The Gathering, offering cash prizes of up to $100,000 to the winners. With the exception of the first edition, Worlds is an invitation-only event, and from 1996 to 2011 World was the last event of each Pro Tour season. The invitees were mostly top finishers from the National championships, the top-ranked players of the DCI and high-level pro players. Since 2012 the World Championships are held after the season and the most successful 16 or 24 players have been invited to the tournament.

After the first five World Championships were all held in the United States, Worlds have since been held in Japan, Australia and various countries in Europe. Besides the main event Worlds were always a huge gathering of Magic players, who came to watch the pros and compete in side events.

After the 2011 season, the World Championship was briefly replaced by the Magic Players Championship. The top 16 pro players selected due to various criteria were invited to the Players Championship. In 2013 the tournament was renamed to 'World Championship' once again. From 2014 to 2018 the tournament was expanded to 24 competitors, but is going back to 16 players for the 2019 Worlds.

The large World Championships, held until 2011, also included a national team portion where the top players from each National Championship engaged in a separate competition. The decision to abandon large World Championships would have left the community without such an event. In part due to heavy demand by the players, Wizards of the Coast decided to create a replacement after initially abandoning the national team competition. A new team competition, the World Magic Cup was held annually from 2012 to 2017.

The most successful contestants are Shahar Shenhar, Javier Dominguez, and Seth Manfield all of whom have won the Worlds twice. In the team portion the United States are by far the most successful country.

== History ==
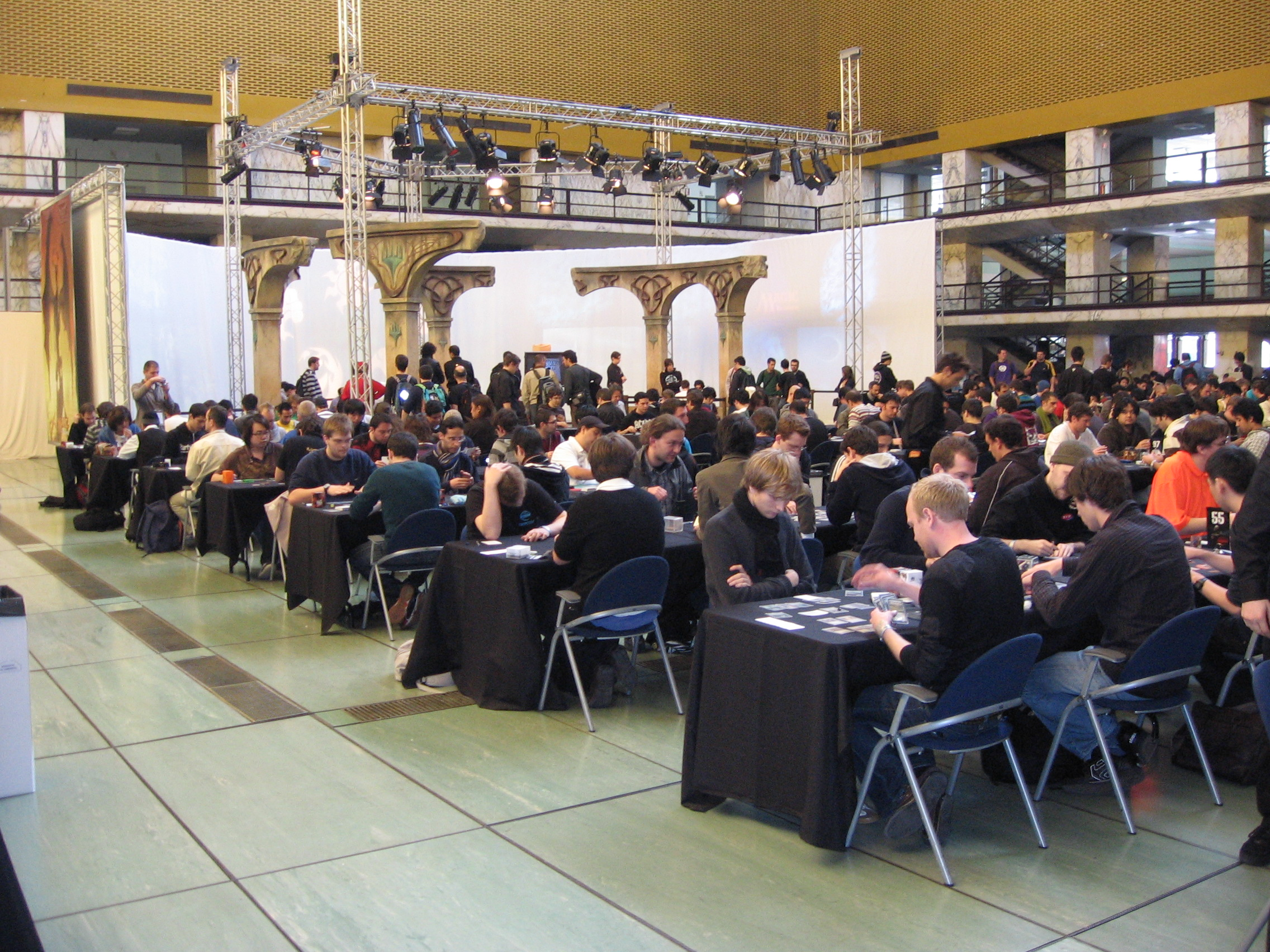
A view over the hall at the 2009 Magic Worlds in Rome

The first World Championship was held in 1994 at the Gen Con fair in Milwaukee. The tournament was open to all competitors, and its mode was single-elimination.

After 15 years in which the Worlds underwent only minor changes, major changes were announced in 2011. For 2012, the World Championships would be replaced by a 16-player invitational event named the Magic: The Gathering Players Championship. The Pro Player of the Year title was discontinued in favor of the Players Championship, thus attempting to merge the major individual titles, the World Champion and the Pro Player of the Year. However, for the next season, the Players Championship was renamed to World Championship and Pro Player of the Year was made a separate title once again. Originally the team portion of Worlds was planned to be discontinued, but after public outcry from the players Wizards decided to create a replacement, the World Magic Cup.

== Mode ==
For 2015, it was initially announced that the World Championship and the World Magic Cup would be held on separate weeks, sharing the same venue. However, it was later announced that these events would be held at different locations and at different times.

== Participants ==
=== World Championship ===
Prior to 2012, the following players were eligible to play in the World Championship:

- Current World Champion
- 2nd to 8th-place finishers from the previous World Championship.
- Current Pro Player of the Year.
- For countries that hold an invitation-only National Championship, the three members of each national team and that team's designated alternate.
- For countries that hold an open National Championship, the winner of that National Championship.
- Players with Pro Tour Players Club level 4 or higher. (This includes all members of the Hall of Fame.)
- Players with Pro Tour Players Club level 3 that have not yet used their Players Club invitation
- Top 25 DCI Total-ranked players from the APAC region.
- Top 25 DCI Total-ranked players from Japan.
- Top 50 DCI Total-ranked players from the Europe region.
- Top 50 DCI Total-ranked players from the Latin America region.
- Top 50 DCI Total-ranked players from the North America region.
- Players invited to the Magic Online Championship held the same week (New in 2009).

(Compare Magic Premier Event Invitation Policy).

On 2 November 2011, Wizards of the Coast announced a major change to the structure of the World Championship. It was announced that as of 2012, the individual World Championship would be renamed the Magic Players Championship, though the tournament would later revert to its original title, and move from being a Pro Tour-sized event to an exclusive sixteen-person tournament. These sixteen players will be the:

- Previous World Champion/Magic Players Champion
- Previous Magic Online Champion Series Champion
- Winners of the previous three Pro Tours
- The top-ranked player from each geo-region (Asia Pacific, Europe, Japan, Latin America, and North America) in the Planeswalker Points Yearly Professional Total in previous' season who are not yet invited based on the above criteria
- The top-ranked players in previous' season worldwide Planeswalker Points Yearly Professional Total who are not yet invited based on the above criteria sufficient to bring the total number of invited players to the World Championship to sixteen. Should multiple players finished in the same position, the player with a better standing in his/her best Pro Tour in that season will have an advantage.

In 2012, it was also decided to invite the 2011 Pro Player of the Year, Owen Turtenwald, though it was intended that the title be retired in that year.

In 2014, the tournament was expanded to 24 players. Additional invites were granted to the players ranked 2nd place from each geo-region, the fourth Pro-Tour winner, the Rookie of the Year, and the top-ranked player from the World Magic Cup winning country in the previous season, will be also invited.

In a 2015 revision, the Rookie of the Year invitation was replaced by the top-ranked player in terms of Pro Points earned in Grand Prix events (to which the point cap does not apply). Further revisions include a change in geo-region invitations, which have been increased to Top 3 for Europe and Asia-Pacific (which now includes Japan) and Top 4 for North America, at the expense of at-large slots. Effective after the 2015 World Championship, the captain of the previous season's World Magic Cup winning team would also no longer receive an invite.

=== Team World Championship ===
The Team World Championship consists of three-player teams, with each team representing one country. Players that are eligible to play in the Team World Championship are the first, second and third place players at a country's National Championship.

=== World Magic Cup ===
In 2012, the Team World Championship became a single separate event called the 'World Magic Cup'. This national team event consists of four-player teams representing selected countries. The four players eligible to play in each national team will be the three winners of World Magic Cup qualifiers and the National Champion (the player finished with most Pro Points in previous season) of the country. The National Champion is the highest ranked player from that country in that year's rankings.

Until 2013, all players in top 4 will be invited into the following Pro Tour with airfare expense paid. It was expanded to top 8 teams since 2014. In 2013 and 2014 running, the National Champion of the winning team was also invited to the following year's World Championship.

== 1994 World championship ==
Zak Dolan – 1994 World Championship Angel Stasis
Main Deck		Sideboard
1 Ancestral Recall; 1 Armageddon; 1 Birds of Paradise; 1 Black Lotus; 1 Black Vise; 1 Clone; 1 Control Magic; 2 Disenchant; 1 Howling Mine; 1 Icy Manipulator; 1 Ivory Tower; 1 Kismet; 1 Ley Druid; 1 Library of Alexandria; 1 Mana Drain; 1 Mana Vault; 2 Meekstone; 1 Mox Emerald; 1 Mox Ruby; 1 Mox Pearl	1 Mox Sapphire; 1 Mox Jet; 2 Old Man of the Sea; 1 Recall; 1 Regrowth; 4 Savannah; 4 Serra Angel; 1 Siren's Call; 1 Sol Ring; 2 Strip Mine; 4 Swords to Plowshares; 2 Stasis; 1 Time Elemental; 1 Timetwister; 1 Time Walk; 4 Tropical Island; 4 Tundra; 1 Vesuvan Doppelganger; 1 Winter Orb; 1 Wrath of God	1 Chaos Orb; 1 Circle of Protection: Red; 1 Copy Artifact; 1 Diamond Valley; 1 In the Eye of Chaos; 1 Floral Spuzzem; 2 Karma; 1 Kismet; 1 Magical Hack; 1 Power Sink; 1 Presence of the Master; 1 Reverse Damage; 1 Sleight of Mind; 1 Winter Blast

The first Magic World Championship was held at the Gen Con in Milwaukee, USA on 19–21 August 1994. It is the only Worlds tournament which was held in the Vintage format, though it wasn't known as such at the time because there was only one sanctioned format. The 1994 Worlds is also the only Worlds which was not an invite-only tournament. Instead, everybody could register, but the tournament was capped at 512 participants. After two days of single elimination play the final four players featured Bertrand Lestrée, who defeated Cyrille DeFoucaud 2–0 in his semi-final, and Zak Dolan, who defeated Dominic Symens 2–0 in the other semi-final. In the final Dolan defeated Lestrée 2–1.

Final standings

1. (United States) Zak Dolan
2. (France) Bertrand Lestrée
3. (Belgium) Dominic Symens
4. (France) Cyrille de Foucaud

== 1995 World championship ==
Alexander Blumke – 1995 World Championship Rack Control
Main Deck		Sideboard
3 Adarkar Wastes; 1 Balance; 1 Bottomless Vault; 3 Dance of the Dead; 1 Dark Banishing; 4 Dark Ritual; 3 Disenchant; 1 Disrupting Scepter; 4 Hymn to Tourach; 3 Hypnotic Specter; 2 Icy Manipulator; 1 Land Tax; 1 Mind Twist; 4 Mishra's Factory	3 Plains; 1 Pestilence; 1 Power Sink; 3 The Rack; 1 Royal Assassin; 2 Sengir Vampire; 1 Spirit Link; 1 Strip Mine; 12 Swamp; 1 Swords to Plowshares; 2 Terror; 1 Underground River; 2 Zuran Orb	1 Blue Elemental Blast; 1 Circle of Protection: Black; 2 Circle of Protection: Red; 1 Copy Artifact; 4 Gloom; 1 Land Tax; 1 Magical Hack; 1 Prismatic Ward; 1 Sleight of Mind; 2 Stromgald Cabal

The second Magic World Championship was held on 4–6 August at the Red Lion Inn in Seattle, USA. 71 players from 19 countries participated. The tournament featured five rounds of Sealed Deck on the first day and five rounds of Standard, then known as Type II, on the second day. In each round three games were played and three points were awarded for each individual game won instead of completed matches as today. After 30 games five players were tied at 19 wins. Blumke and Redi advanced to the top eight after a playoff. The top 8 on Sunday were played with the Standard decks from the day before. In the final Alexander Blumke defeated Marc Hernandez 3–2.

Final standings

1. (Switzerland) Alexander Blumke
2. (France) Marc Hernandez
3. (United States) Mark Justice
3. (United States) Henry Stern
5. (Italy) Ivan Curina
5. (Italy) Andrea Redi
5. (Finland) Henri Schildt
5. (Austria) Mu-Luen Wang

Team champion

1. United States – Mark Justice, Henry Stern, Peter Leiher, Michael Long
2. Finland – Rosendahl, Henri Schildt, Kimmo Hovi, Punakallio
3. Australia – Glenn Shanley, Christopher Hudson, Russell, Liew
4. France – Marc Hernandez, Moulin, Woirgard, Lebas

== 1996 World championship ==
Tom Chanpheng – 1996 World Championship White Weenie
Main Deck		Sideboard
1 Armageddon; 1 Balance; 4 Disenchant; 1 Kjeldoran Outpost; 1 Land Tax; 1 Lodestone Bauble; 4 Mishra's Factory; 4 Order of Leitbur; 4 Order of the White Shield; 2 Phyrexian War Beast	15 Plains; 1 Reinforcements; 1 Reprisal; 4 Savannah Lions; 2 Serra Angel; 1 Sleight of Mind; 4 Strip Mine; 4 Swords to Plowshares; 4 White Knight; 1 Zuran Orb	2 Arenson's Aura; 1 Black Vise; 4 Divine Offering; 1 Energy Storm; 1 Exile; 1 Kjeldoran Outpost; 1 Reprisal; 2 Serrated Arrows; 1 Sleight of Mind; 1 Spirit Link

The third Magic World Championship was held at the Wizards headquarters in Seattle, USA. It was the first Worlds also to be a Pro Tour. 125 players competed in the event. The tournament featured six rounds each of Booster Draft, Standard (Type II), and Legacy (Type 1.5). For each match two points were awarded to the winner. In case of a draw both players received one point. For the first time the World Championship also included an official team portion.

Final standings

1. (Australia) Tom Chanpheng
2. (United States) Mark Justice
3. (United States) Henry Stern
3. (Sweden) Olle Råde
5. (United States) Matt Place
5. (United States) Scott Johns
5. (Canada) Eric Tam
5. (Finland) Tommi Hovi

Note that Chanpheng's winning deck included a Sleight of Mind, but no sources of blue mana. This stemmed from an error in his submitted decklist, which was supposed to include some number of Adarkar Wastes in place of Plains.

Tom's victory was commemorated with a unique card, named 1996 World Champion.

Team final

1. United States – Dennis Bentley, George Baxter, Mike Long, Matt Place
2. Czech Republic – David Korejtko, Jakub Slemr, Ondrej Baudys, Lukas Kocourek

Pro Tour Player of the Year

1. (Sweden) Olle Råde
2. (United States) Shawn "Hammer" Regnier
3. (United States) Mark Justice

== 1997 World championship ==
Jakub Slemr – 1997 World Championship Four Color Black
Main Deck		Sideboard
4 Black Knight; 4 Choking Sands; 3 City of Brass; 4 Contagion; 2 Earthquake; 4 Fallen Askari; 3 Gemstone Mine; 4 Incinerate; 4 Knight of Stromgald	4 Man-o'-War; 1 Necratog; 4 Nekrataal; 2 Shadow Guildmage; 2 Sulfurous Springs; 10 Swamp; 2 Uktabi Orangutan; 1 Underground River; 3 Undiscovered Paradise	2 Disenchant; 2 Dystopia; 2 Ebony Charm; 1 Exile; 2 Forsaken Wastes; 1 Honorable Passage; 2 Hydroblast; 3 Pyroblast

The fourth Magic World Championship was held on 13–17 August 1997 in Seattle, USA. 153 players competed in the event. It was the first Magic tournament to be filmed by ESPN2 and was covered in Sports Illustrated. The competition featured Standard, Mirage-Visions-Weatherlight Rochester Draft, and Extended, and Fifth Edition-Weatherlight Team Sealed for the team portion.

Final standings

1. (Czech Republic) Jakub Slemr
2. (Germany) Janosch Kühn
3. (Canada) Paul McCabe
3. (Denmark) Svend Geertsen
5. (Canada) Gabriel Tsang
5. (Sweden) Nikolai Weibull
5. (United States) Nate Clark
5. (United States) John Chinnock

Team final

1. Canada – Gary Krakower, Michael Donais, Ed Ito, Gabriel Tsang
2. Sweden – Nikolai Weibull, Mattias Jorstedt, Marcus Angelin, Johan Cedercrantz

Pro Tour Player of the Year

1. (Canada) Paul McCabe
2. (Canada) Terry Borer

== 1998 World championship ==
Brian Selden – 1998 World Championship RecSur
Main Deck		Sideboard
4 Birds of Paradise; 3 City of Brass; 1 Cloudchaser Eagle; 2 Lobotomy; 2 Firestorm; 8 Forest; 1 Gemstone Mine; 2 Karplusan Forest; 1 Man-o'-War; 2 Nekrataal; 1 Orcish Settlers; 4 Recurring Nightmare; 2 Reflecting Pool; 2 Scroll Rack	2 Spike Feeder; 1 Spike Weaver; 1 Spirit of the Night; 4 Survival of the Fittest; 1 Swamp; 1 Thrull Surgeon; 1 Tradewind Rider; 2 Uktabi Orangutan; 2 Underground River; 2 Undiscovered Paradise; 1 Verdant Force; 1 Volrath's Stronghold; 4 Wall of Blossoms; 2 Wall of Roots	4 Boil; 2 Dread of Night; 3 Emerald Charm; 1 Hall of Gemstone; 2 Phyrexian Furnace; 2 Pyroblast; 1 Staunch Defenders

The fifth Magic World Championship was held on 12–16 August 1998 in Seattle, USA. This tournament featured a Tempest-Stronghold-Exodus Booster Draft, Standard, and Tempest Block Constructed.

203 players competed in the event. The USA dominated the top 8, taking seven of the eight slots. The USA also won the team competition.

Finishing order

1. (United States) Brian Selden
2. (United States) Ben Rubin
3. (United States) Jon Finkel
4. (France) Raphaël Lévy
5. (United States) Scott Johns
6. (United States) Chris Pikula
7. (United States) Brian Hacker
8. (United States) Alan Comer

Team final

1. United States – Matt Linde, Mike Long, Bryce Currence, Jon Finkel
2. France – Pierre Malherbaud, Manuel Bevand, Marc Hernandez, Fabien Demazeau

Pro Tour Player of the Year

1. (United States) Jon Finkel
2. (United States) Randy Buehler
3. (United States) Steven O'Mahoney-Schwartz

Rookie of the Year

1. (United States) Randy Buehler

== 1999 World championship ==
Kai Budde – 1999 World Championship Wildfire
Main Deck		Sideboard
3 Ancient Tomb; 4 City of Traitors; 4 Covetous Dragon; 4 Cursed Scroll; 4 Fire Diamond; 4 Grim Monolith; 1 Karn, Silver Golem; 3 Masticore	2 Mishra's Helix; 13 Mountain; 4 Temporal Aperture; 4 Thran Dynamo; 4 Voltaic Key; 4 Wildfire; 2 Worn Powerstone	2 Boil; 3 Earthquake; 1 Mishra's Helix; 1 Phyrexian Processor; 2 Rack and Ruin; 2 Shattering Pulse; 4 Spellshock

The sixth Magic World Championship was held on 4–8 August 1999 at the Yokohama Pacifico in Yokohama, Japan. This tournament featured an Urza's Saga-Urza's Legacy-Urza's Destiny Rochester Draft, Standard, and Extended.

208 players from 32 countries competed in the event. In the final Kai Budde defeated Mark Le Pine 3–0 in about 20 minutes, the quickest Pro Tour final ever. Budde's win was the first of his seven Pro Tour victories. By winning this title he also claimed the first of his four Pro Player of the Year titles.

Finishing order

1. (Germany) Kai Budde
2. (United States) Mark Le Pine
3. (Italy) Raffaele Lo Moro
4. (United States) Matt Linde
5. (Czech Republic) Jakub Slemr
6. (United States) Jamie Parke
7. (Canada) Gary Wise
8. (Norway) Nicolai Herzog

Team final

1. United States – Kyle Rose, John Hunka, Zvi Mowshowitz, Charles Kornblith
2. Germany – Marco Blume, Patrick Mello, David Brucker, Rosario Maij

Pro Tour Player of the Year

1. (Germany) Kai Budde
2. (United States) Jon Finkel
3. (United States) Casey McCarrel

Rookie of the Year

1. (Germany) Dirk Baberowski

== 2000 World championship ==
Jon Finkel – 2000 World Championship Tinker
Main Deck		Sideboard
4 Brainstorm; 1 Crumbling Sanctuary; 4 Crystal Vein; 4 Grim Monolith; 9 Island; 4 Masticore; 4 Metalworker; 1 Mishra's Helix	1 Phyrexian Colossus; 4 Phyrexian Processor; 4 Rishadan Port; 4 Saprazzan Skerry; 4 Tangle Wire; 4 Thran Dynamo; 4 Tinker; 4 Voltaic Key	4 Annul; 4 Chill; 4 Miscalculation; 1 Mishra's Helix; 2 Rising Waters

The seventh Magic World Championship was held in Brussels, Belgium on 2–6 August 2000. It was the first time the Worlds were held in Europe. The tournament featured a Mercadian Masques-Nemesis-Prophecy Booster Draft, Mercadian Masques Block Constructed, and Standard.

273 players from 46 countries competed in the event. In the final Jon Finkel defeated his friend, Bob Maher. Both played nearly identical decks with a difference of just one card.

Finishing order

1. (United States) Jon Finkel
2. (United States) Bob Maher, Jr.
3. (Germany) Dominik Hothow
4. (Austria) Benedikt Klauser
5. (Netherlands) Tom van de Logt
6. (Austria) Helmut Summersberger
7. (Germany) Janosch Kühn
8. (France) Nicolas Labarre

Team final

1. United States – Jon Finkel, Chris Benafel, Frank Hernandez, Aaron Forsythe
2. Canada – Ryan Fuller, Murray Evans, Gabriel Tsang, Sam Lau

Pro Tour Player of the Year

1. (United States) Bob Maher, Jr.
2. (United States) Darwin Kastle
3. (United States) Jon Finkel

Rookie of the Year

1. (United States) Brian Davis

== 2001 World championship ==
Tom van de Logt – 2001 World Championship Machine Head
Main Deck		Sideboard
4 Blazing Specter; 2 Crypt Angel; 4 Dark Ritual; 4 Duress; 2 Flametongue Kavu; 6 Mountain; 4 Plague Spitter; 3 Phyrexian Scuta	4 Rishadan Port; 3 Skizzik; 4 Sulfurous Springs; 6 Swamp; 4 Terminate; 4 Urborg Volcano; 3 Urza's Rage; 3 Vendetta	3 Addle; 1 Crypt Angel; 1 Flametongue Kavu; 2 Persecute; 3 Phyrexian Arena; 1 Pyroclasm; 4 Scoria Cat

The eighth Magic World Championship was held on 8–12 August 2001 at the Metro Toronto Convention Centre in Toronto, Ontario, Canada. The tournament featured Invasion-Planeshift-Apocalypse Rochester Draft, Standard, and Extended as individual formats and Invasion block team Rochester as the team format.

296 players from 51 countries competed in the tournament. Tom van de Logt from the Netherlands came out as the new world champion, garnering a prize of $35,000 for his victory (as well as another $1,000 for the success of the Dutch team he was part of). Other finalists included future World Series of Poker bracelet winner Alex Borteh (2nd place), Antoine Ruel (3rd place), Andrea Santin (4th place), Mike Turian (5th place), Jan Tomcani (6th place), Tommi Hovi (7th place), and David Williams (disqualified). John Ormerod did not make the top 8 finishers, but was awarded 8th place after David Williams was disqualified for a marked deck. The team competition was won by the US team, which defeated Norway in the team final.

Finishing Order

1. (Netherlands) Tom van de Logt
2. (United States) Alex Borteh
3. (France) Antoine Ruel
4. (Italy) Andrea Santin
5. (United States) Mike Turian
6. (Slovakia) Jan Tomcani
7. (Finland) Tommi Hovi
8. (England) John Ormerod

Team final

1. United States – Trevor Blackwell, Brian Hegstad, Eugene Harvey
2. Norway – Nicolai Herzog, Oyvind Odegaard, Jan Pieter Groenhof

Pro Tour Player of the Year

1. (Germany) Kai Budde
2. (Netherlands) Kamiel Cornelissen
3. (United States) Michael Pustilnik

Rookie of the Year

1. (Japan) Katsuhiro Mori

== 2002 World championship ==
Carlos Romão – 2002 World Championship Psychatog
Main Deck		Sideboard
2 Cephalid Coliseum; 3 Chainer's Edict; 3 Circular Logic; 4 Counterspell; 3 Cunning Wish; 1 Darkwater Catacombs; 3 Deep Analysis; 3 Fact or Fiction; 10 Island	3 Memory Lapse; 4 Nightscape Familiar; 2 Upheaval; 4 Psychatog; 4 Repulse; 4 Salt Marsh; 3 Swamp; 4 Underground River	1 Coffin Purge; 4 Duress; 1 Fact or Fiction; 1 Gainsay; 3 Ghastly Demise; 1 Hibernation; 1 Mana Short; 1 Recoil; 1 Slay; 1 Teferi's Response

The ninth Magic World Championship was held on 14–18 August 2002 at Fox Studios in Sydney, Australia. The tournament featured Odyssey-Torment-Judgment Booster Draft, Odyssey Block Constructed, and Standard as individual formats and Odyssey Team Rochester Draft as the team format.

245 players from 46 countries competed in the tournament. Twenty-four-year-old Carlos "Jaba" Romão from São Paulo, Brazil came out as world champion, defeating Mark Ziegner 3–2 in the final, thereby garnering a prize of $35,000 with the help of his blue/black "Psychatog" deck. Germany won the team competition, defeating the United States in the final 2–1.

Finishing order

1. (Brazil) Carlos Romão
2. (Germany) Mark Ziegner
3. (Argentina) Diego Ostrovich
4. (United States) Dave Humpherys
5. (Malaysia) Sim Han How
6. (Republic of Ireland) John Larkin
7. (Finland) Tuomas Kotiranta
8. (United States) Ken Krouner

Team final

1. Germany – Kai Budde, Mark Ziegner, Felix Schneiders
2. United States – Eugene Harvey, Andrew Ranks, Eric Franz

Pro Tour Player of the Year

1. (Germany) Kai Budde
2. (Sweden) Jens Thorén
3. (United States) Alex Shvartsman

Rookie of the Year

1. (France) Farid Meraghni

== 2003 World championship ==
Daniel Zink – 2003 World Championship Wake
Main Deck:		Sideboard:
4 Mana Leak; 1 Circular Logic; 4 Wrath of God; 2 Vengeful Dreams; 3 Moment's Peace; 3 Renewed Faith; 3 Mirari's Wake; 1 Mirari; 4 Deep Analysis; 3 Compulsion; 3 Cunning Wish; 2 Decree of Justice	4 Krosan Verge; 4 Skycloud Expanse; 4 Forest; 4 Plains; 7 Island; 2 Flooded Strand; 2 Elfhame Palace	1 Vengeful Dreams; 1 Hunting Pack; 1 Wing Shards; 1 Circular Logic; 1 Ray of Distortion; 1 Renewed Faith; 1 Krosan Reclamation; 2 Exalted Angel; 3 Ray of Revelation; 3 Anurid Brushhopper

(Complete coverage)

The tenth Magic World Championship was held from 6 to 10 August at the Estrel Hotel in Berlin, Germany. The tournament featured Onslaught-Legions-Scourge Rochester Draft, Extended, and Standard as individual formats and Onslaught Team Rochester Draft as the team format.

312 players from 54 countries participated in the tournament. German Daniel Zink managed to emerge as the new world champion, beating Japan's Jin Okamoto 3–0 in the finals and taking home $35,000 in the process. The total prize money awarded to the top 64 finishers was $208,130. In the team final the United States defeated Finland 2–1.

Finishing order

1. (Germany) Daniel Zink
2. (Japan) Jin Okamoto
3. (Finland) Tuomo Nieminen
4. (United States) Dave Humpherys
5. (Netherlands) Jeroen Remie
6. (Germany) Peer Kröger
7. (Germany) Wolfgang Eder
8. (United States) Gabe Walls

Team Finals

1. United States – Justin Gary, Gabe Walls, Joshua Wagner
2. Finland – Tomi Walamies, Tuomo Nieminen, Arho Toikka

Player of the Year Race

1. (Germany) Kai Budde
2. (United States) Justin Gary
2. (Sweden) Mattias Jorstedt

Rookie of the Year
(Japan) Masashi Oiso

== 2004 World championship ==
Julien Nuijten – 2004 World Championship W/G Astral Slide
Main Deck:		Sideboard:
4 Viridian Shaman; 4 Eternal Witness; 4 Eternal Dragon 4 Wrath of God; 4 Renewed Faith; 4 Astral Slide; 2 Akroma's Vengeance; 2 Decree of Justice; 1 Plow Under; 2 Wing Shards; 4 Rampant Growth	4 Secluded Steppe; 4 Tranquil Thicket; 4 Windswept Heath; 6 Plains; 7 Forest	4 Oxidize; 2 Rude Awakening; 3 Scrabbling Claws; 3 Circle of Protection: Red; 3 Plow Under

(Complete coverage)

The eleventh Magic World Championship was held from 1 to 5 September at the Fort Mason Center in San Francisco, California, USA. The tournament featured Standard on Wednesday, Mirrodin-Darksteel-Fifth Dawn Booster Draft on Thursday, and Mirrodin Block Constructed on Friday. The team format was Mirrodin Block Team Rochester Draft.

304 players from 51 countries competed in the event. This was the first ever World Championships without a player from the United States in the Top 8. Julien Nuijten won the final 3–1 against Aeo Paquette. At 15 years old, he became the youngest ever Pro Tour winner and took home a total of $52,366 – a new record for winnings in a single collectible card game tournament. The total prize money awarded to the top 64 finishers was $208,130. Team Germany won the team final 2–1 against Belgium.

Finishing order

1. (Netherlands) Julien Nuijten
2. (Canada) Aeo Paquette
3. (Japan) Ryou Ogura
4. (France) Manuel Bevand
5. (Netherlands) Kamiel Cornelissen
6. (Malaysia) Terry Soh
7. (France) Gabriel Nassif
8. (Canada) Murray Evans

Team final

1. Germany – Torben Twiefel, Roland Bode, Sebastian Zink
2. Belgium – Vincent Lemoine, Dilson Ramos Da Fonseca, Geoffrey Siron

Player of the Year Race

1. (France) Gabriel Nassif
2. (Norway) Nicolai Herzog
3. (Norway) Rickard Österberg

Rookie of the Year
(Netherlands) Julien Nuijten

== 2005 World championship ==
(Complete coverage)

Katsuhiro Mori – 2005 World Championship Ghazi Glare
Main Deck:		Sideboard:
2 Yosei, The Morning Star; 3 Arashi the Sky Asunder; 1 Birds of Paradise; 4 Selesnya Guildmage; 4 Wood Elves; 4 Loxodon Hierarch; 3 Kodama of the North Tree; 3 Llanowar Elves 3 Pithing Needle; 3 Umezawa's Jitte; 2 Congregation at Dawn; 3 Glare of Subdual; 2 Seed Spark	4 Vitu-Ghazi, The City Tree; 4 Selesnya Sanctuary; 1 Okina, Temple to the Grandfathers; 4 Brushland; 5 Forest; 4 Temple Garden; 1 Plains	2 Greater Good; 1 Kodama of the North Tree; 2 Naturalize; 2 Carven Caryatid; 1 Seedborn Muse; 1 Wrath of God; 1 Kodama's Reach; 2 Yosei, the Morning Star; 3 Hokori, Dust Drinker

The twelfth Magic World Championship was held from 30 November to 4 December at the Pacifico Yokohama in Yokohama, Japan. The tournament featured Standard on Wednesday, Ravnica Booster Draft on Thursday, and Extended on Friday. The team format was Ravnica Team Rochester Draft. The event began with the induction of the first class of the newly incepted Hall of Fame – Alan Comer, Jon Finkel, Tommi Hovi, Darwin Kastle, and Olle Råde.

287 players from 56 countries competed in the event. Katsuhiro Mori won the tournament, defeating Frank Karsten 3–1 in the final, taking home $35,000. The total prize money awarded to the top 64 finishers was $208,130. In the team final Japan defeated the United States 3–0.

Finishing Order

1. (Japan) Katsuhiro Mori
2. (Netherlands) Frank Karsten
3. (Japan) Tomohiro Kaji
4. (Japan) Akira Asahara
5. (Portugal) Márcio Carvalho
6. (Singapore) Ding Leong
7. (Japan) Shuhei Nakamura
8. (Portugal) André Coimbra

Team final

1. Japan – Takuma Morofuji, Ichirou Shimura, Masashi Oiso
2. United States – Antonino De Rosa, Neil Reeves, Jonathan Sonne

Player of the Year Race

1. (Japan) Kenji Tsumura
2. (France) Olivier Ruel
3. (Japan) Masashi Oiso

Rookie of the Year

1. (France) Pierre Canali

Hall of Fame inductees

- (United States) Jon Finkel
- (United States) Darwin Kastle
- (Finland) Tommi Hovi
- (United States) Alan Comer
- (Sweden) Olle Råde

== 2006 World championship ==
(Complete Coverage)

Makihito Mihara – 2006 World Championship Dragonstorm
Main Deck:		Sideboard:
4 Bogardan Hellkite; 2 Hunted Dragon 4 Dragonstorm; 4 Lotus Bloom; 4 Telling Time; 4 Seething Song; 4 Sleight of Hand; 4 Rite of Flame; 4 Gigadrowse; 4 Remand	1 Dreadship Reef; 1 Calciform Pools; 8 Island; 4 Steam Vents; 4 Mountain; 4 Shivan Reef	1 Trickbind; 3 Pyroclasm; 1 Calciform Pools; 2 Dreadship Reef; 3 Ignorant Bliss; 4 Repeal; 1 Teferi, Mage of Zhalfir

The thirteenth Magic World Championship took place from 29 November – 3 December 2006 at the Carrousel du Louvre in Paris, France. The tournament featured Standard on Wednesday, Time Spiral Booster Draft on Thursday, and Extended on Friday. The team format was Time Spiral Team Rochester Draft. Also on Wednesday Bob Maher, Dave Humpherys, Raphaël Lévy, Gary Wise, and Rob Dougherty were inducted into the Hall of Fame.

The winner of this tournament was Makihito Mihara, who defeated Ryou Ogura 3–0 in an all-Japanese final. He piloted a combo deck based on the card Dragonstorm. It is the first time players from the same country have been World Champion in back-to-back seasons. The Netherlands defeated Japan 2–0 in the team final. The total prize money awarded to the top 75 finishers was $255,245.

Finishing Order

1. (Japan) Makihito Mihara
2. (Japan) Ryou Ogura
3. (Wales) Nicholas Lovett
4. (France) Gabriel Nassif
5. (Portugal) Paulo Carvalho
6. (Brazil) Paulo Vitor Damo da Rosa
7. (Portugal) Tiago Chan
8. (Japan) Katsuhiro Mori

Team final

1. Netherlands – Kamiel Cornelissen, Julien Nuijten, Robert Van Medevoort
2. Japan – Katsuhiro Mori, Shuhei Yamamoto, Hidenori Katayama

Player of the Year

1. (Japan) Shouta Yasooka
2. (Japan) Shuhei Nakamura
3. (Brazil) Paulo Vitor Damo da Rosa

Rookie of the Year

1. (Germany) Sebastian Thaler

Hall of Fame inductees

- (United States) Bob Maher, Jr.
- (United States) Dave Humpherys
- (France) Raphaël Lévy
- (Canada) Gary Wise
- (United States) Rob Dougherty

== 2007 World championship ==
(Complete Coverage)

Uri Peleg – 2007 World Championship Doran Rock
Main Deck:		Sideboard:
4 Birds of Paradise; 4 Doran, the Siege Tower; 1 Hypnotic Specter; 3 Llanowar Elves; 4 Ohran Viper; 3 Shriekmaw; 4 Tarmogoyf 2 Eyeblight's Ending; 3 Garruk Wildspeaker; 1 Liliana Vess; 2 Nameless Inversion; 2 Profane Command; 4 Thoughtseize	1 Brushland; 3 Caves of Koilos; 1 Forest; 2 Gemstone Mine; 4 Gilt-Leaf Palace; 1 Horizon Canopy; 4 Llanowar Wastes; 1 Pendelhaven; 4 Treetop Village; 2 Urborg, Tomb of Yawgmoth	2 Cloudthresher; 2 Loxodon Warhammer; 2 Nath of the Gilt-Leaf; 1 Oblivion Ring; 3 Riftsweeper; 2 Serrated Arrows; 1 Shriekmaw; 2 Stupor

The fourteenth Magic World Championship took place from 6–9 December 2007 at the Jacob K. Javits Center of New York in New York City, USA. The tournament featured five rounds of Standard and a Lorwyn Booster Draft on Thursday. Friday featured five rounds of Legacy and another Lorwyn Booster Draft. The team format was Lorwyn Two-Headed Giant Booster Draft. The top 64 individual finishers received $215,600 in prize money.

386 players from 61 countries competed in the event. The winner of the tournament was Uri Peleg (who is now a high stakes poker player), defeating Patrick Chapin 3–1 in the final. Katsuhiro Mori made the top 8 for the third consecutive year, while Gabriel Nassif made his third final eight within four Worlds. Coincidentally, each player mirrored their performance from the previous year (Mori was eliminated in the quarter-finals, Nassif in the semi-finals).

Finishing Order

1. (Israel) Uri Peleg
2. (United States) Patrick Chapin
3. (France) Gabriel Nassif
4. (Japan) Koutarou Ootsuka
5. (Switzerland) Christoph Huber
6. (Japan) Yoshitaka Nakano
7. (Japan) Katsuhiro Mori
8. (Netherlands) Roel van Heeswijk

Team final

1. Switzerland – Nico Bohny, Manuel Bucher, Christoph Huber, Raphael Gennari
2. Austria – Thomas Preyer, David Reitbauer, Stefan Stradner, Helmut Summersberger

Pro Tour Player of the Year

1. (Japan) Tomoharu Saitou
2. (Japan) Kenji Tsumura
3. (France) Guillaume Wafo-Tapa

Rookie of the Year

1. (Japan) Yuuya Watanabe

Hall of Fame inductees

- (Germany) Kai Budde
- (United States) Zvi Mowshowitz
- (Japan) Tsuyoshi Fujita
- (Norway) Nicolai Herzog
- (United States) Randy Buehler

== 2008 World championship ==
Antti Malin – 2008 World Championship Faeries
Main Deck:		Sideboard:
4 Mistbind Clique; 2 Sower of Temptation; 4 Spellstutter Sprite; 2 Vendilion Clique 4 Agony Warp; 4 Bitterblossom; 3 Broken Ambitions; 4 Cryptic Command; 3 Remove Soul; 1 Terror; 4 Thoughtseize	1 Faerie Conclave; 6 Island; 4 Mutavault; 4 Secluded Glen; 4 Sunken Ruins; 2 Swamp; 4 Underground River	4 Flashfreeze; 2 Glen Elendra Archmage; 4 Infest; 2 Jace Beleren; 1 Mind Shatter; 1 Ponder; 1 Sower of Temptation

(Official coverage)

The fifteenth Magic World Championship took place from 11 to 14 December 2008 at the Memphis Cook Convention Center in Memphis, TN, USA. The tournament featured six rounds of Standard play on Thursday, two Shards of Alara Booster Drafts with three rounds of Swiss each on Friday, six rounds of Extended on Saturday, and the finals on Sunday. Also, the national teams played two rounds of team constructed each on Thursday and Saturday with the Top 4 teams advancing to the single elimination finals on Sunday. The team format was 3 Person Team Constructed with one player playing Standard, one Extended, and one Legacy. The top 75 individual finishers received $245,245 in prize money.

329 players from 57 countries competed in the event. Antti Malin from Finland won the tournament, thereby claiming the first prize of $45,000. In the team final the United States defeated Australia to become the team champion.

Individual

1. (Finland) Antti Malin
2. (United States) Jamie Parke
3. (Japan) Tsuyoshi Ikeda
4. (Estonia) Hannes Kerem
5. (Brazil) Paulo Vitor Damo da Rosa
6. (Japan) Kenji Tsumura
7. (Netherlands) Frank Karsten
8. (Japan) Akira Asahara

Team Competition

1. United States – Michael Jacob, Samuel Black, Paul Cheon
2. Australia – Aaron Nicastri, Brandon Lau, Justin Cheung
3. Brazil – Willy Edel, Vagner Casatti, Luiz Guilherme de Michielli
4. Japan – Yuuya Watanabe, Masashi Oiso, Akihiro Takakuwa

Pro Player of the Year

1. (Japan) Shuhei Nakamura
2. (France) Olivier Ruel
2. (United States) Luis Scott-Vargas

Rookie of the Year

1. (Australia) Aaron Nicastri

Hall of Fame inductees

- (Germany) Dirk Baberowski
- (United States) Mike Turian
- (Netherlands) Jelger Wiegersma
- (France) Olivier Ruel
- (United States) Ben Rubin

== 2009 World championship ==
André Coimbra – 2009 World Championship Naya Lightsaber
Main Deck:		Sideboard:
4 Baneslayer Angel; 4 Bloodbraid Elf; 4 Noble Hierarch; 4 Ranger of Eos; 1 Scute Mob; 4 Wild Nacatl; 4 Woolly Thoctar 3 Ajani Vengeant; 4 Lightning Bolt; 4 Path to Exile	4 Arid Mesa; 4 Forest; 3 Mountain; 1 Oran-Rief, the Vastwood; 4 Plains; 4 Rootbound Crag; 4 Sunpetal Grove	1 Ajani Vengeant; 2 Burst Lightning; 4 Celestial Purge; 4 Goblin Ruinblaster; 4 Great Sable Stag

(Official coverage)

The sixteenth Magic World Championship took place from 19 to 22 November 2009 at the Palazzo Dei Congressi in Rome, Italy. The tournament featured six rounds of Standard play on Thursday, two Zendikar Booster Drafts with three rounds of Swiss each on Friday, six rounds of Extended on Saturday and the finals on Sunday. Also, the national teams played two rounds of team constructed each on Thursday and Saturday with the Top 4 teams advancing to the single elimination finals on Sunday. The team format was 3 Person Team Constructed with one player playing Standard, one Extended, and one Legacy.

409 players from 65 countries competed in the event. André Coimbra from Portugal won the tournament, thereby claiming the first prize of $45,000. In the team final, China defeated Austria to become the team champion. This was the first Magic Pro Tour event of any sort in which no player in the Top 8 was from the United States or Japan. It was also the first time a Pro Tour Top 8 consisted of players from eight countries.

The Magic Online World Championship was held for the first time. It also took place in Rome at the site of the paper Magic World Championship. The tournament was previously announced to be for eight competitors. The qualifications could be gained in special tournaments on Magic Online. The players played three rounds each of Classic, Zendikar Booster Draft, and Standard on computers provided on the site. After nine rounds the two best players determined the title in a final match of Standard. Anssi Myllymäki (screen name: Anathik) of Finland defeated former Pro Player of the Year Shouta Yasooka (yaya3) in the final, thus claiming the grand prize of $13,000. The other contestants won between $4,000 and $9,000.

Individual

1. (Portugal) André Coimbra
2. (Austria) David Reitbauer
3. (Malaysia) Terry Soh
4. (Netherlands) Bram Snepvangers
5. (Italy) William Cavaglieri
6. (Switzerland) Manuel Bucher
7. (Belgium) Marijn Lybaert
8. (Germany) Florian Pils

Team Competition

1. China – Bo Li, Wu Tong, Zhiyang Zhang
2. Austria – Benedikt Klauser, Bernhard Lehner, Benjamin Rozhon
3. Czech Republic – Lukas Blohon, Lukas Jakolvsky, Jan Kotrla
4. Netherlands – Kevin Grove, Niels Noorlander, Tom van Lamoen

Pro Player of the Year

1. (Japan) Yuuya Watanabe
2. (Japan) Tomoharu Saito
3. (Czech Republic) Martin Juza

Rookie of the Year

1. (Germany) Lino Burgold

Hall of Fame inductees

- (France) Antoine Ruel
- (Netherlands) Kamiel Cornelissen
- (Netherlands) Frank Karsten

Magic Online World Champion

- (Finland) Anssi Myllymäki

== 2010 World championship ==
Guillaume Matignon – 2010 World Championship Blue-Black Control
Main Deck:		Sideboard:
3 Grave Titan; 2 Sea Gate Oracle 1 Cancel; 2 Consume the Meek; 2 Disfigure; 2 Doom Blade; 1 Duress; 3 Inquisition of Kozilek; 2 Jace Beleren; 4 Jace, the Mind Sculptor; 4 Mana Leak; 4 Preordain; 4 Spreading Seas	4 Creeping Tar Pit; 4 Darkslick Shores; 4 Drowned Catacomb; 5 Island; 1 Misty Rainforest; 3 Swamp; 4 Tectonic Edge; 1 Verdant Catacombs	1 Deprive; 2 Disfigure; 1 Doom Blade; 2 Duress; 2 Flashfreeze; 3 Memoricide; 3 Ratchet Bomb; 1 Sorin Markov

(Official coverage)

The seventeenth Magic World Championship took place from 9–12 December in Makuhari Messe in Chiba, Japan. The tournament consisted of six rounds of Standard on Thursday, two Scars of Mirrodin Booster Drafts of three rounds each on Friday, and six rounds of Extended on Saturday. On Sunday the best eight players gathered for the Top 8. They had to play the same decks, they used in the Standard portion of the tournament. Also, the national teams played two rounds of team constructed each on Thursday and Saturday with the Top 2 teams advancing to the single elimination finals on Sunday. The team format is 3 Person Team Constructed with one player playing Standard, one Extended, and one Legacy.

352 players from 60 countries competed in the event. The national teams competition had 57 countries represented.

The 2010 World Champion Guillaume Matignon earned enough pro points with his performance to equal Pro Player of the Year leader Brad Nelson's total. This led to a play-off for the Pro Player of the Year title at Pro Tour Paris 2011, which was ultimately won by Brad Nelson.

Individual

1. (France) Guillaume Matignon
2. (France) Guillaume Wafo-Tapa
3. (Brazil) Paulo Vitor Damo da Rosa
4. (Sweden) Love Janse
5. (United States) Eric Froehlich
6. (Czech Republic) Lukas Jaklovsky
7. (Austria) Christopher Wolf
8. (England) Jonathan Randle

Team Competition

1. Slovakia – Ivan Floch, Robert Jurkovic, Patrik Surab
2. Australia – Adam Witton, Ian Wood, Jeremy Neeman

Pro Player of the Year

1. (United States) Brad Nelson
1. (France) Guillaume Matignon
3. (Brazil) Paulo Vitor Damo da Rosa

Rookie of the Year

1. (Italy) Andrea Giarola

Hall of Fame inductees

- (France) Gabriel Nassif
- (United States) Brian Kibler
- (Netherlands) Bram Snepvangers

Magic Online World Champion

- (Brazil) Carlos Romão

== 2011 World championship ==
Jun'ya Iyanaga – 2011 World Championship Wolf Run Ramp
Main Deck:		Sideboard:
1 Birds of Paradise; 4 Inferno Titan; 4 Primeval Titan; 4 Solemn Simulacrum; 1 Thrun, the Last Troll 2 Devil's Play; 4 Galvanic Blast; 2 Green Sun's Zenith; 4 Rampant Growth; 1 Shock; 3 Slagstorm; 4 Sphere of the Suns	4 Copperline Gorge; 5 Forest; 4 Inkmoth Nexus; 3 Kessig Wolf Run; 6 Mountain; 4 Rootbound Crag	2 Ancient Grudge; 4 Autumn's Veil; 1 Beast Within; 1 Slagstorm; 2 Sword of Feast and Famine; 2 Thrun, the Last Troll; 2 Tree of Redemption; 1 Viridian Corrupter

(Official coverage)

The eighteenth Magic World Championship was held from 17 to 20 November in the Fort Mason Center in San Francisco, the same site that already hosted the 2004 World Championship. The tournament consisted of six rounds of Standard on Thursday, two Innistrad Booster Drafts of three rounds each on Friday, and six rounds of Modern on Saturday. This would be the first World Championship to feature the new Modern format. On Sunday, the Top 8 players played against each other in elimination rounds, using the Standard decks they played on Thursday. 375 players from 60 countries competed in the event.

The Swiss rounds were dominated by American player Conley Woods, who would go 16–2 with his only losses being tactical concessions to other ChannelFireball teammates. Ultimately, four ChannelFireball teammates would make it into the Top 8: Conley Woods, Paulo Vitor Damo da Rosa, Luis Scott-Vargas and Josh Utter-Leyton. For Paulo this was his fourth World Championship Top 8, making him the first player to achieve this, and his eighth Pro Tour Top 8 overall. Also, for the first time players playing in the Magic Online World Championships managed to make the Top 8 of the Pro Tour, with Jun'ya Iyanaga (SEVERUS on MTGO) and David Caplan (goobafish on MTGO) making it to Sunday. The quarterfinals saw three of the four ChannelFireball teammates eliminated, with only Conley Woods making it to the semifinals after narrowly defeating Craig Wescoe 3–2. The semifinals were clean sweeps with Jun'ya Iyanaga and Richard Bland defeating Conley Woods and David Caplan 3–0 respectively. In the finals Jun'ya Iyanaga defeated Richard Bland in another 3–0 to become the 2011 World Champion. Jun'ya Iyanaga's prize money for winning the World Championship and placing seventh in the Magic Online World Championship was $51,000, making him the second highest earner in the history of the World Championships behind 2004 World Champion Julien Nuijten.

In the team event, Japan played against Norway for the World Team Title. The Japanese team of Ryuichiro Ishida, Tomoya Fujimoto, and former World Champion Makihito Mihara were victorious.

In the Magic Online World Championship finals, Reid Duke (reidderrabbit on MTGO) played against Florian Pils (flying man on MTGO) in the Modern format. Reid Duke won the match 2–1 to become the Magic Online World Champion, the first American and the first Magic Online Player of the Year to win the title.

Individual

1. (Japan) Jun'ya Iyanaga
2. (England) Richard Bland
3. (United States) Conley Woods
4. (Canada) David Caplan
5. (Brazil) Paulo Vitor Damo da Rosa
6. (United States) Luis Scott-Vargas
7. (United States) Josh Utter-Leyton
8. (United States) Craig Wescoe

Team Competition

1. Japan – Ryuichiro Ishida, Tomoya Fujimoto, Makihito Mihara
2. Norway – Sveinung Bjørnerud, Kristoffer Jonassen, Andreas Nordahl

Pro Player of the Year

1. (United States) Owen Turtenwald
2. (United States) Luis Scott-Vargas
3. (Czech Republic) Martin Juza

Rookie of the Year

1. (United States) Matthias Hunt

Hall of Fame inductees

- (Japan) Shuhei Nakamura
- (Sweden) Anton Jonsson
- (United States) Steven O'Mahoney-Schwartz

Magic Online World Champion

- (United States) Reid Duke

== 2012 World championship ==
In 2012, the Magic World Championship structure was drastically altered alongside changes to the ranking system used in Magic: The Gathering. The individual World Championship was changed from a Pro Tour-sized event to a sixteen-player event, which was called the Magic Players Championship (though the tournament reverted to being called the World Championship for 2013). The team event, formerly held alongside the individual event, took place before the individual tournament and was contested by four-player teams instead of the previous three-player teams.

=== 2012 World Magic Cup ===
(Official coverage)

==== Mode ====
The first World Magic Cup was held on 16–19 August at Gen Con 2012 in Indianapolis. The World Magic Cup is a modified national team event contested by four-player teams. Of the four players, three were winners of a country's three qualifier tournaments, called Magic World Cup qualifiers. The final player on the team was the National Champion, the player with the most pro points for the season from that country.

On Day 1, there were seven Swiss rounds including three rounds of Magic 2013 Booster Draft and four rounds of Standard. Players gained points for the team (Win- 3, Draw- 1, Loss- 0) and the best three scores in each team were added together to make a combined team score. The Top 32 teams with the highest combined team score advanced to Day 2.

On Day 2, all qualified teams will only start with three players, along with their advisor (the lowest scoring player in their team on Day 1). The 32 teams were being sorted, according to seeding, into eight pools of four teams. The teams played in three rounds with the format being Magic 2013 Team Sealed Deck. After these rounds, the top two teams from each pool advanced to the second stage, leaving sixteen teams. These teams were then sorted into four pools of four teams, and played three rounds of Team Constructed, with a player from each team playing Standard, Modern, and Innistrad Block Constructed.

On Day 3, the top eight teams from Day 2 competed in seeded single-elimination rounds, in the Team Constructed format, to determine the winner of the World Magic Cup.

==== Results ====
In the final of the tournament, the team from Taiwan played against the Puerto Rico team. Taiwan won the final and became the first World Magic Cup holders.

Finalists

1. Taiwan — Tzu-Ching Kuo, Tung-Yi Cheng, Yu Min Yang, and Paul Renie
2. Puerto Rico – Jorge Iramain, Gabriel Nieves, Cesar Soto, and Jonathan Paez
3. Poland – Tomek Pedrakowski, Mateusz Kopec, Adam Bubacz, and Jan Pruchniewicz
4. Hungary – Tamás Glied, Gabor Kocsis, Tamas Nagy, and Máté Schrick
5. Croatia – Grgur Petric Maretic, Toni Portolan, Stjepan Sucic, and Goran Elez
6. Scotland – Stephen Murray, Bradley Barclay, Andrew Morrison, and Chris Davie
7. Philippines – Andrew Cantillana, Gerald Camangon, Zax Ozaki, and Jeremy Bryan Domocmat
8. (Slovakia) Slovak Republic – Robert Jurkovic, Ivan Floch, Filip Valis, and Patrik Surab

=== 2012 Magic Players Championship ===
(Official coverage)

==== Mode ====
The 2012 Magic: The Gathering Players Championship was held from 29 to 31 August 2012 at the PAX Prime 2012 event. It replaced the former Pro Tour-sized World Championship event. Although originally entitled the 2012 World Championship, the tournament was renamed the Players Championship in an announcement in December 2011. The Players Championship also replaced the former Pro Player of the Year title, with that title intended to be encompassed in the Players Championship. The 2012 Magic Players Championship was an exclusive sixteen-person tournament which took place over three days. Day 1 consisted of three rounds of the Modern format followed by three rounds of Cube Draft, the first time a Cube Draft had been used in high-level competition. Day 2 consisted of three rounds of Magic 2013 draft, followed by three more rounds of Modern. On Day 3, the four players with the best records from the past 12 rounds played in single-elimination best-of-five-games Modern rounds to determine the winner of the Magic Players Championship.

==== Results ====
Yuuya Watanabe won the 2012 Players Championship and became only the second player ever (after Kai Budde) to receive more than one Player of the Year title.

1. Yuuya Watanabe (Top Pro Points, Japan) - Decklist
2. (Japan) Shouta Yasooka (Top Pro Points, At-large 3)
3. (Brazil) Paulo Vitor Damo da Rosa (Top Pro Points, Latin America)
4. (United States) Jon Finkel (Top Pro Points, At-large 1)
5. (Japan) Shuhei Nakamura (Top Pro Points, At-large 5)
6. (United States) Brian Kibler (Pro Tour Dark Ascension Champion)
7. (Italy) Samuele Estratti (Pro Tour Philadelphia Champion)
8. (Canada) Alexander Hayne (Pro Tour Avacyn Restored Champion)
9. (Czech Republic) Martin Juza (Top Pro Points, Europe)
10. (United States) Owen Turtenwald (2011 Pro Tour Player of the Year)
11. (Japan) Jun'ya Iyanaga (2011 World Champion)
12. (United States) Luis Scott-Vargas (Top Pro Points, At-large 2)
13. (United States) Josh Utter-Leyton (Top Pro Points, North America)
14. (United States) David Ochoa (Top Pro Points, At-large 4)
15. (Taiwan) Tzu-Ching Kuo (Top Pro Points, APAC)
16. (United States) Reid Duke (2011 Magic Online Champion)

== 2013 World Championship ==
(Official coverage)

For 2013 the Players Championship was renamed to World Championship. The title of Pro Player of the Year once again became a separate title, being awarded to Josh Utter-Leyton for the 2012-13 season. The 2013 World Championship was held in Amsterdam on 31 July – 4 August.

The players invited to the 2013 World Championship were.

1. (Israel) Shahar Shenhar (Top Pro Points, at-large)
2. (United States) Reid Duke (Top Pro Points, at-large)
3. (United States) Ben Stark (Top Pro Points, at-large)
4. (United States) Josh Utter-Leyton (2012–13 Player of the year)
5. (United States) Craig Wescoe (Pro Tour Dragon's Maze winner)
6. (Japan) Yuuya Watanabe (2012 Players Championship winner)
7. (United States) Brian Kibler (Top Pro Points, at-large)
8. (Japan) Shuhei Nakamura (Top Pro Points, at-large)
9. (Russia) Dmitriy Butakov (2012 Magic Online champion)
10. (United States) David Ochoa (Top Pro Points, at-large)
11. (Czech Republic) Stanislav Cifka (Pro Tour Return to Ravnica winner)
12. (United States) Tom Martell (Pro Tour Gatecrash winner)
13. (Brazil) Willy Edel (Top Pro Points, Latin America)
14. (United States) Eric Froehlich (Top Pro Points, at-large)
15. (Hong Kong) Lee Shi Tian (Top Pro Points, Asia Pacific)
16. (Czech Republic) Martin Juza (Top Pro Points, at-large)

The tournament consisted of three rounds each of Modern Masters Booster Draft, Modern, Magic 2014 Booster Draft, and Standard. After these twelve rounds, the field of 16 players was cut to the top four. In the semi-finals Shahar Shenhar beat Ben Stark, and Reid Duke beat Josh Utter-Leyton. After trailing 0–2 in the finals, Shahar Shenhar came back to a 3–2 victory over Reid Duke with his UWR Flash Modern Deck, thus becoming the 2013 Magic World Champion.

=== 2013 World Magic Cup ===
(Official coverage)

The second World Magic Cup took place during 2–4 August 2013 at the Amsterdam Convention Factory, in conjunction with the World Championship.

In the finals of the tournament, France won 2–1 against Hungary.

==== Mode ====
The format greatly differs from the inaugural running: Day 1 would still consist of seven Swiss rounds will decide the 32 teams advance to Day 2, but three rounds of Team Sealed Deck and four rounds of Team Standard were played instead. On Day 2, the team play began with teams being sorted, according to seeding, into eight pools of four teams. The teams played in three rounds with the format being Team Sealed Deck. After these rounds, the top two teams from each pool advanced to the second stage, leaving sixteen teams. These teams were then sorted into four pools of four teams, and played three rounds of Team Standard. The Top 8 teams, advanced the top two teams from each pool, will play Team Standard on the final day of the tournament in seeded single-elimination rounds.

On Day 1 and Day 2, Teams must switch one of the members played in the first portion to the player who had not played in the first portion at the beginning of the second portion of the event (i.e. no player can sit out for the whole day). In Team Standard, the same decks must be used throughout the whole event.

Final eight

1. France (Raphaël Lévy, Timothee Simonot, Yann Guthmann, and Stephane Soubrier)
2. Hungary (Tamas Nagy, Adorjan Korbl, Gabor Kocsis, and Ervin Hosszú)
3. Czech Republic (Stanislav Cifka, Leos Kopecky, Kristian Janda, and Michal Mendl)
4. Iceland (Alvin Orri Gislason, Orri Ómarsson, Ragnar Sigurdsson and Hedinn Haraldsson)
5. Austria (Thomas Holzinger, Manuel Danninger, David Reitbauer, and Marc Mühlböck)
6. Estonia (Hannes Kerem, Mikk Kaasik, Rauno Raidma, and Simon Robberts)
7. New Zealand (Walker MacMurdo, Jingwei Zheng, Jason Chung, and Digby Carter)
8. Belgium (Vincent Lemoine, Xavier Vantyghem, Marijn Lybaert, and Emmanuel Delvigne)

== 2014 World Championship ==
(Official coverage)

In 2014, the World Championship and the World Magic Cup took place from 2–7 December 2014. The events were held in conjunction in Nice, France.

For 2014, the World Championship format was altered to include 24 players rather than the 16 players who were invited the previous two years. Day One of the tournament consisted of three rounds of Vintage Masters Draft and four rounds of Modern. Day Two consisted of three rounds of Khans of Tarkir Draft and four rounds of Standard. After these fourteen rounds the Top 4 players in the Swiss standings played in single-elimination rounds in the Standard format.

The final standings were as follows:

1. (Israel) Shahar Shenhar (2013 World Champion) - Decklist
2. (United States) Patrick Chapin (Pro Tour Journey into Nyx winner)
3. Yuuya Watanabe (Pro Point leader Japan)
4. (Japan) Kentaro Yamamoto (8th most Pro Points of otherwise unqualified)
5. (Canada) Shaun McLaren (Pro Tour Born of the Gods winner)
6. Yuuki Ichikawa (Pro Point runner-up Japan)
7. (Slovakia) Ivan Floch (Pro Tour Magic 2015 winner)
8. (United States) William Jensen (Most Pro Points of otherwise unqualified)
9. (United States) Sam Black (6th most Pro Points of otherwise unqualified)
10. (Thailand) Lars Dam (2013 Magic Online Champion)
11. (United States) Josh Utter-Leyton (3rd most Pro Points of otherwise unqualified)
12. (United States) Paul Rietzl (5th most Pro Points of otherwise unqualified)
13. (United States) Owen Turtenwald (Pro Point leader North America)
14. (United States) Reid Duke (Pro Point runner-up North America)
15. (Czech Republic) Stanislav Cifka (2nd most Pro Points of otherwise unqualified)
16. (United States) Tom Martell (4th most Pro Points of otherwise unqualified)
17. (France) Raphaël Lévy (2013 World Magic Cup winner)
18. (France) Jérémy Dezani (2013–14 Player of the Year)
19. (Canada) Jacob Wilson (7th most Pro Points of otherwise unqualified)
20. (Brazil) Willy Edel (Pro Point leader Latin America)
21. (South Korea) Nam Sung-Wook (Pro Point runner-up APAC region)
22. (United States) Raymond Perez Jr. (2013–14 Rookie of the Year)
23. (Brazil) Paulo Vitor Damo da Rosa (Pro Point runner-up Latin America)
24. (Hong Kong) Lee Shi Tian (Pro Point leader APAC region)

Shahar Shenhar became the first player to win the World Championship for a second time as well as the first player to win the title in consecutive years.

=== 2014 World Magic Cup ===
(Official Coverage)

Final eight

1. Denmark (Martin Müller, Simon Nielsen, Thomas Enevoldsen, Lars Birch)
2. Greece (Marios Angelopoulos, Bill Chronopoulos, Panagiotis Savvidis, Socrates Rozakeas)
3. England (Fabrizio Anteri, David Inglis, Francesco Giorgio, Riccardo Reale)
4. United States (Owen Turtenwald, Isaac Sears, Andrew Baeckstrom, Neal Oliver)
5. South Korea (Nam Sung-wook, Oh Joon-hyun, Cho Jeong-woo, Kim Sang-eun)
6. Serbia (Aleksa Telarov, Miodrag Kitanovic, Boris Bajgo, Milos Stajic)
7. Slovakia (Ivan Floch, Jan Tomcani, Michal Guldan, Matej Zatlkaj)
8. Brazil (Willy Edel, Gabriel Fehr, Thiago Saporito, Matheus Rosseto)

== 2015 World Championship ==
The 2015 World Championship took place from 27 to 30 August 2015. The event was originally planned to be held in Barcelona, Spain in conjunction with 2015 World Magic Cup, but was later moved to Seattle, and was held in conjunction with PAX Prime instead.

Some changes to the previous years' invitation structure were announced, with the following announcement by Director of Organized Play, Helene Bergeot at Pro Tour Fate Reforged.

- The 2015 World Championship was the last where the World Magic Cup team-winning captain was invited to
- North America now invited its top four Pro Point earners (it was previously two)
- Europe now invited its top three Pro Point earners (it was previously two)
- Asia-Pacific now invited its top three Pro Point earners (it was previously two for Asia-Pacific and two for Japan, the latter of which was folded into the Asia-Pacific georegion for this event)
- A new slot was added for the player who had earned the most Pro Points at Grand Prix in the 2014–2015 Premier Play season (the number of GPs that count for this slot is uncapped)
- The invitation for Rookie of the Year had been removed

The format of the tournament was 3 rounds of Modern Masters 2015 draft followed by 4 rounds of Modern constructed for Thursday. On Friday, a Magic Origins draft followed by 4 rounds of standard and after a hiatus on Saturday, the top 4 playoffs on Sunday.

The final standings were as follows:

1. (United States) Seth Manfield (Top Pro Points at large) Decklist
2. (United States) Owen Turtenwald (Top Pro Points at large)
3. (United States) Paul Rietzl (Top Pro Points at large)
4. (United States) Sam Black (Top Pro Points North America)
5. (Sweden) Magnus Lantto (2014 Magic Online Champion)
6. (Denmark) Martin Müller (2014 World Magic Cup winning team captain)
7. (Canada) Shaun McLaren (Top Pro Points at large)
8. (Brazil) Thiago Saporito (Top Pro Points Latin America)
9. (Czech Republic) Ondrey Strasky (Top Pro Points North America)
10. (Japan) Yuuya Watanabe (Top Pro Points Asia-Pacific)
11. (Brazil) Paulo Vitor Damo da Rosa (Top Pro Points Latin America)
12. (Canada) Jacob Wilson (Top Pro Points at large)
13. (Sweden) Joel Larsson (Pro Tour Magic Origins winner)
14. (Canada) Alexander Hayne (Grand Prix Pro Point leader)
15. (Denmark) Martin Dang (Pro Tour Dragons of Tarkir winner)
16. (United States) Steve Rubin (Top Pro Points at large)
17. (Japan) Kentaro Yamamoto (Top Pro Points Asia-Pacific)
18. (United States) Mike Sigrist (2014–15 Player of the Year)
19. (United States) Eric Froehlich (Top Pro Points North America)
20. (Hong Kong) Lee Shi Tian (Top Pro Points Asia-Pacific)
21. (United States) Brad Nelson (Top Pro Points North America)
22. (Spain) Antonio Del Moral Leon (Pro Tour Fate Reforged winner)
23. (Israel) Shahar Shenhar (2014 World Champion)
24. (United States) Ari Lax (Pro Tour Khans of Tarkir winner)

=== 2015 World Magic Cup ===
(Official Coverage)

Final eight

1. Italy (Marco Cammilluzzi, Andrea Mengucci, Francesco Bifero and William Pizzi)
2. Thailand (Aekarash Sorakup, Suttipong Popitukgul, Matej Dornik and Chom Pasidparchya)
3. France (Pierre Dagen, Hichem Tedjditi, Fathi Ben Aribi and Arnaud Soumet)
4. Austria (Nikolaus Eigner, Christoph Aukenthaler, Valentin Mackl and Sebastian Fiala-Ibitz)
5. Denmark (Christoffer Larsen, Daniel Lind, Martin Müller and Martin Dang)
6. Guatemala (Fernando José Juárez Oliva, José Andrés Martínez Figueloa, Christopher Andrés Virula Martinez and Wilfredo Bojorquez Castillo)
7. Scotland (Ray Doyle, Stephen Murray, Grant Hislop and Martin Clement)
8. Japan (Kenji Tsumura, Ryoichi Tamada, Yuuya Watanabe and Soyo You)

== 2016 World Championship ==
The 2016 World Championship was held from 1–4 September in Seattle. The formats used in the competition were Eldritch Moon-Shadows over Innistrad Booster Draft for rounds 1–3, Standard for rounds 4–7, Eldritch Moon-Shadows over Innistrad Booster Draft for rounds 8–10, Modern for rounds 11–14, and Standard for the Top 4.

The final standings were as follows:

1. (United States) Brian Braun-Duin (2015–16 Grand Prix Master)
2. (Portugal) Márcio Carvalho (2015–16 Draft Master)
3. (United States) Oliver Tiu (2015–16 Constructed Master)
4. (Japan) Shota Yasooka (Top Pro Points Asia-Pacific)
5. (Czech Republic) Lukas Blohon (Pro Tour Eldritch Moon champion, Top Pro Points Europe)
6. (United States) Luis Scott-Vargas (Outstanding Hall of Famer, Top Pro Points North America)
7. (United States) Jiachen Tao (Pro Tour Oath of the Gatewatch champion)
8. (United States) Seth Manfield (Reigning World Champion, Top Pro Points North America)
9. (Brazil) Thiago Saporito (Top Pro Points Latin America)
10. (United States) Steve Rubin (Pro Tour Shadows over Innistrad champion)
11. (United States) Mike Sigrist (Top Pro Points at large)
12. (United States) Reid Duke (Top Pro Points North America)
13. (United States) Brad Nelson (Top Pro Points at large)
14. (Sweden) Joel Larsson (Top Pro Points Europe)
15. (Brazil) Paulo Vitor Damo da Rosa (Top Pro Points Latin America)
16. (Japan) Yuuya Watanabe (Top Pro Points Asia-Pacific)
17. (United States) Owen Turtenwald (2015–16 Player of the Year, 2015–16 Mid-Season Master, Top Pro Points North America)
18. (Czech Republic) Ondrej Strasky (Top Pro Points at large)
19. (United States) Samuel Pardee (Top Pro Points at large)
20. (Italy) Andrea Mengucci (Top Pro Points at large)
21. (Netherlands) Niels Noorlander (Magic Online Champion)
22. (Japan) Kazuyuki Takimura (Pro Tour Battle for Zendikar champion)
23. (Japan) Ryoichi Tamada (Top Pro Points Asia-Pacific)
24. (Denmark) Martin Müller (Top Pro Points Europe)

=== 2016 World Magic Cup ===
(Official Coverage)
The 2016 World Magic Cup was held from 18 to 20 November in Rotterdam, Netherlands.

Final eight

1. Greece (Panagiotis Papadopoulos, Nikolaos Kaponis, Petros Tziotis, and Bill Chronopoulos)
2. Belgium (Jerome Bastogne, Peter Vieren, Branco Neirynck, and Pascal Vieren)
3. Italy (Alessandro Portaro, Andrea Mengucci, Mattia Rizzi, and Alessandro Casamenti)
4. Belarus (Pavel Miadzvedski, Ihar Klionski, Dmitry Andronchik, and Hleb Bantsevich)
5. Finland (Lauri Pispa, Tuomas Tuominen, Leo Lahonen, and Matti Kuisma)
6. Australia (David Mines, James Wilks, Ryan Cubit, and Garry Lau)
7. Ukraine (Sergiy Sushalskyy, Bogdan Sorozhinsky, Iurii Babych, and Artem Fedorchenko)
8. Panama (Saul Alvarado, Sergio Bonilla, Manuel Succari, and Cesar Segovia)

== 2017 World Championship ==
The 2017 World Championship was held from 6–8 October in Boston. For the 2017 World Championship Wizards of the Coast decided to simplify the invitation criteria, awarding a large portion of invites to the players with the most Pro Points in the 2016–17 Pro Tour season. The formats used in the competition were Ixalan Booster Draft for rounds 1–3, Standard for rounds 4–7, Ixalan Booster Draft for rounds 8–10, Standard for rounds 11–14, and Standard for the Top 4.

The final standings were as follows:

1. (United States) William Jensen (Top Pro Point Earner)
2. (Spain) Javier Dominguez (Top Pro Point Earner)
3. (United States) Josh Utter-Leyton (Magic Online Champion)
4. (Singapore) Kelvin Chew (Top Pro Point Earner)
5. (United States) Reid Duke (North American Geo-Region Champion)
6. (United States) Samuel Black (Top Pro Point Earner)
7. (United States) Seth Manfield (Top Pro Point Earner)
8. (United States) Owen Turtenwald (Top Pro Point Earner)
9. (United States) Gerry Thompson (Pro Tour Amonkhet champion)
10. (Japan) Shota Yasooka (Pro Tour Kaladesh champion)
11. (United States) Christian Calcano (Top Pro Point Earner)
12. (Brazil) Paulo Vitor Damo da Rosa (Pro Tour Hour of Devastation champion, Latin-America Geo Region Champion)
13. (United States) Eric Froehlich (Top Pro Point Earner)
14. (Argentina) Sebastian Pozzo (2016–17 Standard Master)
15. (United States) Brad Nelson (Top Pro Point Earner)
16. (Czech Republic) Martin Juza (2016–17 Draft Master)
17. (Japan) Ken Yukuhiro (Top Pro Point Earner)
18. (Japan) Yuuya Watanabe (Asia-Pacific Geo-Region Champion)
19. (Portugal) Márcio Carvalho (European Geo-Region Champion)
20. (Hong Kong) Lee Shi Tian (Top Pro Point Earner)
21. (Denmark) Martin Müller (Top Pro Point Earner)
22. (United States) Donald Smith (Top Pro Point Earner)
23. (Brazil) Lucas Esper Berthoud (Pro Tour Aether Revolt champion)
24. (United States) Samuel Pardee (Top Pro Point Earner)

=== 2017 World Magic Cup ===
(Official Coverage)
The 2017 World Magic Cup was held from 1–3 December in Nice, France.

Final eight

1. Japan (Yuuya Watanabe, Kenta Harane, and Shota Yasooka)
2. Poland (Grzegorz Kowalski, Radek Kaczmarczyk, and Piotr Glogowski)
3. Germany (Marc Tobiasch, Philipp Krieger, and Moritz Templin)
4. Italy (Andrea Mengucci, Adriano Moscato, and Mattia Rizzi)
5. Wales (Philip Griffiths, Sam Rolph, and Aaron Boyhan)
6. Austria (Oliver Polak-Rottmann, Elias Klocker, and Adrian Johann Schrenk)
7. China (Yuchen Liu, Chao Lu, and Tan Gao)
8. Slovakia (Ivan Floch, Peter Snoha, and Ondrej Kedrovic)

== 2018 World Championship ==
The 2018 World Championship was held from 21 to 23 September in Las Vegas. The formats used in the competition were Dominaria Booster Draft for rounds 1–3, Standard for rounds 4–7, Dominaria Booster Draft for rounds 8–10, Standard for rounds 11–14, and Standard for the Top 4.

The final standings were as follows:

1. (Spain) Javier Dominguez (Top Pro Point Earner)
2. (Poland) Grzegorz Kowalski (Top Pro Point Earner)
3. (United States) Ben Stark (Top Pro Point Earner)
4. (Israel) Shahar Shenhar (Top Pro Point Earner)
5. (United States) Allen Wu (Pro Tour 25th Anniversary champion)
6. (United States) Wyatt Darby (Pro Tour Dominaria champion)
7. (United States) Matthew Nass (Top Pro Point Earner)
8. (United States) Ben Hull (Pro Tour 25th Anniversary champion)
9. (United States) Reid Duke (Top Pro Point Earner)
10. (United States) Mike Sigrist (Top Pro Point Earner)
11. (United States) John Rolf (Top Pro Point Earner)
12. (Portugal) Márcio Carvalho (European Geo-Region Champion)
13. (United States) Brad Nelson (Top Pro Point Earner)
14. (Sweden) Elias Watsfeldt (2017–18 Draft Master)
15. (United States) Brian Braun-Duin (Top Pro Point Earner)
16. (Argentina) Luis Salvatto (Pro Tour Rivals of Ixalan champion, North American Geo-Region Champion)
17. (Italy) Andrea Mengucci (Top Pro Point Earner)
18. (United States) Matthew Severa (2017–18 Constructed Master)
19. (United States) Gregory Orange (Pro Tour 25th Anniversary champion)
20. (United States) Seth Manfield (Pro Tour Ixalan champion, Latin American Geo-Region Champion)
21. (United States) Owen Turtenwald (Top Pro Point Earner)
22. (Czech Republic) Martin Juza (Top Pro Point Earner)
23. (Japan) Ken Yukuhiro (Asia-Pacific Geo-Region Champion)

Gerry Thompson had qualified for the event, but announced very shortly before the start of the tournament, that he was not going to attend in order to protest recent changes to organized play made by Wizards of the Coast. Ken Yukuhiro was disqualified in round 14, sitting in eighth place, for not alerting a judge right away when he noticed that he had failed to de-sideboard after the previous match.

=== 2018 World Magic Cup ===
(Official Coverage)
The 2018 World Magic Cup was held from 14 to 16 December in Barcelona, Spain.

Final eight

1. France (Jean-Emmanuel Depraz, Arnaud Hocquemiller, and Timothée Jammot)
2. Israel (Yuval Zuckerman, Shahar Shenhar, and Amit Etgar)
3. Hong Kong (Wu Kon Fai, Lee Shi Tian, and Alexander Dadyko)
4. Italy (Tian Fa Mun, Andrea Mengucci, and Mattia Basilico)
5. Japan (Ken Yukuhiro, Naoya Nanba, and Moriyama Masahide)
6. China (Liu Yuchen, Song Long, and Xu Ming)
7. Australia (Benaya Lie, David Mines, and Matthew Garnham)
8. Slovakia (Richard Hornansky, Ivan Floch, and Milan Niznansky)

== Performance by country ==
With William "Huey" Jensen's win in 2017 the United States extended its lead over Japan for most Individual World Championships. The United States has also won the most team titles, and have had most competitors amongst the final eight individually. Germany, France, the Netherlands, Brazil and Israel are the only other countries with more than one champion. Canada, Italy and Austria are the most successful nations that have never won a title.

Country	Wins	Top 8	Team Wins
United States	6	47	8
Japan	4	24	2
Israel	3	3	0
France	2	12	1
Germany	2	9	2
Netherlands	2	9	1
Brazil	2	8	0
Switzerland	1	3	1
Finland	1	6	0
Portugal	1	5	0
Czech Republic	1	3	0
Spain	1	2	0
Australia	1	1	0
Canada	0	10	1
Slovakia	0	2	1
China	0	0	1
Denmark	0	2	1
Austria	0	5	0
Italy	0	6	1
Sweden	0	4	0
Belgium	0	2	0
England	0	3	0
Estonia	0	1	0
Argentina	0	1	0
Norway	0	1	0
Malaysia	0	3	0
(Republic of Ireland) Ireland	0	1	0
Singapore	0	1	0
Wales	0	1	0
Taiwan	0	0	1

As of 5 August 2013
