= Jean-Emmanuel Depraz =

French Magic: The Gathering card player

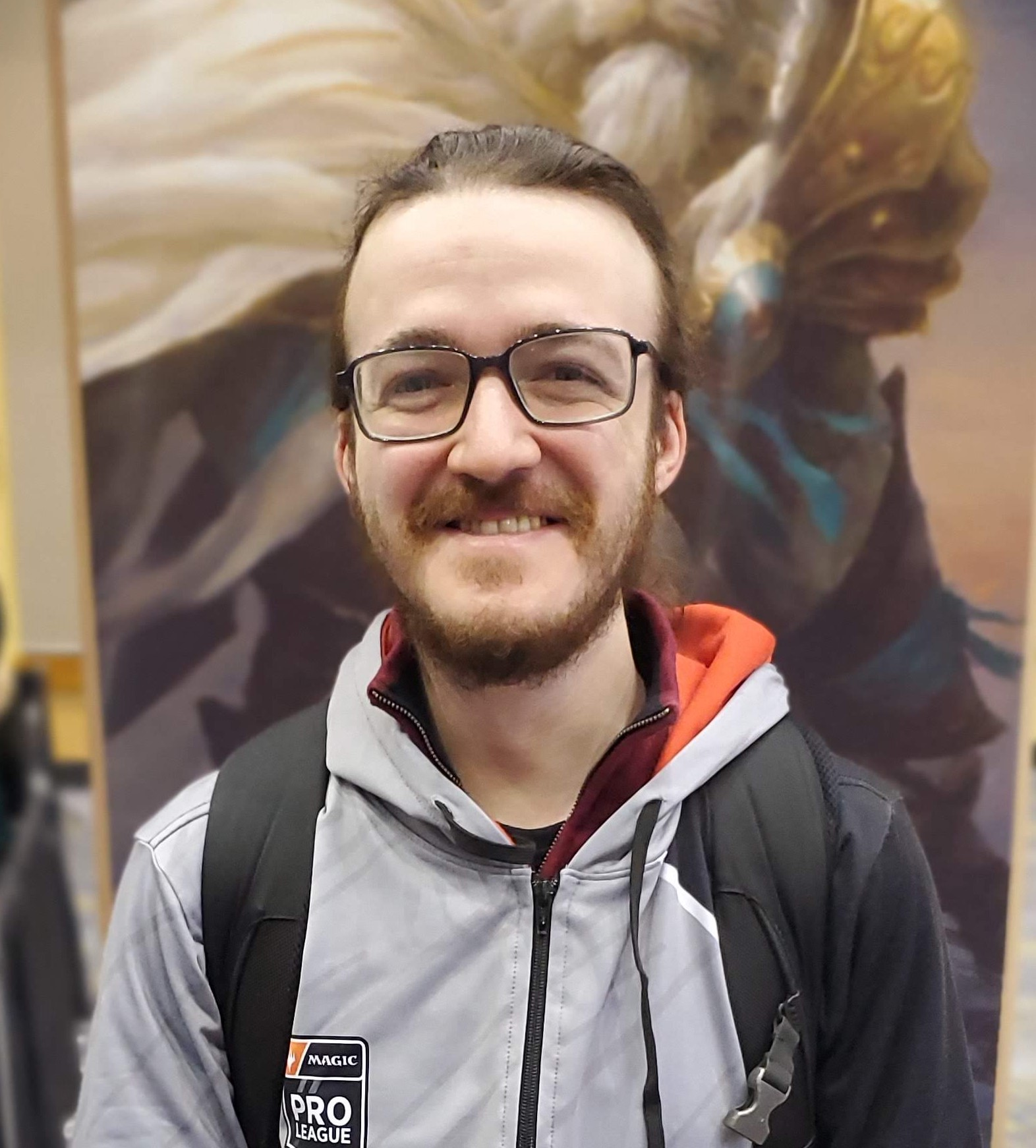
- Depraz at MagicCon Chicago in 2024
- Nickname: JiRock
- Born: 22 June 1994 (age 32)
- Pro Tour debut: 2014
- Winnings: $445,900
- Grand Prix wins (Top 8): 1 (1)

Jean-Emmanuel Depraz, nicknamed JiRock (born 22 June 1994), is a French Magic: The Gathering player, and the 2023 World Champion.

== Magic career ==
Depraz says that he was introduced to Magic: The Gathering in 2005, when a friend shared his cards, and they played for fun. He began to attend competitive events from 2011 through 2013, and first qualified for the Magic: The Gathering Pro Tour in 2014. However he failed to repeat the qualification the following year, and it took another three years until he qualified for the Pro Tour by winning the Warsaw Grand Prix in 2017.

After that, starting in 2018, Depraz had a series of successes, including a Top 8 appearance in Bilbao, and a victory in Barcelona as the captain of the French team which won the final World Magic Cup, with Arnaud Hocquemiller, and Timothée Jammot. At the end of 2018, Depraz was one of the first 32 players, and the only one from France, invited to the Magic Pro League, the esports Player's Tour equivalent. That year, Depraz says, he abandoned literature, the field he was studying before becoming a professional Magic player.

In 2019, Depraz made two more Top 8 finishes, including one where he came in second to Javier Dominguez of Spain, the 2018 World Champion, and the finals of the overall 2019 Magic: The Gathering World Championship, finishing in 7th place. In 2020, Depraz took second place at the online Players Tour, though the Championship was not held due to the COVID-19 pandemic. In 2021, Depraz came in second place to Yuta Takahashi of Japan in the 27th World Championship, which was held online in the MTG Arena program. Depraz says he does not regret his near misses at the title from those years, and learned a lot from them; though he would have loved to win, as the World Championship prize included appearing on his own Magic card.

In September 2023, Depraz won the 29th Magic: The Gathering World Championship in Las Vegas. The three day event included the 110 best players of the season, five of whom were French, including Depraz and Gabriel Nassif. After two days, only Depraz remained of the Frenchmen among the top eight bracket, which was made of players from seven countries. He defeated American Greg Orange, in a close match where he lost the first two games and needed to win all of the last three to continue. He followed with easier matches against Australian Anthony Lee, and Japanese Kazune Kosaka to win the title and prize of US$100,000. The title also comes with the privilege of having the winner's likeness on a card, generally released 1–2 years after their victory. Depraz's winning deck included three copies of "Faerie Mastermind", the card made depicting Yuta Takahashi, who defeated him for the World Championship in 2021.

In September 2025, Wizards of the Coast announced the card that would bear Depraz's likeness. "Formidable Speaker" is part of the Lorwyn Eclipsed set and depicts Depraz as an elf druid. Following the trend of some other World Champion cards, the flavour text bears his full name and the Championship Series Number (XXIX, or 29) of his Championship win.

== Personal life ==
Jean-Emmanuel Depraz is the son of philosopher Natalie Depraz. He lives in Paris.
