= Natalie Depraz =

French philosopher

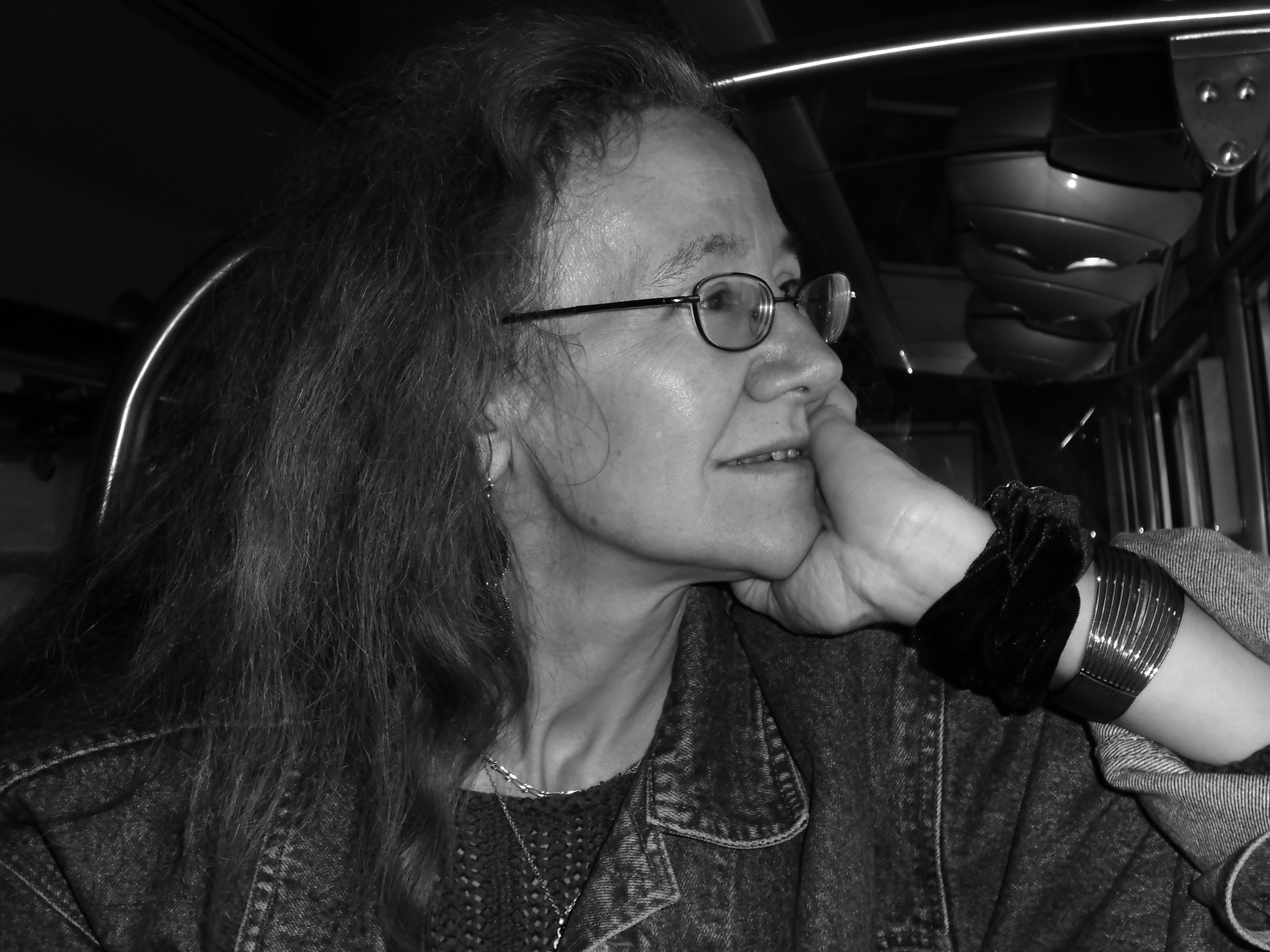
- Depraz in 2016
- Born: 13 December 1964
- Alma mater: Paris Nanterre University; St. Sergius Institute
- Political party: La France insoumise
- Spouse(s): Franck Viellart, Frédéric Mauriac
- Academic career
- Doctoral advisor: Jean-François Courtine

Natalie Depraz (born 1964) is a French philosopher. She is a specialist in German philosophy, phenomenology, and, more specifically, Edmund Husserl. She is a professor at the University of Rouen Normandy and an academic member of the Husserl Archives at the École normale supérieure (ENS/CNRS). She is the founder of the l’École rouennaise de phénoménologie (Rouen School of Phenomenology).

== Personal life and education ==
Natalie Depraz was born in 1964.

She graduated from the École normale supérieure de Fontenay-Saint-Cloud (1984) and obtained her agrégation in philosophy in 1988. In 1993, she defended her doctoral thesis at the Paris Nanterre University, entitled: L'altérité entre transcendance et incarnation, le statut de l'intersubjectivité chez Husserl.

She has four children, including Magic: The Gathering world champion Jean-Emmanuel Depraz.

== Career ==
From 1995 until Francisco Varela's death in 2001, she worked closely with the neurobiologist and the psychologist Pierre Vermersch, with whom she wrote À l'épreuve de l'expérience : pour une pratique phénoménologique (2011), published in English in 2003 under the title: On becoming aware. A pragmatics of experiencing. This early research on the link between phenomenology and neuroscience has kept her busy ever since.

After having been a resident at the Fondation Thiers, then a secondary school teacher for three years, she became a lecturer at the University of Paris-Sorbonne University in 2000. After her habilitation in 2004, she was elected professor at the University of Rouen Normandy in 2006. In 2018, she founded the Rouen School of Phenomenology, which she continues to direct.

Since 2020, she holds the Chair of Excellence in Philosophy at Galatasaray University in Istanbul: "Phenomenology of Deeper Learning Systems via Networks of Convolutive Neurons "4.

She is the author of some fifteen books, including Attention et vigilance, à la croisée de la phénoménologie et des sciences cognitives (2014) and La surprise du sujet. Un sujet cardial (2018), translator of numerous texts by Husserl and Fink, and editor of some twenty collective works. She has also published two novels, in 2019 and 2021.

She was an unsuccessful candidate in the 2017 French legislative election, 2020 Paris municipal election, and 2022 French legislative election.
