= Seth Manfield =

American Magic: The Gathering player (born 1990)

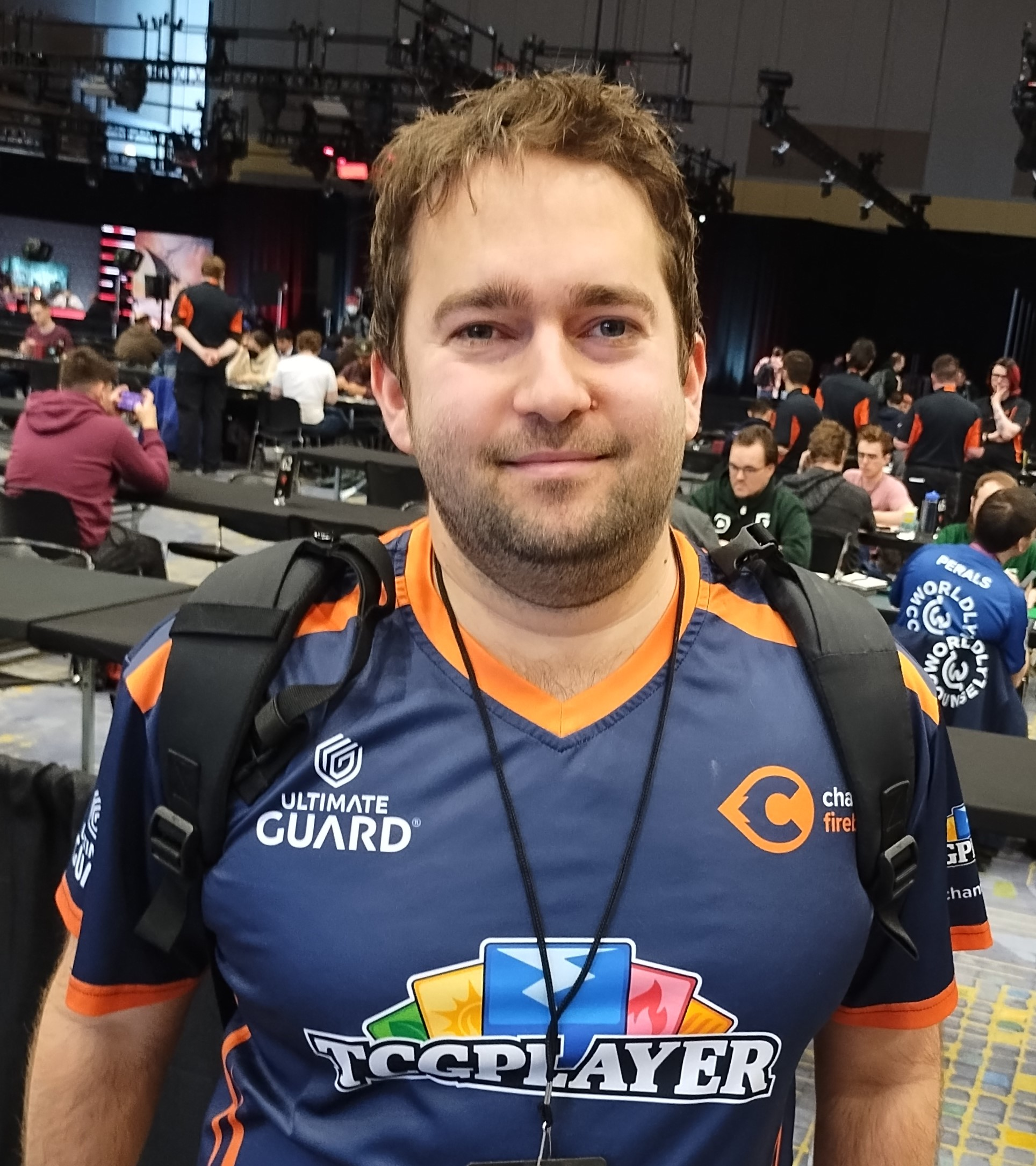
- Manfield in 2025
- Born: September 14, 1990 (age 36)
- Nationality: (United States) American
- Pro Tour debut: Pro Tour Geneva 2007
- Winnings: US$294,455
- Pro Tour wins (Top 8): 2(5)
- Grand Prix wins (Top 8): 5 (10)
- Lifetime Pro Points: 344

Seth Manfield (born September 14, 1990) is an American Magic: The Gathering player and current World Champion. He is a two-time world champion, having previously won the 2015 World Championship. His other accomplishments include sixth-place finish at Pro Tour Fate Reforged earlier that same year, and five Grand Prix wins. In 2018, he was inducted into the Magic: The Gathering Hall of Fame. In 2020, he was signed on by Team Envy.

He is the son of bridge world champion Ed Manfield (1943–1999).

== Achievements ==
Season	Event type	Location	Format	Date	Rank
2007	Grand Prix	Daytona Beach	Sealed and Booster Draft	17–18 November 2007	1
2013–14	Grand Prix	Kansas City	Modern	6–7 July 2013	1
2013–14	Grand Prix	Toronto	Sealed and Booster Draft	30 November – 1 December 2013	5
2013–14	Grand Prix	Dallas-Fort Worth	Standard	7–8 December 2013	6
2014–15	Grand Prix	Ottawa	Sealed and Booster Draft	22–23 November 2014	1
2014–15	Pro Tour	Washington, D.C.	Modern and Booster Draft	6–8 February 2015	6
2015–16	Worlds	Seattle	Special	28–30 August 2015	1
2015–16	Grand Prix	Albuquerque	Limited	16–17 April 2016	4
2015–16	Pro Tour	Madrid	Standard and Booster Draft	22–24 April 2016	3
2015–16	Grand Prix	New York	Standard	7-8 May 2016	1
2015–16	Grand Prix	Costa Rica	Standard	4-5 June 2016	1
2015–16	Grand Prix	Sydney	Limited	30-31 July 2016	4
2016–17	Grand Prix	Providence	Standard	22-23 October 2016	2
2016-17	Pro Tour	Kyoto	Standard and Booster Draft	28-30 July 2017	8

Last updated: 4 November 2016
Source: Event Coverage at Wizards.com

== Family ==
His father is Ed Manfield, a champion bridge player. He has a daughter born in 2015.

Preceded by (Israel) Shahar Shenhar	Magic World Champion; 2015	Succeeded by (United States) Brian Braun-Duin
