= Martin Jůza =

Czech Magic: The Gathering player (born 1987)

- Born: 8 June 1987 (age 39)
- Nationality: (Czech Republic) Czech
- Pro Tour debut: Pro Tour New Orleans 2003
- Winnings: $230,510
- Pro Tour wins (Top 8): 0 (3)
- Grand Prix wins (Top 8): 4 (24)
- Lifetime Pro Points: 445
- Planeswalker Level: 50 (Archmage)

Martin Jůza is a Czech Magic: The Gathering player. Over the course of his career, Jůza has won the Czech national championship, made the top eight of a Pro Tour three times, and won four Grand Prix tournaments.

== Career ==
Jůza's Pro Tour career began in 2003 when he made his debut with a 194th-place finish at Pro Tour New Orleans. He would go on to make one more Pro Tour appearance that season, a 163rd-place finish at the World Championship. The following season, he had two Pro Tour appearances again. He also had his first high level finish that season when he won the Czech National Championship. Jůza put up similar results in 2006 and 2007, playing two Pro Tours both years, making his country's national team in 2006, and qualifying for Worlds as the alternate in 2007.

The 2008 season was Jůza's breakout year. It was the first time he played every Pro Tour, and he only finished outside the top twenty once. After a 10th-place finish in Kuala Lumpur, and a 19th place in Hollywood, he made his first Pro Tour top eight at Pro Tour Berlin 2008. In the quarterfinals, Jůza was paired against one of his play test partners, former Rookie of the Year Sebastian Thaler, with Thaler winning the Elves mirror match by three games to two. Jůza rounded out the season with a 50th-place finish at the World Championship to earn level 7 standing in the Pro Players Club.

After his breakout season, Jůza very much adopted the Pro Tour lifestyle, playing fourteen of nineteen Grand Prix in 2009. He had a strong start to the season, earning 18 pro points by mid March. After a string of midfield finishes from March through July, Jůza made back to back Grand Prix finals, losing to Olivier Ruel in Brighton, and to Ryuichi Arita in Bangkok. At Pro Tour Austin, Jůza made his second Pro Tour top eight. Paired against Naoki Shimizu, he was once again defeated in the quarterfinal. To finish the season, Jůza made the top eight of Grand Prix Tampa Bay, and finished 41st at Worlds. With 64 pro points, Jůza finished third in the Player of the Year race and gained the highest Pro Players Club Level, 8.

The following season, Jůza did not do so well on the Pro Tour, his best finish being a 30th place at Pro Tour San Diego; and he earned only 17 pro points from his Pro Tour results. However, he made up for it on the Grand Prix circuit. Jůza played all but one of the Grand Prix, winning Grand Prix Portland and Bochum, and making the top eight of Grand Prix Nashville. Earning 37 points off tour, Jůza's 54 point total earned him fourth place in the Player of the Year race and level 8 in the Pro Players Club again.

In 2011, Jůza's Grand Prix dominance continued. Over the course of the year, he reached top eight of Grand Prix in Denver, Kobe, Santiago, and Hiroshima. His win in Hiroshima made Jůza the first European to win a Grand Prix in Japan, and he joined Raphaël Lévy, Shuhei Nakamura, and Alex Shvartsman as the fourth player to have won Grand Prix in Europe, North America, and Asia. On the Pro Tour, he had unremarkable results in Paris and Philadelphia, finishing below 100th place both times, but finished just one win short of making the top eight at Pro Tour Nagoya. For the third year in a row, Juza earned enough points to reach level 8 in the Pro Players Club, finishing fourth overall in the Player of the Year race.

Jůza made the top eight of one additional Grand Prix events in the 2012 season, in Madrid, and finished the season with enough points to achieve Platinum status in the new Pro Players Club system. In August, Jůza played in the inaugural Magic Players Championship (later renamed The World Championship), finishing 9th, as well as the World Magic Cup, where he was the captain of the Czech team. In the 2012–13 season, Jůza repeated his performance from the previous Grand Prix Bochum by winning the event again, and made the top eight of an additional three Grand Prix (in Manila, Philadelphia and Sydney). He once again attained Platinum status, and qualified for the World Championship for the second year in a row. This event did not go well for Jůza, however; he finished last. The 2013–14 season was a quiet one for Jůza. He made the top eight of three Grand Prix (Providence, Prague and Hong Kong), but needed to finish in the top 16 of the last Pro Tour of the year, Pro Tour Magic 2015 in order to reach Platinum status once again. He succeeded in doing so by finishing 11th, and reached the top level in the Pro Players Club for the sixth season in a row.

In the 2014–15 season, despite finishing in the top eight of four Grand Prix events (Strasbourg, Manila, Mexico City, Seville), Jůza failed to attain Platinum status. He ended the season on 42 points, enough for Gold, but four points shy of Platinum.

=== Achievements ===
Season	Event type	Location	Format	Date	Rank
2005	Nationals	Czech Republic	Standard and Booster Draft	2005	1
2006	Nationals	Czech Republic	Standard and Booster Draft	2006	1
2007	Nationals	Czech Republic	Standard and Booster Draft	2007	4
2008	Pro Tour	Berlin	Extended	31 October – 2 November 2008	6
2009	Grand Prix	Brighton	Sealed and Booster Draft	8–9 August 2009	2
2009	Grand Prix	Bangkok	Sealed and Booster Draft	22–23 August 2009	2
2009	Pro Tour	Austin	Extended and Booster Draft	16–18 October 2009	7
2009	Grand Prix	Tampa Bay	Sealed and Booster Draft	24–25 October 2009	8
2010	Grand Prix	Portland	Sealed and Booster Draft	11–12 September 2010	1
2010	Grand Prix	Bochum	Sealed and Booster Draft	30–31 October 2010	1
2010	Grand Prix	Nashville	Sealed and Booster Draft	20–21 November 2010	7
2011	Grand Prix	Denver	Sealed and Booster Draft	19–20 February 2011	2
2011	Grand Prix	Kobe	Extended	23–24 April 2011	7
2011	Grand Prix	Santiago	Sealed and Booster Draft	22–23 October 2011	5
2011	Grand Prix	Hiroshima	Standard	29–30 October 2011	1
2012	Grand Prix	Madrid	Sealed and Booster Draft	25–26 February 2012	8
2012–13	Grand Prix	Manila	Standard	16–17 June 2012	6
2012–13	Grand Prix	Philadelphia	Sealed and Booster Draft	27–28 October 2012	3
2012–13	Grand Prix	Bochum	Standard	17–18 November 2012	1
2012–13	Grand Prix	Sydney	Limited	19–20 January 2013	6
2013–14	Grand Prix	Providence	Team Limited	8–9 June 2013	4
2013–14	Grand Prix	Prague	Limited	31 August–1 September 2013	5
2013–14	Grand Prix	Hong Kong	Sealed and Booster Draft	19–20 October 2013	2
2014–15	Grand Prix	Strasbourg	Sealed and Booster Draft	29–30 November 2014	3
2014–15	Grand Prix	Manila	Standard	3–4 January 2015	7
2014–15	Grand Prix	Mexico City	Sealed and Booster Draft	31 January–1 February 2015	7
2014–15	Grand Prix	Seville	Standard	14–15 February 2015	5
2015–16	Grand Prix	London	Standard	15–16 August 2015	7
2015–16	Grand Prix	Paris	Standard	19-20 March 2016	4
2016–17	Pro Tour	Dublin	Standard and Booster Draft	3–5 February 2017	8

Last updated: 5 February 2017
Source: Event Coverage at Wizards.com
