= Paul Rietzl =

American Magic: The Gathering player

- Nickname: Little Darwin
- Nationality: United States
- Pro Tour debut: 2002 Pro Tour Osaka
- Winnings: US$248,990
- Pro Tour wins (Top 8): 1 (4)
- Grand Prix wins (Top 8): 2 (15)
- Lifetime Pro Points: 424
- Planeswalker Level: 48 (Archmage)

Paul Rietzl is an American Magic: The Gathering player. His greatest success was his win at Pro Tour Amsterdam in 2010, but his resume includes three more Pro Tour top eights, and thirteen Grand Prix top eights, including two wins. He was inducted into the Magic: The Gathering Hall of Fame in 2014.

== Magic: The Gathering ==
=== Career ===
Paul Rietzl grew up in Boston, near the game store YourMoveGames, owned by future Hall of Famer Rob Dougherty, and was a longtime member of Team Your Move Games. Rietzl played his first Pro Tour, Pro Tour Osaka, when he was 16 years old, and his first major result came at Grand Prix Anaheim in 2003, where he made the top eight. The top eight also featured future Hall of Fame members Ben Stark and Ben Rubin. Rietzl would lose in the quarterfinals to Peter Szigeti, taking 6th place in the overall standings. Rietzl went on to make the top eight of the very next North American Grand Prix, in Oakland. Again, Paul lost in the quarterfinals, taking 7th place.

From 2002 to 2006, Rietzl was a regular at the Pro Tour. He didn't make any top eights, but put up some solid performances, including a 14th-place finish at Pro Tour Kobe 2004, and a 26th-place finish at Pro Tour San Diego 2004. However, after Pro Tour Charleston 2006, Rietzl took a break from competitive play, his only Pro Tour until 2009 being Pro Tour San Diego 2007.

After his break, Rietzl returned to competitive play with a splash in 2009. Rietzl made his third Grand Prix top eight at Grand Prix Chicago. He made it to the semifinals this time, losing out to Andrew Probasco, and took third place in the tournament. Rietzl's result at the event qualified him for Pro Tour Honolulu 2009. He prepared for the tournament with various prominent players including Ben Rubin, Gabriel Nassif and Brian Kibler. Rietzl made his first Pro Tour top eight in Honolulu, losing in the semifinals to eventual winner Kazuya Mitamura. He has not missed a Pro Tour since.

Rietzl would have the biggest success of his career in the 2010 season, winning Pro Tour Amsterdam 2010. The Pro Tour was noted for one of the most impressive Sunday rosters in Magic: The Gathering history, which included Kai Budde, Brian Kibler, Guillaume Wafo-Tapa and future Player of the Year Brad Nelson. Rietzl's win would be all the more impressive for the fact that he did not lose a single game within the top eight, beating Thomas Ma, Michael Jacob and Brad Nelson 3–0 in their best of five game matches. Rietzl prepared for the Pro Tour with various pro players, but gave particular credit to Gabriel Nassif, who helped design his deck.

Rietzl went on to make his third Pro Tour top eight in as many years at Pro Tour Paris 2011. Rietzl would defeat Patrick Chapin in the quarterfinals and Vincent Lemoine in the semifinals to face Ben Stark in the finals of the tournament. Ultimately, Paul lost 3–1 to Stark, finishing in second place.

Pro Tour Paris was held alongside Grand Prix Paris, which started the day after the Pro Tour. Having secured his place in the Top 8 of the Pro Tour, Rietzl took the unusual step of entering the Grand Prix, largely because he believed he would lose quickly in the quarterfinals to Patrick Chapin. After three byes, Rietzl went 6–1 in the Grand Prix, earning a place in Day 2 of the event; this meant that he was playing the top eight of the Pro Tour as well as Day 2 of the Grand Prix. Ultimately, Rietzl would take 24th place at the Grand Prix despite also playing in the top eight of the Pro Tour, and forfeiting a match in the Grand Prix due to having to play his Pro Tour quarterfinal match. Rietzl's overall record for the weekend was 24-6-1.

Rietzl's fourth Pro Tour top eight came in the 2013–14 season, at Pro Tour Theros in Dublin, where Rietzl and Patrick Chapin played a black-white midrange deck that would ultimately result in 9th-place finish for Chapin and a 6th-place finish for Rietzl, losing 2–3 in the semifinals to Makihito Mihara. He came close to a fifth top eight later in the season, at Pro Tour Journey into Nyx in Atlanta, but he finished 13th. Rietzl's overall performance during the season qualified him for the 2014 World Championship, where he finished 12th.

Rietzl became eligible for the Pro Tour Hall of Fame in 2011, having played in his first Pro Tour over ten seasons prior and having amassed over 150 lifetime pro points. Rietzl placed 20th, 21st and 20th in the 2011, 2012 and 2013 ballots respectively. In 2014, he was voted into the Hall, placing second with 72.59% support. He was inducted at Pro Tour Khans of Tarkir in Honolulu, alongside Guillaume Wafo-Tapa and Makihito Mihara.

In the 2014–15 season, despite not finishing in the top eight of any Pro Tours, Rietzl managed to accumulate enough pro points to qualify for the World Championship for a second year running. This was in large part due to consistently solid Pro Tour finishes; he finished 40th, 35th, 27th and 60th respectively at the season's four Pro Tour events, and also put up two Grand Prix top eights, at GP Salt Lake City and GP San Jose.

=== Top 8 finishes ===
Season	Event type	Location	Format	Date	Rank
2003–04	Grand Prix	Anaheim	Extended	December 13–14, 2003	6
2003–04	Grand Prix	Oakland	Limited	February 7–8, 2004	7
2009	Grand Prix	Chicago	Legacy	March 7–8, 2009	3
2009	Pro Tour	Honolulu	Block Constructed and Booster Draft	June 5–7, 2009	3
2010	Pro Tour	Amsterdam	Extended and Booster Draft	September 3–5, 2010	1
2011	Pro Tour	Paris	Standard and Booster Draft	February 10–13, 2011	2
2012	Grand Prix	Seattle-Tacoma	Limited	March 3–4, 2012	6
2012	Grand Prix	Mexico City	Limited	March 24–25, 2012	1
2012–13	Grand Prix	Anaheim	Block Constructed	May 26–27, 2012	2
2012–13	Grand Prix	San Jose	Team Limited	October 13–14, 2012	1
2012–13	Grand Prix	Portland	Modern	May 11–12, 2013	8
2013–14	Pro Tour	Dublin	Standard and Booster Draft	October 11–13, 2013	6
2013–14	Grand Prix	Albuquerque	Standard	November 23–24, 2013	8
2014–15	Grand Prix	Salt Lake City	Limited	September 6–7, 2014	5
2014–15	Grand Prix	San Jose	Team Limited	January 31–February 1, 2015	2
2015–16	Grand Prix	San Diego	Standard	August 8–9, 2015	3
2015–16	Worlds	Seattle	Special	August 27–30, 2015	3
2015–16	Grand Prix	Oklahoma City	Modern	September 12–13, 2015	7
2016–17	Grand Prix	Portland	Standard	August 13–14, 2016	7
2016–17	Grand Prix	Louisville	Team Limited	September 10–11, 2016	4

Last updated: October 15, 2016
Source: Event Coverage at Wizards.com
