= Magic: The Gathering Pro Tour season 2010 =

2010 Pro Tour season
- Pro Player of the Year: (United States) Brad Nelson
- Rookie of the Year: (Italy) Andrea Giarola
- World Champion: (France) Guillaume Matignon
- Pro Tours: 4
- Grands Prix: 18
- Hall of Fame inductions: (France) Gabriel Nassif (United States) Brian Kibler (Netherlands) Bram Snepvangers
- Start of season: 13 February 2010
- End of season: 12 December 2010

The 2010 Pro Tour season was the fifteenth season of the Magic: The Gathering Pro Tour. It began on 13 February 2010 with Grand Prix Oakland, and ended on 12 December 2010 with the conclusion of the 2010 World Championship in Chiba, Japan. The season consisted of eighteen Grand Prixs, and four Pro Tours, located in San Diego, San Juan, Amsterdam, and Chiba. Gabriel Nassif, Brian Kibler, and Bram Snepvangers were inducted into the Hall of Fame at the World Championship in Chiba. Although the season formally ended with the conclusion of the World Championship, the final title of season was not awarded until three months later. Guillaume Matignon and Brad Nelson tied for Player of the Year. The title was decided by a single match between the two at the 2011 Pro Tour in Paris, which Nelson won by four games to two.

== Mode ==
Four Pro Tours and eighteen Grand Prixs were held in the 2010 season. Further Pro Points were awarded at national championships. These Pro Points were used mainly to determine the Pro Player club levels of players participating in these events, but also decide which player was awarded the Pro Player of the year title at the end of the season. Based on final standings Pro Points were awarded as follows:

Rank	Pro Points awarded at			
Rank	Pro Tour	Grand Prix	Nationals	Worlds (Team)
1	25	10	10	6
2	20	8	8	5
3–4	16	6	6	4
5–8	12	5	4	3
9–12	8	4	2	2
13–16	8	3	1	1
17–24	7	2		
25–32	6	2		
33–64	5	1		
65–100	4			
101–200	3			
201+	2			

== Grand Prix – Oakland ==
GP Oakland (13–14 February)

- Format: Extended
- Attendance: 770
1. (United States) Matt Nass
2. (United States) Adam Yurchick
3. (United States) Conley Woods
4. (United States) Travis Woo
5. (United States) Pat Cox
6. (United States) Joby Parish
7. (Czech Republic) Petr Brozek
8. (Japan) Tomoharu Saitou

== Pro Tour – San Diego (19–21 February 2010) ==
Pro Tour San Diego was held at the San Diego Convention Center. The tournament began with five rounds of Standard, followed by three rounds of Zendikar-Worldwake Booster Draft on the first day. At the end of day one Gabriel Nassif and Luis Scott-Vargas were the only undefeated players left. The second day began with another Zendikar-Worldwake Booster Draft and was followed by five additional rounds of Standard. Luis Scott-Vargas was the story of the day, having won all his matches in day two as well, thus becoming only the second player to win each match in the Swiss portion of a Pro Tour, and the first to achieve this feat over sixteen rounds.

Of the final eight players only Scott-Vargas had ever reached the top eight before. He quickly defeated his Dutch opponent. In the remaining quarter-finals the other Americans, Craig Wescoe and Kyle Boggemes, won their matches as well. German Simon Görtzen won the fourth quarter, defeating the Belgian Niels Viaene. In the semi-final Görtzen ended Scott-Vargas's streak, thus making it to the final where he played Boggemes. Both players had chosen Jund (red-green-black) decks. Eventually the German prevailed in a close match over the full five games.

=== Tournament data ===
Prize pool: $230,795
Players: 413
Format: Standard, Booster Draft (Zendikar-Worldwake)
Head Judge: Sheldon Menery

=== Top 8 ===
Quarter-finals
1	Luis Scott-Vargas	3
8	Jeroen Kanis	0
4	Simon Görtzen	3
5	Niels Viaene	1
2	Daniel Gräfensteiner	1
7	Craig Wescoe	3
3	Kyle Boggemes	3
6	Yoshihiko Ikawa	0

Semi-finals
Luis Scott-Vargas	1
Simon Görtzen	3
Craig Wescoe	1
Kyle Boggemes	3

Finals
Simon Görtzen	3
Kyle Boggemes	2

=== Final standings ===
Place	Player	Prize	Pro Points	Comment
1	(Germany) Simon Görtzen	$40,000	25	
2	(United States) Kyle Boggemes	$20,000	20	
3	(United States) Luis Scott-Vargas	$15,000	16	3rd Final day
4	(United States) Craig Wescoe	$13,000	16	
5	(Germany) Daniel Gräfensteiner	$11,000	12	
6	(Belgium) Niels Viaene	$10,500	12	Pro Tour Debut
7	(Japan) Yoshihiko Ikawa	$10,000	12	
8	(Netherlands) Jeroen Kanis	$9,500	12	

=== Pro Player of the year standings ===
Rank	Player	Pro Points
1	(Germany) Simon Görtzen	25
2	(United States) Kyle Boggemes	20
3	(United States) Luis Scott-Vargas	18
4	(United States) Craig Wescoe	16

== Grand Prixs – Madrid, Kuala Lumpur, Yokohama, Brussels, Houston, Lyon, Washington D.C. ==
GP Madrid (27–28 February)

- Format: Legacy
- Attendance: 2228
1. (Germany) Andreas Müller
2. (Czech Republic) David Do Anh
3. (England) Richard Bland
4. (Japan) Tomoharu Saitou
5. (Spain) Rubén Gonzalez
6. (Spain) Lluis Restoy
7. (Spain) Alejandro Delgado
8. (Netherlands) Sven Dijt

GP Brussels (27–28 March)

- Format: Standard
- Attendance: 1667
1. (Italy) Emanuele Giusti
2. (Hungary) Zoltan Szoke
3. (Hungary) Tamas Nagy
4. (England) Steve Bernstein
5. (France) Nicolas Lambach
6. (Belgium) Christophe Gregoir
7. (Italy) Francesco Cipolleschi
8. (Sweden) Ludvig Londos

GP Washington, D.C. (22–23 May)

- Format: Standard
- Attendance: 1932
1. (United States) Brad Nelson
2. (United States) Owen Turtenwald
3. (United States) Kyle Boggemes
4. (United States) Joshua Wagener
5. (United States) Brett Blackman
6. (United States) Michael Stanfar
7. (United States) Brad Carpenter
8. (Brazil) Carlos Romão

GP Kuala Lumpur (13–14 March)

- Format: Standard
- Attendance: 518
1. (Singapore) Ding Yuan Leong
2. (China) Xue Tong Du
3. (Thailand) Jakguy Subcharoen
4. (Japan) Shingo Fukuta
5. (Japan) Shouta Yasooka
6. (Malaysia) Wei Han Chin
7. (Philippines) Raffy Sarto
8. (China) Zhiyang Zhang

GP Houston (3–4 April)

- Format: Extended
- Attendance: 652
1. (United States) Adam Yurchick
2. (United States) Shaun Rodriquez
3. (United States) Kenneth Ellis
4. (United States) Todd Anderson
5. (Japan) Shuhei Nakamura
6. (Brazil) Paulo Vitor Damo da Rosa
7. (United States) Charles Lancaster
8. (United States) Pete Picard

GP Yokohama (20–21 March)

- Format: Extended
- Attendance: 1122
1. (Japan) Katsuhiro Mori
2. (Japan) Masashiro Kuroda
3. (Japan) Min-su Kim
4. (Japan) Takashi Ishihara
5. (Taiwan) Kuo Tzu-Ching
6. (Japan) Yasunori Baba
7. (Japan) Atsuo Se
8. (Japan) Tomoyuki Honnami

GP Lyon (8–9 May)

- Format: Limited
- Attendance: 1425
1. (Germany) Florian Koch
2. (Germany) Tobias Gräfensteiner
3. (Belgium) Peter Vieren
4. (Netherlands) Bram Snepvangers
5. (Sweden) Joakim Almelund
6. (Czech Republic) Lukas Blohon
7. (Czech Republic) Vladimir Komanicky
8. (Italy) Marcello Calvetto

== Pro Tour San Juan (28–30 May 2010) ==
The second Pro Tour of the season was held in Puerto Rico Convention Center in San Juan, Puerto Rico. The formats were Zendikar Block Constructed and Rise of the Eldrazi Booster Draft with the Top 8 doing another Rise of the Eldrazi draft.

The following players made it to the final draft table (clockwise in order starting at seed one): Guillaume Matignon, Jeremy Neeman, Andrea Giarola, Paulo Vitor da Rosa, Brad Nelson, Noah Swartz, Koutarou Ootsuka, Josh Utter-Leyton. In his fifth individual Top 8 appearance Paulo Vitor da Rosa was finally able to win a quarterfinal match. Defeating Noah Swartz in the semifinals and Guillaume Matignon in the final, Paulo eventually claimed his first Pro Tour trophy.

=== Tournament data ===
Prize pool: $230,795
Players: 396
Format: Booster Draft (Rise of the Eldrazi), Zendikar Block Constructed
Head Judge: Sheldon Menery

=== Top 8 ===
Quarter-finals
1	Guillaume Matignon	3
8	Brad Nelson	0
4	Andrea Giarola	3
5	Koutarou Ootsuka	2
2	Paulo Vitor da Rosa	3
7	Josh Utter-Leyton	2
3	Jeremy Neeman	1
6	Noah Swartz	3

Semi-finals
Guillaume Matignon	3
Andrea Giarola	2
Paulo Vitor da Rosa	3
Noah Swartz	1

Finals
Guillaume Matignon	2
Paulo Vitor da Rosa	3

=== Final standings ===
Place	Player	Prize	Pro Points	Comment
1	(Brazil) Paulo Vitor Damo da Rosa	$40,000	25	6th Final day
2	(France) Guillaume Matignon	$20,000	20	
3	(Italy) Andrea Giarola	$15,000	16	Pro Tour debut
4	(United States) Noah Swartz	$13,000	16	
5	(United States) Josh Utter-Leyton	$11,000	12	
6	(United States) Brad Nelson	$10,500	12	
7	(Japan) Koutarou Ootsuka	$10,000	12	2nd Final day
8	(Australia) Jeremy Neeman	$9,500	12	

=== Pro Player of the year standings ===
Rank	Player	Pro Points
1	(Brazil) Paulo Vitor Damo da Rosa	37
2	(Germany) Simon Görtzen	31
3	(United States) Kyle Boggemes	28
4	(United States) Luis Scott-Vargas	26
5	(United States) Brad Nelson	25
5	(Japan) Tomoharu Saitou	25
5	(United States) Adam Yurchick	25

== Grand Prixs – Sendai, Manila, Columbus, Gothenburg ==
GP Sendai (5–6 June)

- Format: Standard
- Attendance: 907
1. (United States) Brian Kibler
2. (Japan) Makihito Mihara
3. (Japan) Shouta Yasooka
4. (Japan) Motoaki Itou
5. (Japan) Takeshi Ozawa
6. (Japan) Yuuya Watanabe
7. (Japan) Hiroyuki Shimoya
8. (Japan) Ryou Tasaki

GP Gothenburg (28–29 August)

- Format: Limited
- Attendance: 1001
1. (Sweden) Kenny Öberg
2. (Sweden) Anton Jonsson
3. (Belgium) Marijn Lybaert
4. (Brazil) Allison Abe
5. (Norway) Nicolai Herzog
6. (Finland) Sami Häggkvist
7. (United States) Samuel Black
8. (Finland) Markku Rikola

GP Manila (12–13 June)

- Format: Standard
- Attendance: 1071
1. (Japan) Naoki Nakada
2. (Indonesia) Taufik Indrakesuma
3. (Philippines) Gerald Camangon
4. (Japan) Yuuya Watanabe
5. (China) Yuchen Liu
6. (Philippines) Adrian Marasigan
7. (Japan) Yuuta Takahashi
8. (Philippines) Bayani Manansala

GP Columbus (31 July–1 August)

- Format: Legacy
- Attendance: 1296
1. (Japan) Tomoharu Saitou
2. (United States) Tom Martell
3. (United States) Jason Ford
4. (United States) Caleb Durward
5. (United States) Bryant Cook
6. (United States) Chris Gosselin
7. (United States) Korey Age
8. (United States) Brad Nelson

== Pro Tour Amsterdam (3–5 September 2010) ==
The third Pro Tour of the season was held in Amsterdam Convention Factory in Amsterdam, Netherlands. The formats were Extended and Booster Draft with the Top 8 playing Extended again.

Brad Nelson finished in first place after the Swiss rounds, thus continuing his string of Top 8 appearances that he had started at GP Washington in May. Despite losing in the final with his green-white-black Doran-deck, the additional Pro Points were sufficient to make him the leader in the Pro Player of the Year race. Kai Budde had his tenth showing in a Pro Tour Top 8 after six years of absence. He had piloted his Gabriel Nassif-designed White Weenie-deck to a 9–0–1 performance in the Swiss portion of the tournament before losing to Nelson. The eventual winner of the tournament was American Paul Rietzl, playing a White Weenie deck similar to Budde's. Rietzl made a clean sweep of the Top 8 going 9-0, the first time this had ever been done at a Constructed Pro Tour.

=== Tournament data ===
Prize pool: $230,795
Players: 457
Format: Extended, Booster Draft
Head Judge: Toby Elliott

=== Top 8 ===
Quarter-finals
1	Brad Nelson	3
8	Kai Budde	2
4	Marijn Lybaert	3
5	Guillaume Wafo-Tapa	1
2	Paul Rietzl	3
7	Thomas Ma	0
3	Michael Jacob	3
6	Brian Kibler	2

Semi-finals
Brad Nelson	3
Marijn Lybaert	0
Paul Rietzl	3
Michael Jacob	0

Finals
Brad Nelson	0
Paul Rietzl	3

=== Final standings ===
Place	Player	Prize	Pro Points	Comment
1	(United States) Paul Rietzl	$40,000	25	2nd Final day
2	(United States) Brad Nelson	$20,000	20	2nd Final day
3	(United States) Michael Jacob	$15,000	16	
4	(Belgium) Marijn Lybaert	$13,000	16	4th Final day
5	(France) Guillaume Wafo-Tapa	$11,000	12	3rd Final day
6	(United States) Brian Kibler	$10,500	12	4th Final day
7	(United States) Thomas Ma	$10,000	12	Pro Tour debut
8	(Germany) Kai Budde	$9,500	12	10th Final day

=== Pro Player of the year standings ===
Rank	Player	Pro Points
1	(United States) Brad Nelson	54
2	(Japan) Tomoharu Saitou	44
3	(Brazil) Paulo Vitor Damo da Rosa	41
4	(France) Guillaume Matignon	38
5	(Germany) Simon Görtzen	37
5	(Belgium) Marijn Lybaert	37

== Grand Prixs – Portland, Sydney, Toronto, Bochum, Nashville, Florence ==
GP Portland (11–12 September)

- Format: Limited
- Attendance: 1371
1. (Czech Republic) Martin Juza
2. (United States) Thomas Kiene
3. (Canada) Josh Layne
4. (United States) Philip Bau
5. (United States) Jonathan Louks
6. (United States) Nicholas Lynn
7. (United States) David Ochoa
8. (Brazil) Paulo Vitor Damo da Rosa

GP Bochum (30–31 October)

- Format: Limited
- Attendance: 1814
1. (Czech Republic) Martin Juza
2. (Switzerland) Yves Sele
3. (France) Julien Perez
4. (Netherlands) Geertjan Woltjes
5. (Germany) Manuel Mayer
6. (Germany) Jonas Köstler
7. (Germany) Sok-yong Lee
8. (Switzerland) Matthias Künzler

GP Sydney (9–10 October)

- Format: Limited
- Attendance: 434
1. (Australia) Jeremy Neeman
2. (United States) Luis Scott-Vargas
3. (Australia) Jacky Zhang
4. (Australia) Isaac Egan
5. (Japan) Yuuya Watanabe
6. (Australia) Michael Dao
7. (Australia) Jarron Puszet
8. (Japan) Masayasu Tanahashi

GP Nashville (20–21 November)

- Format: Limited
- Attendance: 1481
1. (United States) Gerry Thompson
2. (United States) Ari Lax
3. (United States) Gerard Fabiano
4. (United States) John Kolos
5. (United States) Josh Utter-Leyton
6. (United States) Conley Woods
7. (Czech Republic) Martin Juza
8. (United States) Kyle Stoll

GP Toronto (23–24 October)

- Format: Limited
- Attendance: 1361
1. (Canada) Jonathan Smithers
2. (United States) Brad Nelson
3. (United States) Dustin Faeder
4. (United States) Ben Stark
5. (United States) Eric Froehlich
6. (United States) David Howard
7. (United States) Pat Cox
8. (United States) Stephen Zhang

GP Florence (27–28 November)

- Format: Limited
- Attendance: 1291
1. (Italy) Pierluigi Aceto
2. (Italy) Nicola Landoni
3. (Japan) Shuhei Nakamura
4. (Italy) Citino Guido
5. (Italy) Mario Pascoli
6. (Switzerland) Tommi Lindgren
7. (Sweden) Anders Melin
8. (Germany) Jörg Unfried

== 2010 World Championships – Chiba (9–12 December 2010) ==
The 17th Magic World Championships was held in Makuhari Messe in Chiba, Japan. The tournament was won by Guillaume Matignon beating long-time friend and colleague Guillaume Wafo-Tapa in the final. In the team event, Slovakia defeated Australia in the finals.

=== Tournament data ===
Prize pool: $245,245 (individual) + ? (teams)
Players: 352 (57 National Teams)
Formats: Standard, Booster Draft, Extended
Team Formats: Standard, Extended, Legacy
Head Judge: Riccardo Tessitori

=== Top 8 ===
Quarter-finals
1	Paulo Vitor Damo da Rosa	3
8	Jonathan Randle	2
4	Guillaume Matignon	3
5	Eric Froelich	1
2	Love Janse	3
7	Christopher Wolf	2
3	Guillaume Wafo-Tapa	3
6	Lukas Jaklovsky	1

Semi-finals
1	Paulo Vitor Damo da Rosa	0
4	Guillaume Matignon	3
2	Love Janse	1
3	Guillaume Wafo-Tapa	3

Finals
Guillaume Matignon	3
Guillaume Wafo-Tapa	1

=== Final standings ===
Place	Player	Prize	Pro Points	Comment
1	(France) Guillaume Matignon	$45,000	25	2nd Final day
2	(France) Guillaume Wafo-Tapa	$24,000	20	4th Final day
3	(Brazil) Paulo Vitor Damo da Rosa	$15,000	16	7th Final day
4	(Sweden) Love Janse	$14,000	16	Pro Tour Debut
5	(United States) Eric Froehlich	$11,000	12	2nd Final day
6	(Czech Republic) Lukas Jaklovsky	$10,500	12	
7	(Austria) Christopher Wolf	$10,000	12	
8	(England) Jonathan Randle	$9,500	12	

=== Team competition ===
1. Slovakia — Ivan Floch, Robert Jurkovic, Patrik Surab
2. Australia — Adam Witton, Ian Wood, Jeremy Neeman

== Pro Player of the Year final standings ==
For the first time in Pro Tour history, there was a tie for Pro Player of the Year. The tie players, Brad Nelson and Guillaume Matignon, played a single match play-off at Pro Tour Paris 2011 to determine the winner of the 2010 Pro Player of the Year title. Brad Nelson would win the match 4-2 to claim the 2010 Player of the Year title.

Rank	Player	Pro Points
1	(United States) Brad Nelson	66
1	(France) Guillaume Matignon	66
3	(Brazil) Paulo Vitor Damo da Rosa	64
4	(Czech Republic) Martin Juza	52
5	(Japan) Shuhei Nakamura	51
5	(France) Guillaume Wafo-Tapa	51
7	(United States) Luis Scott-Vargas	47
8	(Japan) Yuuya Watanabe	45

== Performance by country ==
The United States had the most Top 8 appearances at twelve, but they also had by far the most players playing in the Pro Tour. With 26 they also have the most Pro Club Level 4+ professional players. Compared to the previous season, the United States put 2 more players into Top 8s (+20%) and generated 9 additional "gravy trainers" (+53%). Japan's performance at the top fell sharply, putting 4 players less amongst the Top 8s (-67%) and also generating 8 level 4+ pros less than in the preceding season (-47%). Meanwhile, France had the second most Top 8 appearances at 4 after a single Top 8 in 2009.

Country	T8	Q	Q/T8	M	GT	Best Player (PPts)
United States	12	468	39	210	26	Brad Nelson (66)
France	4	87	22	191	6	Guillaume Matignon (66)
Germany	3	84	28	202.5	6	Simon Görtzen (40)
Japan	2	160	80	160.5	9	Shuhei Nakamura (51)
Belgium	2	42	21	168.5	3	Marijn Lybaert (43)
Brazil	2	33	17	276	1	Paulo Vitor Damo da Rosa (64)
Czech Republic	1	38	38	127	5	Martin Juza (52)
(Netherlands) Nethlands	1	53	53	172	2	Bas Melis (25)
Italy	1	64	64	197	2	Andrea Giarola (26)

T8 = Number of players from that country appearing in a Pro Tour Top 8; Q = Number of players from that country participating in Pro Tours; M = Median finish over all PTs; GT = Gravy Trainers (a.k.a. players with a Pro Players Club level of 4 or more) from that country created in the 2010 season; Best Player (PPts) = Player with the most Pro Points from that country, Pro Points of that player in brackets.
