= Guillaume Wafo-Tapa =

French Magic: The Gathering player

- Nationality: French
- Pro Tour debut: Pro Tour Barcelona 2001
- Winnings: $173,800
- Pro Tour wins (Top 8): 1 (5)
- Grand Prix wins (Top 8): 0 (7)
- Lifetime Pro Points: 262
- Planeswalker Level: 48 (Archmage)

Guillaume Wafo-Tapa is a French Magic: The Gathering player. Best known for winning Pro Tour Yokohama in 2007, Wafo-Tapa's career has featured three other Pro Tour top eights, and six Grand Prix top eights. He is also known as a deck designer and for his strong preference for control decks. In 2014, Wafo-Tapa was voted into the Magic: The Gathering Hall of Fame.

== Career ==
Beginning his Pro Tour career in 2001 at Pro Tour Barcelona, Wafo-Tapa first came to prominence not for his playing abilities but for his deck design. In collaboration with Guillaume Matignon, he designed the deck used by Pierre Canali to win Pro Tour Columbus in 2005. The following season, he had his first strong finish on the Pro Tour. Playing a deck that would later be known as Wafo-Tapa control, he finished 12th at Pro Tour Honolulu, missing the top eight on tie-breakers. Wafo-Tapa would play every Pro Tour that season, and earn enough points to qualify him for every event the following season. His standard deck from the World Championship, Dralnu du Louvre, became one of the defining decks in standard over the following months.

The 2007 season was Wafo-Tapa's break-out year. Following a top sixteen finish in Geneva, he made the top eight of Pro Tour Yokohama, joining a group that featured Hall of Fame member Raphaël Lévy, Japanese star-player Masashi Oiso, and players like Mark Herberholz, and Tomoharu Saito who had both won Pro Tours in the previous season. Defeating Paulo Carvalho and both Pro Tour Honolulu champions (Mark Herberholz, 2006, and Kazuya Mitamura, 2009), Wafo-Tapa won the tournament. With a 14th-place finish at Pro Tour Valencia, a 22nd-place finish at the World Championships, and an unremarkable 123rd place at Pro Tour San Diego, Wafo-Tapa finished third in the player of the year race.

To begin the 2008 season, he reached the top eight of a Pro Tour a second time. The Pro Tour Kuala Lumpur top eight featured three other Pro Tour Champions, including Hall of Famers Jon Finkel and Nicolai Herzog. Wafo-Tapa lost his quarterfinal match to Jon Finkel, the eventual champion, without winning a single game. Wafo-Tapa's success continued through the next event, finishing 13th at Pro Tour Hollywood. Quick 'n' Toast, the deck he designed for the event, also became one of the format defining decks. The rest of the 2008 season was not very remarkable, with Wafo-Tapa finishing below 200th place at both the remaining Pro Tours. This trend continued through the 2009 season. He earned only ten Pro Points that year and lost his standing invitation to the Pro Tour. This did little to deter Wafo-Tapa, who went so far as to tell coverage reporter Rich Hagon that "It will be fine".

This prediction turned out to be true. While his finishes at Pro Tours San Diego and San Juan, were rather unimpressive, he made back to back top eights at Pro Tour Amsterdam and the World Championship. Once again, Wafo-Tapa's fellow top eight competitors in Amsterdam featured multiple winners in the form of Brian Kibler, and the German Juggernaut, Kai Budde. Wafo-Tapa lost in the quarterfinals a second time, to Belgian Marijn Lybaert. At the 2010 World Championship, he made it all the way to the finals before losing to long-time friend and colleague, Guillaume Matignon.

On April 28, 2011, Wizards of the Coast announced that Guillaume Wafo-Tapa was suspended for a year and a half, until October 2012, following a confession of his involvement in the spoiling of the New Phyrexia "God Book" several weeks before Wizards of the Coast was due to commence its spoiler season. The so-called "God Book" contained a spoiler of the entire set. Wafo–Tapa's teammate 2010 Magic World Champion Guillaume Matignon received the "God Book" so that he could write an article for the French magazine Lotus Noir about the upcoming release.

=== Achievements ===
| Season | Event type | Location | Format | Date | Rank |
|---|---|---|---|---|---|
| 2006 | Grand Prix | Turin | Sealed and Booster Draft | 3–4 June 2006 | 6 |
| 2006 | Grand Prix | Athens | Sealed and Booster Draft | 14–15 October 2006 | 4 |
| 2007 | Pro Tour | Yokohama | Block Constructed | 20–22 April 2007 | 1 |
| 2007 | Grand Prix | Montreal | Block Constructed | 23–24 June 2007 | 3 |
| 2007 | Grand Prix | Krakow | Standard | 3–4 November 2007 | 7 |
| 2008 | Pro Tour | Kuala Lumpur | Booster Draft | 15–17 February 2008 | 5 |
| 2008 | Grand Prix | Copenhagen | Standard | 23–24 August 2008 | 5 |
| 2008 | Grand Prix | Okayama | Sealed and Booster Draft | 22–23 November 2008 | 8 |
| 2010 | Pro Tour | Amsterdam | Extended and Booster Draft | 3–5 September 2010 | 5 |
| 2010 | Worlds | Chiba, Chiba | Special | 9–12 December 2010 | 2 |
| 2011 | Grand Prix | Barcelona | Standard | 26–27 March 2011 | 7 |
| 2013–14 | Pro Tour | Dublin | Standard and Booster Draft | 11–13 October 2013 | 5 |
| 2017–18 | Grand Prix | Brussels | Standard | 11–12 August 2018 | 7 |

Last updated: 13 August 2018
Source: Wizards.com

== World of Warcraft TCG ==
Guillaume Wafo-Tapa has also had some success playing other trading card games. Wafo-Tapa took part in the World of Warcraft TCG 2011 World Cup, a national team event, playing alongside fellow Frenchmen Raphael Ait Slimane and Laurent Pagorek in a team called 'B-B-B'. The team would make it all the way to the finals of the tournament where they were defeated by an American team called 'The Warriors', consisting of Ben Isgur, Matt Markoff and James Kandziolka.
