= Bram Snepvangers =

Dutch Magic: The Gathering player (born 1976)

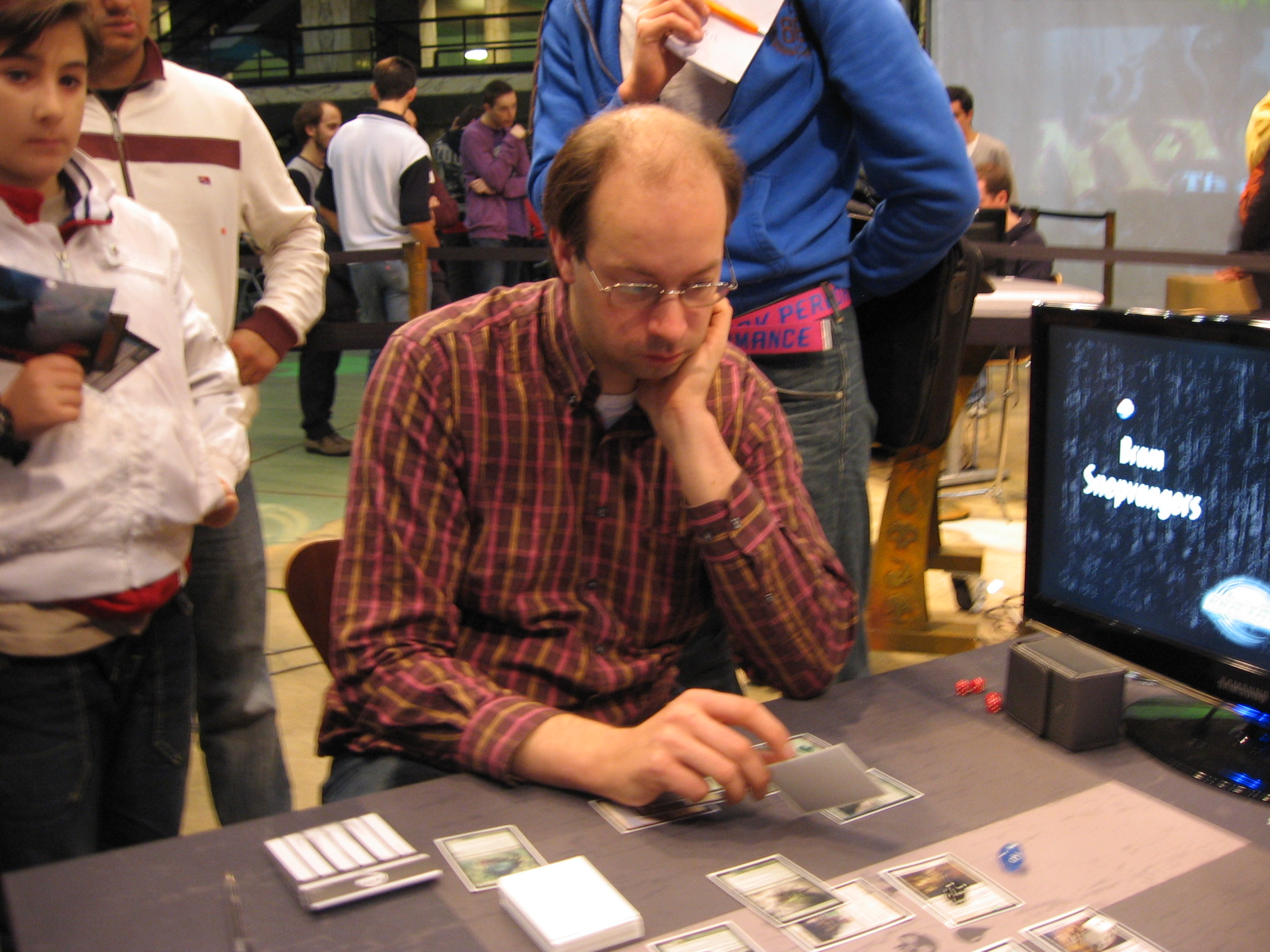
- Born: 25 April 1976 (age 50)
- Nationality: (Netherlands) Dutch
- Pro Tour debut: Worlds 1997
- Winnings: US$118,570
- Pro Tour wins (Top 8): 0 (4)
- Grand Prix wins (Top 8): 0 (8)
- Median Pro Tour Finish: 139
- Lifetime Pro Points: 317
- Planeswalker Level: 50 (Archmage)

Bram Snepvangers (born 1976) is a Dutch Magic: The Gathering player. He is now considered retired, but has been on and off the Pro Tour for twelve years. In addition to his success playing Magic, he is known as a community builder both as a judge and a tournament organiser. Each year he hosts an invitational tournament for Dutch players called Bramvitational. Along with Willam "Huey" Jensen and Brad Nelson, Snepvangers is one of only three players to have eliminated Kai Budde in the knock-rounds of a Pro Tour. He qualified for every Pro Tour event held in the decade of the 2000s, and participated in all but one of them. He is second only to Raphaël Lévy on the list of players with the most Pro Tour appearances.

In 2010, Snepvangers was voted into the Hall of Fame, alongside Gabriel Nassif and Brian Kibler. The Dutchman passed the 40% threshold necessary to become a Hall of Famer by a single vote. Snepvangers was not originally announced as an inductee, but it was later discovered that Wizards of the Coast had not used the proper formula to calculate his voting total.

== Achievements ==
Season	Event type	Location	Format	Date	Rank
1998–99	Grand Prix	Amsterdam	Limited	15–16 May 1999	5
1999–00	Grand Prix	Cannes	Team Limited	26–27 February 2000	2
2000–01	Grand Prix	Florence	Extended	25–26 November 2000	2
2000–01	Grand Prix	Turin	Team Limited	26–27 May 2001	3
2001–02	Pro Tour	Nice	Extended	2–5 May 2002	2
2001–02	Grand Prix	London	Block Constructed	31 August–1 September 2002	3
2002–03	Pro Tour	Chicago	Rochester Draft	17–19 January 2003	7
2006	Grand Prix	Cardiff	Sealed and Booster Draft	25–26 March 2006	6
2006	Grand Prix	Turin	Sealed and Booster Draft	3–4 June 2006	3
2006	Pro Tour	Kobe	Booster Draft	20–20 October 2006	6
2009	Worlds	Rome	Special	19–22 November 2009	4
2010	Grand Prix	Lyon	Sealed and Booster Draft	8–9 May 2010	4

Last updated: 10 May 2010
Source: Wizards.com

- Hall of Fame class of 2010
