= Kuo Tzu-Ching =

Taiwanese Magic: The Gathering player (born 1981)

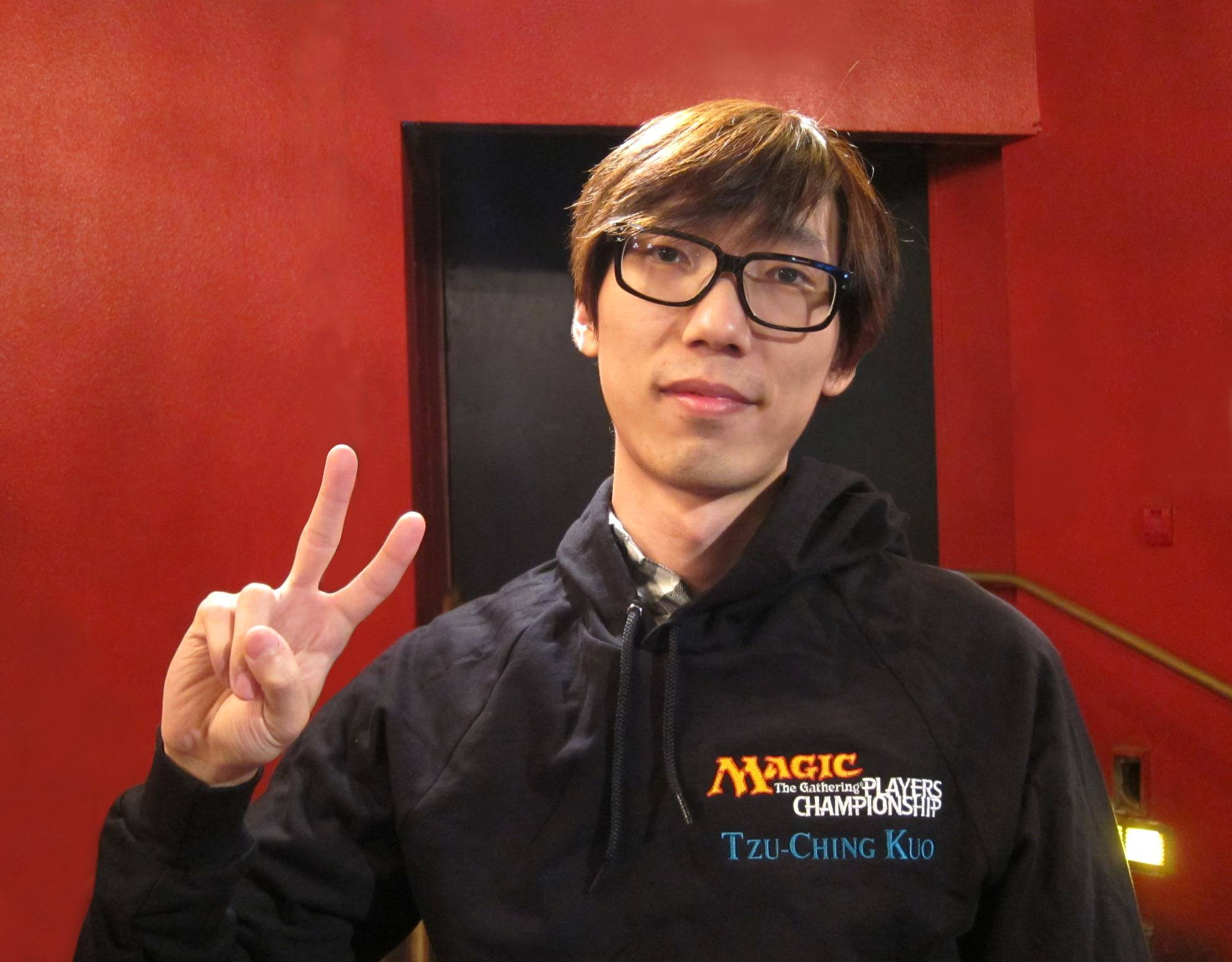
- Kuo at the 2012 Magic Players Championship.
- Born: 29 April 1981 (age 44); Taipei, Taiwan
- Winnings: $76,225
- Grand Prix wins (Top 8): 0 (11)
- Lifetime Pro Points: 252
- Planeswalker Level: 50 (Archmage)

Kuo Tzu-Ching 郭子敬 (born April 29, 1981 in Taipei, Taiwan) is a Taiwanese professional Magic: The Gathering player. Kuo is considered to be one of the best players in the Asia Pacific Region.

Kuo debuted at Pro Tour New York in 2000. Throughout his career, he has made the Top eight of 11 Grand Prix events. Kuo's lifetime winnings amount to $76,225, and he has also accumulated 252 lifetime Professional Points, putting him within the Top 50 in the world, and first in Asia Pacific.

In 2012, he became the World Champion at the very first World Magic Cup, alongside teammates Cheng Tung-Yi, Ivas Yang Yu Min and Paul Renie. In addition, he has made the Top 8 of Nationals eight times, been crowned National Champion five times and has five National Team appearances.

Kuo's highest Pro Tour finish is 10th, achieved during Pro Tour Avacyn Restored in Barcelona in 2012, a season that saw him achieve Platinum status, making him the first player in the Asia Pacific region to do so. He was invited to play in the exclusive 16-man Magic Players Championship 2012 as the Asia Pacific representative. In 2015, Kuo founded Game Square in Taipei, Taiwan, and it has since grown into one of Taiwan's first WPN Premier Stores.

== Accomplishments ==
Season	Event type	Location	Format	Date	Rank
1999–00	Grand Prix	Taipei	Extended	12–13 February 2000	6
2000–01	Grand Prix	Kaohsiung	Limited	10–11 February 2001	2
2000–01	Nationals	Taipei	Special	12–13 May 2001	6
2000–01	Grand Prix	Taipei	Team Limited	21–22 July 2001	3
2000–01	Grand Prix	Singapore	Extended	8–10 December 2001	3
2001–02	Nationals	Taipei	Special	11–12 May 2002	1
2003–04	Nationals	Taipei	Special	1–2 May 2004	7
2005	Nationals	Taipei	Special	10–11 September 2005	2
2006	Nationals	Taipei	Special	16–17 September 2006	7
2009	Grand Prix	Singapore	Extended	21–22 March 2009	8
2009	Grand Prix	Kobe	Extended	18–19 April 2009	3
2009	Nationals	Taipei	Special	4–5 July 2009	1
2010	Grand Prix	Yokohama	Extended	20–21 March 2010	5
2010	Nationals	Taipei	Special	18–19 September 2010	1
2011	Nationals	Taipei	Special	17–18 September 2011	3
2011	Worlds	San Francisco	National team	17–20 November 2011	4
2012	Grand Prix	Kuala Lumpur	Standard	24–25 March 2012	6
2012	World Magic Cup	Indianapolis	Special	17–19 August 2012	1
2012–13	Grand Prix	Quebec City	Standard	22–24 February 2013	2
2012–13	Grand Prix	Kitakyushu	Standard	23–25 August 2013	3
2014–15	Grand Prix	Manila	Standard	3–4 January 2015	2

Last updated: 7 March 2014
Source: Wizards.com

Preceded by Unknown	Magic Chinese Taipei National Champion; 2002	Succeeded by Chang Chih Hsiang
Preceded by Wang Ming Chee	Magic Chinese Taipei National Champion; 2009–2010	Succeeded by Chun Bo-ruad
Preceded by Chun Bo-ruad	Magic Chinese Taipei National Champion; 2012–2014	Succeeded by Huang Hao-shan
Preceded by (Japan) Japan; Ryuichiro Ishida; Tomoya Fujimoto; Makihito Mihara	Magic: The Gathering Team World Champion; With: Cheng Tung-yi; Yang Yu-min; Paul Renie; 2012	Succeeded by (France) France; Raphaël Lévy; Timothée Simonot; Yann Guthmann; Stephane Soubrier
