= Guillaume Matignon =

French Magic: The Gathering player

- Nickname: The Unstoppable
- Born: Bordeaux, France
- Pro Tour wins (Top 8): 1 (2)
- Lifetime Pro Points: 115
- Planeswalker Level: 45 (Battlemage)

Guillaume Matignon is a professional trading card game player from Bordeaux, France. He has earned numerous accolades during his career including the World of Warcraft TCG 2007 World Championship and the Magic: The Gathering 2010 World Championship.

== Magic: The Gathering ==
Guillaume Matignon started playing Magic: The Gathering in 1994. Guillaume claims to have received the 34th DCI number issued in France and to have played in France's very first sanctioned event.

In 2002, Matignon would meet fellow French player Guillaume Wafo-Tapa at the European Championship. Later that year Matignon moved to Wafo-Tapa's hometown of Nantes to study for three years. From there the two built a strong friendship, often preparing for events together. Matignon credits this friendship as a major source of his later personal success and considers Wafo-Tapa to be his favorite player.

Matignon's name first came to the attention of the Magic: The Gathering community as one of the men credited with designing Pierre Canali's Affinity deck, which he used to win Pro Tour Columbus 2005. In particular, Matignon was credited with the addition of Meddling Mage to the deck, a card Canali said 'made all the difference'. At this point, Matignon had not met Canali, with Wafo-Tapa being the one to pass the decklist on to Canali.

Matignon's breakout performance came at the 2006 France National Championship where he made the Top 8, losing to Selim Creiche in the quarterfinals. Matignon claims that this result made him more serious about Magic and he started to attend every Pro Tour. Matignon would continue to have great success at the France National Championships going on to win the 2007 event, take 3rd place in the 2009 event, and take 2nd in the 2010 event. The French National teams that Guillaume has featured on in the Team World Championship have placed 43rd (2007), 8th (2009) and 6th (2010).

=== 2010 Player of the Year Race ===
Matignon's greatest success came in 2010, in which he reached the finals of Pro Tour San Juan, and won the 2010 World Championship defeating long-time friend Guillaume Wafo-Tapa in the finals. These results combined with his 2nd place French Nationals finish and other strong finishes throughout the year resulted in Matignon coming in joint first place alongside Brad Nelson in the 2010 Player of the Year race. This led to an unprecedented Pro Player of the Year tie-breaker contest. The 2010 Player of the Year race was decided in a special Player of the Year Match held at Pro Tour Paris 2011. Brad Nelson won the match 4-2 and became the official 2010 Pro Player of the Year, leaving Matignon to take second place.

=== Suspension ===
On 28 April 2011, the Magic: The Gathering website reported that Guillaume Matignon and fellow professional Magic: The Gathering player Guillaume Wafo-Tapa, had admitted responsibility for the leak of all the cards that would be contained in the upcoming New Phyrexia set. Matignon was apologetic about the leak, revealing that it was caused when he shared the 'God Book' of all the cards in the set, which he had received in order to write an article on the set for French magazine Lotus Noir, with Wafo-Tapa. As a result, Guillaume Matignon was suspended from the DCI for three years, but later reduced to one year. Guillaume Wafo-Tapa, Martial Moreau, and David Gauthier (the three other players involved in the leak) were also suspended until October 2012.

=== Accomplishments ===
Season	Event type	Location	Format	Date	Rank
2006	Nationals	Aix-en-Provence	Special	22–23 July 2006	5
2007	Nationals	Tours	Special	14–15 July 2007	1
2009	Nationals	Aix-en-Provence	Standard and Booster Draft	25–26 July 2009	3
2010	Pro Tour	San Juan	Block Constructed and Booster Draft	28–29 May 2010	2
2010	Nationals	Reims	Standard and Booster Draft	24–25 July 2010	2
2010	Worlds	Chiba	Special	9–12 December 2010	1
2017	Pro Tour	Albuquerque	Standard and Booster Draft	3-5 November 2017	8

Last updated: 5 September 2011
Source: Event Coverage at Wizards.com

== World of Warcraft TCG ==
Guillaume Matignon took part in the first ever World of Warcraft TCG World Championships in 2007. The event took place from 30 November to 2 December in San Diego, California and featured over 400 participants. Matignon would go on to win the event becoming the inaugural World Champion and earning himself $100,000, the largest single prize in TCG history. As a result of this achievement, Guillaume Matignon is the current holder of the World Record for the 'Greatest Cash Prize for a Trading Card Game'.

Before winning the World Championships of WOW TCG, Guillaume also won the National Championship in 2007.

Preceded by N/A	World of Warcraft TCG World Champion; 2007	Succeeded by (United States) Jim Fleckenstein
Preceded by Sylvain Lauriol	Magic: The Gathering French National Champion; 2007	Succeeded by Christophe Peyronnel
Preceded by (Portugal) André Coimbra	Magic: The Gathering World Championship; 2010	Succeeded by (Japan) Jun'ya Iyanaga
