= Marijn Lybaert =

Belgian Magic: The Gathering player

- Pro Tour debut: 2003 Pro Tour Boston
- Winnings: $91,250
- Pro Tour wins (Top 8): 0 (4)
- Grand Prix wins (Top 8): 0 (3)
- Lifetime Pro Points: 202
- Planeswalker Level: 49 (Archmage)

Marijn Lybaert is a Belgian professional Magic: The Gathering player. With four Pro Tour top eight finishes and over 200 lifetime Pro Points, he has been one of the most successful Belgians on Tour.

== Achievements ==
Season	Event type	Location	Format	Date	Rank
2006	Grand Prix	Toulouse	Sealed and Booster Draft	24–25 June 2006	2
2007	Pro Tour	Geneva	Booster Draft	9–11 February 2007	5
2008	Pro Tour	Hollywood	Block Constructed	23–25 March 2008	6
2009	Worlds	Rome	Special	19–22 November 2009	7
2010	Grand Prix	Gothenburg	Sealed and Booster Draft	28–29 August 2010	3
2010	Pro Tour	Amsterdam	Extended and Booster Draft	3–5 September 2010	4
2012	Grand Prix	Manchester	Sealed and Booster Draft	21–22 April 2012	6
2013–14	World Magic Cup	Amsterdam	National team	2–4 August 2013	8

Last updated: 18 March 2014
Source: Wizards.com
