= SolForge =

Free-to-play card game

- Developer: Stone Blade Entertainment
- Publisher: Stone Blade Entertainment
- Designers: Brian Kibler, Jeff Liu, Gary Arant, John Fiorillo, Richard Garfield
- Platforms: Android, iOS, Linux, MacOS, Microsoft Windows
- Release: May 31, 2016
- Genre: Collectible card game
- Mode: Multiplayer; single-player

SolForge was a free-to-play digital collectible card game by Stone Blade Entertainment. The design team included Magic: The Gathering designer Richard Garfield and Pro Tour hall of famer Brian Kibler. The game was released in May 2016 following three years in early access. In January 2017, Stone Blade announced that the game would be shutting down that month, however, an agreement was later reached with two executives from Grinding Gear Games, but not the studio directly, keeping the game online.

The game's servers were still online in 2018, however, updates to the official client ceased so the fan community developed an unofficial client to address bugs and add features called ReForged (formerly KUSC). It had an Android and iOS version that could play matches with players using the official client. In December 2018, it was announced that Stone Blade had asked for the unofficial client to be shut down, and in January 2019 both the official server and the unofficial client were discontinued.

== Development ==
SolForge was part funded through a Kickstarter crowdfunding campaign, raising $429,715 towards its development in September 2012. According to Stone Blade CEO Justin Gary, the game ended up costing over five times this amount to develop.

== Gameplay ==
SolForge is a competitive two-player turn-based strategy game. Each player begins with a deck of cards and 120 health points, they must play these cards and reduce the opponent's health zero to win the game. Players can play two cards per turn, each card may be played in one of five lanes. Cards deal damage to the opponent's card in its respective lane. If there is no opponent card in the lane, the damage is dealt directly to the opponent. Once a card is played, it is replaced by a more powerful variant of the card (upgrade) up to a maximum level. Other copies of that card in the player's deck are not affected.

== Reception ==
Ben Barrett, writing in Rock, Paper, Shotgun, found the game had the "addictive nature synonymous with the genre", and found himself logging in almost daily to play. He was frustrated however by the business model, and the lack of a secondary market for cards, which he felt gave the game a "slight 'pay-to-win' feel".
