= Brad Nelson (gamer) =

American Magic: The Gathering player

- Nickname: FFfreaK
- Born: Fargo, North Dakota
- Nationality: (United States) American
- Pro Tour debut: 2009 Pro Tour Honolulu
- Winnings: US$186,480
- Pro Tour wins (Top 8): 0 (3)
- Grand Prix wins (Top 8): 2 (13)
- Median Pro Tour Finish: 57
- Lifetime Pro Points: 386
- Planeswalker Level: 50 (Archmage)

Brad Nelson is an American Magic: The Gathering player. Also known by his Magic: The Gathering Online name, FFfreaK, he has three Pro Tour top eights, and thirteen Grand Prix top eights, including two wins. In 2010, Nelson became the first non-Japanese player since Gabriel Nassif in 2004 and the first American player since Bob Maher in 2000 to earn the Player of the Year title. However, Nelson did not receive his title for Player of the Year 2010 until February 2011 after winning the first-ever Player of the Year Tie playoff match against Guillaume Matignon of France.

== Magic: The Gathering ==
Brad Nelson starting playing Magic: The Gathering in high school, when his best friend William Lies introduced the game to him. Nelson first came to prominence on Magic: The Gathering Online under the screen name FFfreak, a name inspired by his love for the Final Fantasy series of videogames. Whilst Brad was attempting to make it on to the Pro Tour he developed a friendship with 2005 Player of the Year Kenji Tsumura, who would send him his decks to help Brad win a Pro Tour Qualifier. Brad considers Kenji to be his favorite player of all time.

Brad made his Pro Tour debut at Pro Tour Honolulu in 2009, managing to come in 9th place. Brad would also make his first Grand Prix Top 8 at Grand Prix Minneapolis that year. Brad would go on to further success on the Pro Tour in the 2010 season. Brad made his first Pro Tour Top 8 at Pro Tour San Juan, though was defeated in the quarterfinals by Guillaume Matignon. At Pro Tour Amsterdam, Brad made his second Pro Tour Top 8 of the year. In the quarterfinals, he became one of only three players to have beaten Kai Budde in the elimination rounds of a Pro Tour. Brad would go on to make the finals of the tournament, losing to Paul Rietzl to take second place. After his performance in Amsterdam, Brad would become the front-runner in the Player of the Year standings. Brad had a 15-point lead going into the final event of the year, the 2010 World Championship. However, Nelson would come in 135th place at Worlds only adding 3 additional points to his overall total. This allowed the 2010 World Champion Guillaume Matignon to earn enough points with his victory to equal Brad's total for an unprecedented Player of the Year tie. The Pro Player of the Year title was decided in a special Player of the Match between Nelson and Matignon at Pro Tour Paris 2011. Nelson won the match 4-2 to claim the 2010 Player of the Year title, becoming the first American to win the title in ten years.

In the 2011 season, Brad had a disappointing year, failing to Top 8 any major events. Discussing his year in an interview with Tristan Shaun Gregson, Brad blamed a loss of confidence for his disappointing performance.

=== Achievements ===
Season	Event type	Location	Format	Date	Rank
2009	Nationals	Kansas City, Missouri	Standard and Booster Draft	July 22–24, 2009	4
2009	Grand Prix	Minneapolis	Sealed and Booster Draft	November 14, 2009	4
2010	Grand Prix	Washington D.C.	Standard	May 22–23, 2010	1
2010	Pro Tour	San Juan, Puerto Rico	Block Constructed and Booster Draft	May 28–30, 2010	6
2010	Grand Prix	Columbus	Legacy	July 31–August 1, 2010	8
2010	Nationals	Minneapolis	Standard and Booster Draft	August 19–22, 2010	8
2010	Pro Tour	Amsterdam	Extended and Booster Draft	September 3–5, 2010	2
2010	Grand Prix	Toronto	Sealed and Booster Draft	October 23–24, 2010	2
2012–13	Grand Prix	Minneapolis	Standard	May 19–20, 2012	2
2012–13	Grand Prix	Atlantic City	Standard	January 12–13, 2013	3
2013–14	Grand Prix	Miami	Standard	June 29–30, 2013	3
2013–14	Grand Prix	Louisville	Standard	October 19–20, 2013	6
2013–14	Grand Prix	Cincinnati	Standard	March 22–23, 2014	2
2014–15	Grand Prix	Los Angeles	Standard	October 18–19, 2014	6
2014–15	Grand Prix	Memphis	Standard	February 21–22, 2015	3
2014–15	Grand Prix	Toronto	Standard	May 2–3, 2015	4
2015–16	Pro Tour	Madrid	Standard and Booster Draft	April 22–24, 2016	6
2016–17	Grand Prix	Omaha	Standard	June 2–4, 2017	1

Last updated: May 8, 2015
Source: wizards.com

Other accomplishments

- Pro Tour Player of the Year 2010
- Brad was one of twelve players to be invited to play in the 2010 Magic Online World Championship. Brad finished in fourth place overall.
- Brad represented the Magic Online Community in the 2010 Magic Online Community Cup.
- Brad won the first StarCityGames Players Championship (2014)

== Media ==
After winning the Pro Player of the Year title, Richard Hagon wrote a biographical book entitled Grinder: The Brad Nelson Story about Nelson's road to becoming the Pro Player of the Year.

== Personal life ==
Brad Nelson is also the half-brother of Corey Baumeister, a fellow Magic: The Gathering player and three-time North Dakota State Champion. Currently, Brad works for Star City Games in Virginia as an article writer and participates in various video content for the site; which includes various videos of him testing and playing decks against fellow Star City Games pro players like Todd Anderson and Gerry Thompson, and their show "Above the Curve", which is a weekly half-hour show that goes over happenings and news in the competitive Magic scene.

Preceded by (Japan) Yuuya Watanabe	Pro Player of the Year; 2010	Succeeded by (United States) Owen Turtenwald
