= World of Warcraft Trading Card Game =

Collectible card game

World of Warcraft
Trading Card Game
- Cardback to the World of Warcraft TCG.
- Designers: Mike Hummel; Brian Kibler; Danny Mandel
- Publishers: Upper Deck Company (October 2005 – March 2010); Cryptozoic (March 2010 – August 2013)
- Publication: April 2004; 22 years ago
- Players: 2 +
- Setup time: < 3 minutes
- Playing time: > 20 minutes
- Skills: Card playing Arithmetic; Strategy

The World of Warcraft Trading Card Game (WoW TCG) is an out-of-print collectible card game based on Blizzard Entertainment's MMORPG, World of Warcraft. The game was announced by Upper Deck Entertainment on August 18, 2005 and released on October 25, 2006. Players can play against each other one-on-one, or can join others in order to defeat dungeon/raid "bosses" based on those in the MMORPG. In March 2010, Upper Deck lost the license from Blizzard Entertainment. The license was acquired by Cryptozoic Entertainment later in the month, with the company announcing that planned card sets would be released.

On August 23, 2013, Blizzard Entertainment announced that the TCG would be discontinued, and that they would not be renewing the game's license. In March 2014, Blizzard released Hearthstone, an online collectible card game featuring many of the same characters, abilities and artwork.

== Game details ==
Each player uses a hero card and a deck consisting of allies and other supporting cards, such as weapons, abilities, armor, items and quests. Many cards include a trait icon, which limits what heroes can include the card in their decks. Some booster packs also contain legendary rares, or loot cards (i.e. special versions of normal cards) which contain a scratch-off code. This code can then be redeemed in the online game for a virtual prize. The prizes include special tabards, gimmick items, non-combat pets, and mounts.

During play, players start with a single hero. Once per turn, players can play any card from their hand as a resource, which enables the payment of additional cards to augment the hero's powers or add additional members to his or her party. Once brought into play by paying the appropriate cost, all cards (except abilities) remain until destroyed or removed from play. As in games such as Magic: The Gathering, the goal is to reduce the remaining health of the opposing hero to zero. Unlike Magic, combat attacks are always directed at individual heroes or allies, rather than simply declaring an attack with a number of creatures. Furthermore, damage done to characters accumulates between turns, making combat more expensive for both the attacker and defender.

=== Card types ===
The following types of cards are featured in the game:

Spectral Tiger loot card

- Hero – The character which a given player is playing as. Each hero has an amount of starting health, faction affiliation, race, class, specializations, and professions. The hero's traits determine what other cards can be included in the deck (e.g., Horde heroes can only have Horde allies). Lastly, each hero has a unique power which can be used once per game, after which the hero card is turned face down. Starting with Worldbreaker, Hero cards no longer have professions.
- Master Hero – Master Hero cards, when played, replace a player's hero with a new card. The original hero is removed from the game and any damage, abilities, equipment, tokens or attachments that were on the hero beforehand are brought onto the Master Hero. Master Heroes, unless specified otherwise, can use all equipment and abilities, but abilities on cards that look for specific types cannot be activated. Powers originally on heroes do not carry on to the Master Hero.
- Ability – Cards that cause some immediate impact to the game. Abilities can either be of the [Basic type], able to be played only during one's turn, or can be [Instant], able to be played at virtually any time.
- Ally – Other individuals and companions who assist and fight on behalf of the main hero. Most allies are affiliated with either the Horde or the Alliance; cards affiliated with the faction opposing the hero are not permitted in a deck. Neutral allies can be included in a deck of either faction. Allies can attack opposing heroes or allies, but can also be attacked.
- Armor – Defensive cards which protect heroes from damage. By paying the appropriate resource cost, armor can be exhausted each turn in order to reduce damage dealt to a player's hero. Players are limited in how many different pieces of armor they may equip on any given "body part" (e.g., only one piece of chest armor at a time).
- Weapon – Offensive cards which can augment a hero's melee or ranged capabilities. As with armor cards, players are limited on how many weapons they may have equipped at once. In order to use a weapon card to increase attack power during combat, a player must pay a resource cost (Strike Cost) associated with the weapon. Weapons can be used when either attacking or defending, but usually only one weapon can be used per combat.
- Item – Gear the hero can have in addition to weapons and armor. Rings, potions, and trinkets are examples of items.
- Quest – Special cards which act as resource cards, but with additional abilities. Quests can be completed by fulfilling a condition described on the card. When this is done, a reward is earned (e.g., drawing additional cards) and the quest is normally turned face down.
- Location – Location cards are similar to quest cards, but are not turned face down to use their abilities. Only one location can be controlled at a time, even if locations have different names.
- Loot – Loot cards are special versions of cards which can be used within the card game (e.g. as normal allies), but which also contain a scratch-off code. This code can be entered into the website for the online game, which will provide a unique in-game item.

== Products ==
Twenty-one expansion sets (and one reprint set) were released for the WoW TCG. Cards were usually sold in booster packs, which contain 15 random cards – 10 commons, 3 uncommons, 1 rare or epic, and 1 hero card or loot card. Booster packs also had one UDE point card redeemable online. Starting with March of the Legion and ending with Twilight of the Dragons, booster packs contained 18 random cards due to more variation of card types: 2 extra commons and 1 extra uncommon. The color of the collector number printed on a card indicates its rarity, using a system similar to that of the online game: white for common, green for uncommon, blue for rare, purple for epic, and orange for legendary.

Certain sets also released with Starter Decks, containing a pre-constructed deck consisting of 33 fixed cards built around one of the 9 classes, 2 booster packs, 3 oversized hero cards and a rulebook. These decks contain 1 rare, 6 uncommons, and the rest are commons. Starter decks were released for Heroes of Azeroth, Through the Dark Portal, March of the Legion, and Drums of War. Class Decks and Champion Decks are other types of Starter Decks. The Battle Deck is a PvP variation of the Starter Deck that contains two pre-constructed decks consisting of 44 fixed cards, 3 oversized hero cards and 8 exclusive allies.

=== Sets released ===
- Heroes of Azeroth (released October 2006)
- Through the Dark Portal (released April 2007)
- Fires of Outland (released August 2007)
- March of the Legion (released December 2007)
- Servants of the Betrayer (released April 2008)
- The Hunt for Illidan (released July 2008)
- Drums of War (released November 2008)
- Blood of Gladiators (released March 2009)
- Fields of Honor (released June 2009)
- Scourgewar (released November 2009)
- Wrathgate (released May 2010)
- Archives (released August 2010 – foil reprints from Heroes of Azeroth to Fields of Honor)
- Icecrown (released September 2010)
- Worldbreaker (released December 2010)
- War of the Elements (released April 2011)
- Twilight of the Dragons (released July 2011)
- Aftermath: Throne of the Tides (released October 2011)
- Aftermath: Crown of the Heavens (released February 2012)
- Aftermath: Tomb of the Forgotten (released June 2012)
- Timewalkers: War of the Ancients (released October 2012)
- Timewalkers: Betrayal of the Guardian (released February 2013)
- Timewalkers: Reign of Fire (released July 2013)

=== Raid Decks ===
In addition to standard 2-player game play, the game also features Raid Decks, representing struggles involving large numbers of players against epic foes. Raid Decks are specially designed pre-constructed products used for a cooperative experience. They combine elements from the World of Warcraft (the team-based questing), and Dungeons & Dragons (the Raid Master). One player, the Raid Master controls all monsters and foes, while 3–5 other players control the characters participating in the raid.

A Raid Deck typically contains epic boss cards, decks for the boss characters, tokens to represent minions, custom rules for the raid, and a treasure pack, intended as a reward for players who are victorious in the raid. The treasure pack contains holofoils and sometimes contains a random insertion of a loot card. Upper Deck Entertainment also made treasure packs available from their UDE points store, although the cards in these packs are not holofoil.

Eight Raid Decks were released:

- Onyxia's Lair (December 2006) – Features the black dragon Onyxia.
- Molten Core (May 2007) – Includes ten epic bosses, from Lucifron to Ragnaros the Firelord.
- Magtheridon's Lair (January 2008) – Contains the Pit Lord Magtheridon, his shadow channelers, and the cubes required to interact with him.
- Black Temple (September 2008) – Based around Illidan Stormrage. Contains a 10 hero raid set with heroes such as Supremus and "The Betrayer".
- Naxxramas (December 2009) – An undead necropolis, seat of the lich Kel'Thuzad.
- Assault on Icecrown Citadel (March 2011) – Featuring the Lich King himself, with other bosses appearing as allies in his deck. Also includes 3 decks built around well-known heroes Lady Jaina Proudmoore, Lady Sylvanas Windrunner and Highlord Tirion Fordring.
- Battle of the Aspects (August 2012) – The final confrontation with Deathwing, the corrupted Aspect of Earth.
- The Caverns of Time (April 2013) – Take on iconic villains such as Archimonde the Defiler, Queen Azshara, and Murozond, leader of the Infinite Dragonflight.

=== Dungeon Decks ===
Similar to Raid Decks, Dungeon Decks are large scale encounters designed for multiple players to play against. The main difference from Raid Decks is that a Dungeon Deck runs itself with no need for an additional player to act as the Raid Master. Additionally Dungeon Decks are designed to be played against basic starter decks with players unlocking the ability to add new cards by gaining experience from defeating dungeons and leveling up.

Three Dungeon Decks were released in November 2011:

- Shadowfang Keep
- Scarlet Monastery
- The Deadmines

=== Bonus sets ===
Periodically, bonus card sets are released independently to mark special events or dates.

- Burning Crusade Set – A set of 3 cards to mark the release of World of Warcraft: The Burning Crusade. Two Heroes of Azeroth starter decks were included alongside the exclusive cards.
- Wrath of the Lich King Set – 2 exclusive cards were included in the Collector's Edition of WotLK with 2 March of the Legion starter decks.
- Cataclysm Set – 2 exclusive cards were included in the Collector's Edition of Cataclysm with a starter deck and a Landro's Gift loot card.
- Feast of Winter Veil – A special collector's set released in November 2007 which corresponds with the holiday in the online game. This comes in a presentation box which contains a booster pack from Heroes of Azeroth, Through the Dark Portal or Fires of Outland, a deck box and 10 Winter Veil themed cards, as well as 2 vanity pets.
- Darkmoon Faire – A special collector's set released in September 2008 which includes 5 preset Darkmoon Faire themed cards and 2 Through the Dark Portal booster packs.
- Arena Grand Melee – A small collector's set released to supplement the Arena theme. This was released with two decks, one for the Alliance and one for the Horde.
- Feast of Winter Veil 2012 – A special collector's set in the vein of the first Feast of Winter Veil.

== Artwork ==
As with many trading card games, a variety of different artists with different styles illustrate the cards. Artists include Chris Rahn, Wayne Reynolds, Steve Prescott, Doug Alexander, Thomas M. Baxa, Julie Bell, Mauro Cascioli, Matt Dixon, Alex Horley, Todd McFarlane, Jeremy Mohler, Ariel Olivetti, Dan Scott, Ron Spencer, Greg Staples, Mike Sutfin, Glenn Rane, Samwise, Boris Vallejo, and Paul Kidby.

Some of the card art was done by Penny Arcade's Mike Krahulik ("Gabe"). In the May 26, 2006 update of the Penny Arcade site, Krahulik revealed his artwork for a card that was based on the exploits of Leeroy Jenkins.

== Events ==
Along with weekly battleground tournaments at local hobby stores, Cryptozoic Entertainment hosted Darkmoon Faires (DMF), events that ran Friday through Sunday in cities all across the world. Previously, the most notable competition featured was the Dream Machine Championship, which the winner received a custom built computer. Darkmoon Faire Championship Events offered electronics and travel vouchers to the top finishers of its main event. However, the Darkmoon Faire itself has been emphasized as a miniature convention featuring additional games, as well as side events for players to compete for Apple electronics, gift cards, and World of Warcraft loot cards.

DMF Championship winners:

2007:

- Darkmoon Faire Los Angeles – Oliver Schmid
- Darkmoon Faire Austin – Tim Batow
- Darkmoon Faire Frankfurt – Pierre Malherbaud
- Darkmoon Faire Chicago – Brad Watson
- Darkmoon Faire Milan – Erik van der Laan
- Darkmoon Faire London – Stuart Wright
- Darkmoon Faire Philadelphia – Brian Durkin
- Darkmoon Faire Lille – Jonas Skali Lami
- Darkmoon Faire San Diego – Tomas Kuchta

2008:

- Darkmoon Faire Orlando – Brad Watson
- Darkmoon Faire Columbus – William Postlethwait
- Darkmoon Faire Stuttgart – Laurent Pagorek
- Darkmoon Faire Lyon – Bernd Reinartz
- Darkmoon Faire Seattle – Morgan Findlay
- Darkmoon Faire Antwerp – Christian Pfeiffer
- Darkmoon Faire Indianapolis – Jimmy Choi
- Darkmoon Faire New Jersey – Brad Watson
- Darkmoon Faire Paris – Pierre Malherbaud
- Darkmoon Faire Anaheim – Tim Rivera
- Darkmoon Faire Prague – Gabor Körös

2009:

- Darkmoon Faire Milton Keynes – Erik van der Laan
- Darkmoon Faire San Francisco – Damien Dufresne
- Darkmoon Faire Koln – Stuart Wright
- Darkmoon Faire Charlotte – Bobby Victory
- Darkmoon Faire Turin – Jan Palys
- Darkmoon Faire Sydney – Brad Watson
- Darkmoon Faire Boston – Pat Eshghy
- Darkmoon Faire Indianapolis – Phillip Martin
- Darkmoon Faire Amsterdam – Anssi Alkio
- Darkmoon Faire Austin – Rob Swarowski
- Darkmoon Faire Las Vegas – David Bodimer

2010:

- Darkmoon Faire Houston – Calvin Keeney
- Darkmoon Faire Guangzhou – Xie Zhi Qiang
- Darkmoon Faire Antwerp – Christian Kurze
- Darkmoon Faire Los Angeles – Alex Gellerman

2011:

- Darkmoon Faire Orlando – Stuart Wright
- Darkmoon Faire Paris – Luca Magni
- Darkmoon Faire Beijing – Qigeng Zhang
- Darkmoon Faire Chicago – Dan Clark
- Darkmoon Faire Koln – Krzysztof Morzyc
- Darkmoon Faire Shenzhen – Lo Ka Man
- Darkmoon Faire Singapore – Lee Keng Yin
- Darkmoon Faire Las Vegas – Jason Newill
- Darkmoon Faire Rimini – Brad Watson
- Darkmoon Faire Indianapolis – Ben Bellis
- Darkmoon Faire Poznań – Marcin Filipowicz
- Darkmoon Faire Philadelphia – Dan Clark
- Darkmoon Faire Rotterdam – Matthieu Laguerre
- Darkmoon Faire Shanghai – Hui Xiang

2012:

- Darkmoon Faire Los Angeles – Brad Watson
- Darkmoon Faire Cannes – Stuart Wright
- Darkmoon Faire Chengdu – Xi Lei
- Darkmoon Faire Baltimore – Hans Joachim Höh, Brad Watson and Stuart Wright
- Darkmoon Faire Madrid – Jeffrey Verwoerd
- Darkmoon Faire Las Vegas – Kellen Abel
- Darkmoon Faire Beijing – Xiang Jing
- Darkmoon Faire Prague – Martin Clement
- Darkmoon Faire Indianapolis – Norvic Santos
- Darkmoon Faire Antwerp – Anssi Alkio, Jeffrey Verwoerd and Stuart Wright
- Darkmoon Faire Shanghai – Yinan Liao
- Darkmoon Faire Atlanta – Basem Alsalah

2013:

- Darkmoon Faire Jacksonville – Randy Williams
- Darkmoon Faire Dallas – James Kandziolka
- Darkmoon Faire Shanghai – Jia Bin
- Darkmoon Faire Las Vegas – Hans Joachim Höh
- Darkmoon Faire Venice – Julian Ukeni
- Darkmoon Faire Poznań – Manuel Alvisi
- Darkmoon Faire Prague – Andrea Dorigo

=== WoW Nationals ===
The U.S. Nationals took place August 16 – August 19, 2007 at Gen Con, a gaming convention in Indianapolis, Indiana. After the first day of constructed play, any player with a record of 5–3 or better advanced to day two. Two sets of draft were played on the second day, each set with three rounds. Players sat in draft pods based on their records from day one, where they drafted two packs of Heroes of Azeroth, and two packs of Through the Dark Portal. The finals were held on the third day, played between the top eight selected after draft play concluded. Brad Watson was declared the U.S. Nationals Champion after his victory in the finals.

In 2008, the U.S. National Championship became the North American Continental Championship (NACC), which combined the Canadian and U.S. National Championship events. The winner of the 2008 NACC was Matt Markoff with a Warlock deck.

In 2009, Corey-Scott Burkhart won the NACC at Gen Con Indy with a Shaman deck.

In 2010, under new management with Cryptozoic Entertainment, NACC moved out of Gen Con Indy. Tim Rivera claimed the title for that year in his hometown of Las Vegas.

In 2011, Tim Batow emerged victorious at Las Vegas with his particular Warlock deck, nicknamed "Bunny Deck".

In 2011, Mark Mckiernan was crowned the european champion at the EUCC championship in Rimini (Italy) with the Shaman "Spider Deck".

=== World Cup ===
The World Cup Championship took place March 4–6, 2011 in Paris, France. The winners were the American team The Warriors, composed of Ben Isgur, Matt Markoff, and James Kandziolka. They played, respectively: Boarguts the Impaler, Jumo'zin, and Erondra Frostmoon. Their prizes were the Darkmoon Faire tournament scheduled in Baltimore, Maryland along with $15,000 in Amazon vouchers.

=== World Championships ===
The first World Championship took place November 30 – December 2, 2007 in San Diego, California. The winner, French player Guillaume Matignon, became the inaugural WoW TCG World Champion by defeating the French-Canadian player Eric Prieur and received $100,000, at the time it was the largest prize in TCG history.

The second World Championship took place in Paris, France from October 16 – October 19, 2008. Jim Fleckenstein of Virginia won the title using the hero Kil'zin of the Bloodscalp.

The third World Championship took place in Austin, Texas from October 9 – October 11, 2009. The format was Drums of War Block Constructed. It was won by William Postlethwait, also known as "Billy P."

The fourth World Championships took place in Indianapolis, Indiana, from August 4 – August 7, 2010. The format was Classic Constructed. German player Jonas Skali-Lami won with a Nicholas Merrick mage deck.

The fifth World Championships took place in Rotterdam, Netherlands, from November 10 – November 13, 2011. The format consisted of Core and Classic Constructed and Booster Draft. It was won by German player Hans Joachim Höh using a Rohashu Paladin deck, taking down Jim Fleckenstein's less aggressive Rohashu version in the finals.

The sixth and final World Championships took place in Atlanta, Georgia in early November 2012. Brad Watson defeated Raphael Ait-sliman in the final round.
