= Ben Rubin (Magic: The Gathering player) =

American collectible card game player

- Nationality: (United States) American
- Pro Tour debut: 1998 Pro Tour Los Angeles
- Winnings: US$187,920
- Pro Tour wins (Top 8): 0 (4)
- Grand Prix wins (Top 8): 2 (8)
- Median Pro Tour Finish: 77
- Lifetime Pro Points: 346
- Planeswalker Level: 47 (Archmage)

Ben Rubin is an American Magic: The Gathering player. Rubin played his first Pro Tour in Los Angeles at the age of 15, making it to the finals of the tournament, where he lost to David Price. He is the only player who has won two Masters tournaments. Ben Rubin also made the Top 8 of four Pro Tours and six Grand Prixs, winning two of the Grand Prix. In 2008 he was inducted into the Magic: The Gathering Hall of Fame. Despite having not attended many Pro Tours for several years, in 2015 Rubin returned to the game by playing at Pro Tour Dragons of Tarkir.

== Accomplishments ==
Season	Event type	Location	Format	Date	Rank
1997–98	Pro Tour	Los Angeles	Block Constructed	6–8 March 1998	2
1997–98	Worlds	Seattle	Standard	12–16 August 1998	2
1999–00	Pro Tour	London	Limited	15–17 October 1999	4
1999–00	Pro Tour	New York	Block Constructed	14–16 April 2000	3
1999–00	Grand Prix	Pittsburgh	Team Limited	24–25 June 2000	1
2000–01	Masters	New York	Extended	29 September–1 October 2000	5
2000–01	Invitational	Sydney	Special	16–19 November 2000	2
2000–01	Masters	Chicago	Limited	1–3 December 2000	1
2000–01	Masters	Barcelona	Block Constructed	4–6 May 2001	1
2000–01	Grand Prix	Columbus, Ohio	Team Limited	28–29 July 2001	3
2001–02	Grand Prix	Houston	Extended	5–6 January 2002	4
2002–03	Grand Prix	Boston	Limited	22–23 February 2003	5
2003–04	Grand Prix	Anaheim	Extended	13–14 December 2003	1
2003–04	Grand Prix	Oakland	Limited	7–8 February 2004	6
2015–16	Grand Prix	Oakland	Standard	9–10 January 2016	2
2016–17	Grand Prix	Louisville	Team Limited	10–11 September 2016	2

Last updated: 15 October 2016
Source: Wizards.com
