= Magic: The Gathering Pro Tour season 2003–04 =

2003–04 Pro Tour season
- Pro Player of the Year: (France) Gabriel Nassif
- Rookie of the Year: (Netherlands) Julien Nuijten
- World Champion: (Netherlands) Julien Nuijten
- Pro Tours: 7
- Grands Prix: 26
- Start of season: 23 August 2003
- End of season: 5 September 2004

The 2003–04 Pro Tour season was the ninth season of the Magic: The Gathering Pro Tour. On 23 August 2003 the season began with parallel Grand Prixs in Yokohama and London. It ended on 5 September 2004 with the conclusion of the 2004 World Championship in San Francisco. Beginning with this season Wizards of the Coast moved the Pro Tour schedule farther backwards in the year to synchronize it with the calendar year. The season consisted of 26 Grand Prixs and 7 Pro Tours, held in Boston, New Orleans, Amsterdam, Kobe, San Diego, Seattle, and San Francisco. Also the Master Series tournaments were discontinued and replaced by payout at the end of the year based on the Pro Player of the year standings. At the end of the season Gabriel Nassif was proclaimed Pro Player of the year, the first player after Kai Budde's three-year-domination period, and also the first player to win the title without winning a Pro Tour in the same season.

== Grand Prixs – Yokohama, London, Atlanta ==
GP Yokohama (23–24 August)

- Format: Block Constructed
1. (Japan) Shu Komuro
2. (Japan) Kazuki Kato
3. (Japan) Masashiro Kuroda
4. (Japan) Yuichi Yamagishi
5. (Japan) Masahiko Morita
6. (Japan) Shuhei Nakamura
7. (Japan) Kazuyuki Momose
8. (Japan) Yusuke Osaka

GP London (23–24 August)

- Format: Block Constructed
1. (Argentina) Diego Ostrovich
2. (France) Yann Hamon
3. (Italy) Mario Pascoli
4. (Norway) Eivind Nitter
5. (United States) Antonino De Rosa
6. (Argentina) Jose Barbero
7. (Canada) Josh Rider
8. (Netherlands) Frank Karsten

GP Atlanta (30–31 August)

- Format: Standard
1. (Germany) Marco Blume
2. (United States) Matt Linde
3. (United States) Joshua Wagener
4. (United States) Keith McLaughlin
5. (United States) Zvi Mowshowitz
6. (United States) Keith Thompson
7. (United States) Sean Buckley
8. (United States) Tim Bonneville

== Pro Tour – Boston (12–14 September 2003) ==
"Phoenix Foundation" had its third consecutive Pro Tour Top 4 appearance, but this time they were eliminated by eventual champions "The Brockafellars". The team consisting of William Jensen, Matt Linde, and Brock Parker had allegedly not done a single practice draft in the format.

=== Tournament data ===
Prize pool: $200,100
Players: 399 (133 teams)
Format: Team Sealed (Onslaught, Legions, Scourge) – first day, Team Rochester Draft (Onslaught-Legions-Scourge) – final two days
Head Judge: Collin Jackson

=== Top 4 ===
Semi-finals
1 | Zabutan Nemonaut | 0
4 | Original Slackers | 2
2 | Phoenix Foundation | 0
3 | The Brockafellars | 2

Finals
Original Slackers | 0
The Brockafellars | 2

=== Final standings ===
| Place | Team | Player | Prize | Pro Points | Comment |
|---|---|---|---|---|---|
| 1 | The Brockafellars | (United States) Brock Parker | $60,000 | 24 | |
| 1 | The Brockafellars | (United States) William Jensen | $60,000 | 24 | 4th Final day |
| 1 | The Brockafellars | (United States) Matt Linde | $60,000 | 24 | 2nd Final day |
| 2 | Original Slackers | (Norway) Lovre Crnobori | $30,000 | 18 | |
| 2 | Original Slackers | (United Kingdom) Jake Smith | $30,000 | 18 | |
| 2 | Original Slackers | (Sweden) Rickard Österberg | $30,000 | 18 | |
| 3 | Zabutan Nemonaut | (United States) Mike Turian | $18,000 | 12 | 3rd Final day |
| 3 | Zabutan Nemonaut | (Canada) Gary Wise | $18,000 | 12 | 4th Final day |
| 3 | Zabutan Nemonaut | (United States) Eugene Harvey | $18,000 | 12 | 2nd Final day |
| 4 | Phoenix Foundation | (Germany) Marco Blume | $15,000 | 12 | 3rd Final day |
| 4 | Phoenix Foundation | (Germany) Kai Budde | $15,000 | 12 | 9th Final day |
| 4 | Phoenix Foundation | (Germany) Dirk Baberowski | $15,000 | 12 | 5th Final day |

=== Pro Player of the year standings ===
| Rank | Player | Pro Points |
|---|---|---|
| 1 | (United States) Matt Linde | 29 |
| 2 | (United States) William Jensen | 24 |
| 2 | (United States) Brock Parker | 24 |
| 4 | (Germany) Marco Blume | 18 |
| 4 | (Norway) Lovre Crnobori | 18 |
| 4 | (Sweden) Rickard Österberg | 18 |
| 4 | (United Kingdom) Jake Smith | 18 |

== Grand Prixs – Genova, Sydney, Kansas City, Lyon ==
GP Genova (13–14 September)

- Format: Block Constructed
1. (Germany) Reinhard Blech
2. (Belgium) Jan Doise
3. (Italy) Stefano Fiore
4. (Germany) André Müller
5. (Italy) Simone Carboni
6. (Italy) Alessandro Vegna
7. (Italy) Marco Benifei
8. (Germany) Martin Heidemann

GP Sydney (4–5 October)

- Format: Rochester Draft
1. (Australia) Andrew Grain
2. (Australia) Andrew Gordon
3. (Australia) Lenny Collins
4. (Japan) Itaru Ishida
5. (Australia) Shun Jiang
6. (China) Jake Hart
7. (Australia) Daniel Turner
8. (Australia) Tim He

GP Kansas City (18–19 October)

- Format: Rochester Draft
1. (United States) Antonino De Rosa
2. (United States) Nathan Heiss
3. (United States) Ben Stark
4. (United States) Brian Kibler
5. (United States) Michael Krumb
6. (United States) Gerry Thompson
7. (United States) Justin Smith
8. (United States) Jonathan Cassidy

GP Lyon (25–26 October)

- Format: Rochester Draft
1. (France) Yann Hamon
2. (Switzerland) Bruno Carvalho
3. (Switzerland) Daniel Madan
4. (Netherlands) Jeroen Remie
5. (France) Kevin Desprez
6. (France) Loïc Degrau
7. (France) Sebastien Bernaud
8. (Netherlands) Jelger Wiegersma

== Pro Tour – New Orleans (31 October – 2 November 2003) ==
After finishing second with his team in Boston, Rickard Österberg returned to win Pro Tour New Orleans. The Extended format of New Orleans is considered to be one of the most powerful of all time and Österberg's deck was built around the soon to be banned card Tinker, too.

=== Tournament data ===
Prize pool: $200,130
Players: 318
Format: Extended
Head Judge: Mike Guptil

=== Top 8 ===
Quarter-finals
1 | Hans Joachim Höh | 1
8 | Masashi Oiso | 3
4 | Gabriel Nassif | 3
5 | Tomohiro Yokosuka | 0
2 | Yann Hamon | *
7 | Nicolas Labarre | *
3 | Eugene Harvey | 2
6 | Rickard Österberg | 3

Semi-finals
Masashi Oiso | 2
Gabriel Nassif | 3
Yann Hamon | 0
Rickard Österberg | 3

Finals
Gabriel Nassif | 2
Rickard Österberg | 3

^{*} Hamon and Labarre both had to catch a flight on the morning of the Top 8 and did not want to book two new flights. They thus played an unofficial match at their hotel on the preceding evening to decide who would officially concede to the other. Hamon won 3–2.

=== Final standings ===
| Place | Player | Prize | Pro Points | Comment |
|---|---|---|---|---|
| 1 | (Sweden) Rickard Österberg | $30,000 | 32 | 2nd Final day |
| 2 | (France) Gabriel Nassif | $20,000 | 24 | 3rd Final day |
| 3 | (France) Yann Hamon | $15,000 | 16 | |
| 4 | (Japan) Masashi Oiso | $13,000 | 16 | 2nd Final day |
| 5 | (Germany) Hans Joachim Höh | $9,500 | 12 | |
| 6 | (United States) Eugene Harvey | $8,500 | 12 | 3rd Final day |
| 7 | (Japan) Tomohiro Yokosuka | $7,500 | 12 | |
| 8 | (France) Nicolas Labarre | $6,500 | 12 | 4th Final day |

=== Pro Player of the year standings ===
| Rank | Player | Pro Points |
|---|---|---|
| 1 | (Sweden) Rickard Österberg | 50 |
| 2 | (United States) Matt Linde | 31 |
| 3 | (France) Gabriel Nassif | 30 |
| 4 | (France) Yann Hamon | 27 |
| 5 | (United States) Brock Parker | 26 |
| 5 | (United States) William Jensen | 26 |

== Grand Prixs – Shizuoka, Gothenburg, Munich, Anaheim ==
GP Shizuoka (8–9 November)

- Format: Rochester Draft
1. (Japan) Kazuki Katou
2. (Japan) Satoshi Harada
3. (Japan) Koichiro Maki
4. (Japan) Tomohide Sasagawa
5. (Japan) Kei Ikeda
6. (Japan) Ken'Ichi Fujita
7. (Japan) Ryouma Shiozu
8. (Japan) Yusuke Sasaki

GP Gothenburg (22–23 November)

- Format: Rochester Draft
1. (Netherlands) Jelger Wiegersma
2. (Finland) Tommi Hovi
3. (Denmark) Daniel Bertelsen
4. (Germany) Kai Budde
5. (England) Sam Gomersall
6. (Germany) Daniel Zink
7. (Sweden) David Linder
8. (Sweden) Benjamin Lindqvist

GP Munich (6–7 December)

- Format: Rochester Draft
1. (France) Yann Hamon
2. (Germany) Reinhard Blech
3. (Greece) Georgios Kapalas
4. (Germany) Stefan Schwaiger
5. (Germany) Tobias Kroll
6. (Germany) Hannes Scholz
7. (France) Steven Gouin
8. (Germany) Dirk Hein

GP Anaheim (13–14 December)

- Format: Extended
1. (United States) Ben Rubin
2. (United States) Nathan Saunders
3. (United States) Nick Meves
4. (United States) Peter Szigeti
5. (United States) Ben Stark
6. (United States) Paul Rietzl
7. (United States) Blake Quelle
8. (United States) Gerard Fabiano

== Pro Tour – Amsterdam (16–18 January 2004) ==
Norwegian Nicolai Herzog defeated Osamu Fujita in the finals to win Pro Tour Amsterdam. Other than Fujita and Herzog the final eight included only accomplished players with at least one other lifetime Pro Tour final day appearance.

=== Tournament data ===
Players: 347
Prize Pool: $200,130
Format: Rochester Draft (Mirrodin)
Head Judge: Gijsbert Hoogendijk

=== Top 8 ===
Quarter-finals
1 | Farid Meraghni | 1
8 | Nicolai Herzog | 3
4 | Olivier Ruel | 3
5 | Mike Turian | 1
2 | Kamiel Cornelissen | 1
7 | Osamu Fujita | 3
3 | Aeo Paquette | 0
7 | Anton Jonsson | 3

Semi-finals
Nicolai Herzog | 3
Olivier Ruel | 0
Osamu Fujita | 3
Anton Jonsson | 2

Finals
Nicolai Herzog | 3
Osamu Fujita | 0

=== Final standings ===
| Place | Player | Prize | Pro Points | Comment |
|---|---|---|---|---|
| 1 | (Norway) Nicolai Herzog | $30,000 | 32 | 3rd Final day |
| 2 | (Japan) Osamu Fujita | $20,000 | 24 | |
| 3 | (Sweden) Anton Jonsson | $15,000 | 16 | 3rd Final day |
| 4 | (France) Olivier Ruel | $13,000 | 16 | 2nd Final day |
| 5 | (Netherlands) Kamiel Cornelissen | $9,000 | 12 | 3rd Final day |
| 6 | (Canada) Aeo Paquette | $8,500 | 12 | Pro Tour debut |
| 7 | (France) Farid Meraghni | $8,000 | 12 | 2nd Final day |
| 8 | (United States) Mike Turian | $7,500 | 12 | 4th Final day |

=== Pro Player of the year standings ===
| Rank | Player | Pro Points |
|---|---|---|
| 1 | (Norway) Rickard Österberg | 52 |
| 2 | (Norway) Nicolai Herzog | 38 |
| 3 | (France) Yann Hamon | 36 |
| 4 | (Japan) Osamu Fujita | 34 |
| 4 | (United States) Matt Linde | 34 |
| 4 | (France) Gabriel Nassif | 34 |

== Grand Prixs – Okayama, Oakland, Madrid ==
GP Okayama (24–25 January)

- Format: Extended
1. (Japan) Kazuya Shiki
2. (Japan) Itaru Ishida
3. (Japan) Akira Asahara
4. (South Korea) SangRyeol Lee
5. (Japan) Shinsuke Hayashi
6. (Japan) Asuka Doi
7. (Japan) Chikara Nakajima
8. (Japan) Kazura Hirabayashi

GP Oakland (7–8 February)

- Format: Sealed and Booster Draft
1. (United States) Ken Ho
2. (United States) Dave Humpherys
3. (United States) Mike Turian
4. (United States) Ian Spaulding
5. (United States) Mitchell Tamblyn
6. (United States) Ben Rubin
7. (United States) Paul Rietzl
8. (United States) Gabe Walls

GP Madrid (21–22 February)

- Format: Sealed and Booster Draft
1. (Germany) Kai Budde
2. (Belgium) Bernardo Da Costa Cabral
3. (Germany) Dirk Hein
4. (France) Raphaël Lévy
5. (Norway) Thomas Gundersen
6. (Spain) Aniol Alcaraz
7. (Spain) Jaime Marrero
8. (Switzerland) Tommi Lindgren

== Pro Tour – Kobe (27–29 February 2004) ==
On home turf Masashiro Kuroda won the first Pro Tour title for Japan, defeating Gabriel Nassif in the finals.

=== Tournament data ===
Players: 239
Prize Pool: $200,130
Format: Mirrodin Block Constructed (Mirrodin, Darksteel)
Head Judge: Collin Jackson

=== Top 8 ===
Quarter-finals
1 | Luigi Sbrozzi | 1
8 | Jelger Wiegersma | 3
4 | Ben Stark | 2
5 | Gabriel Nassif | 3
2 | Raffaele Lo Moro | 0
7 | Masashiro Kuroda | 3
3 | Alexandre Peset | 3
6 | Stefano Fiori | 2

Semi-finals
Jelger Wiegersma | 1
Gabriel Nassif | 3
Masashiro Kuroda | 3
Alexandre Peset | 2

Finals
Gabriel Nassif | 1
Masashiro Kuroda | 3

=== Final standings ===
| Place | Player | Prize | Pro Points | Comment |
|---|---|---|---|---|
| 1 | (Japan) Masashiro Kuroda | $30,000 | 32 | 1st Japanese Player to win a Pro Tour |
| 2 | (France) Gabriel Nassif | $20,000 | 24 | 4th Final day |
| 3 | (France) Alexandre Peset | $15,000 | 16 | Pro Tour debut |
| 4 | (Netherlands) Jelger Wiegersma | $13,000 | 16 | 2nd Final day |
| 5 | (Italy) Luigi Sbrozzi | $9,000 | 12 | Pro Tour debut |
| 6 | (Italy) Raffaele Lo Moro | $8,500 | 12 | 2nd Final day |
| 7 | (United States) Ben Stark | $8,000 | 12 | |
| 8 | (Italy) Stefano Fiori | $7,500 | 12 | |

=== Pro Player of the year standings ===
| Rank | Player | Pro Points |
|---|---|---|
| 1 | (Norway) Rickard Österberg | 59 |
| 2 | (France) Gabriel Nassif | 58 |
| 3 | (Germany) Kai Budde | 43 |
| 4 | (Japan) Osamu Fujita | 42 |
| 5 | (Norway) Nicolai Herzog | 41 |

== Grand Prixs – Hong Kong, Sendai, Columbus, Birmingham, Washington DC, Bochum ==
GP Hong Kong (6–7 March)

- Format: Sealed and Booster Draft
1. (Malaysia) Chuen Hwa Tan
2. (France) Olivier Ruel
3. (Japan) Masashi Oiso
4. (United States) Gabe Walls
5. (Japan) Takuya Osawa
6. (Singapore) Steven Tan
7. (Malaysia) Terry Soh
8. (Taiwan) Chi-Chung Hwang

GP Sendai (20–21 March)

- Format: Sealed and Booster Draft
1. (Japan) Ichiro Shimura
2. (Japan) Masahiko Morita
3. (Japan) Yusuke Sasaki
4. (France) Antoine Ruel
5. (Japan) Jin Okamoto
6. (Japan) Toshihisa Yamanaka
7. (Japan) Hiroto Yasutomi
8. (Japan) Ippei Sogabe

GP Columbus (27–28 March)

- Format: Sealed and Booster Draft
1. (United States) Mike Turian
2. (United States) Craig Krempels
3. (United States) Aaron Lipcynski
4. (United States) Cedric Phillips
5. (United States) Kate Stavola
6. (United States) Matt Larson
7. (United States) Brandon Rickard
8. (United States) Brock Parker

GP Birmingham (27–28 March)

- Format: Sealed and Booster Draft
1. (Austria) Stefan Jedlicka
2. (Germany) René Kraft
3. (Netherlands) Frank Karsten
4. (England) David Grant
5. (Sweden) Mattias Jorstedt
6. (France) Jose Barbero
7. (England) Kamman Janpiam
8. (Austria) Niki Jedlicka

GP Washington D.C. (17–18 April)

- Format: Team Limited

1. Thaaaat's me

(United States) Chris Fennell
(United States) Bill Stead
(United States) Charles Gindy

2. Shenanigans

(United States) Adam Horvath
(United States) Osyp Lebedowicz
(United States) Patrick Sullivan

3. Your Move Games/Illuminati

(United States) Darwin Kastle
(United States) Rob Dougherty
(United States) Alex Shvartsman

4. Re-Elect Gore

(United States) Jon Finkel
(United States) Brian Kibler
(United States) Eric Froehlich

GP Bochum (17–18 April)

- Format: Team Limited

1. Schietkoe

(Netherlands) Stijn Cornelissen
(Netherlands) Tom van de Logt
(Netherlands) Jesse Cornelissen

2. Team Burkas

(Norway) Nicolai Herzog
(Sweden) Anton Jonsson
(Finland) Tuomo Nieminen

3. The Unusual Suspects

(Germany) David Brucker
(Germany) Reinhard Blech
(Germany) Dirk Hein

4. NPC All Stars

(France) Sylvain Lehoux
(France) Alexandre Peset
(France) Loic Degrou

== Pro Tour – San Diego (14–16 May 2004) ==
The second Mirrodin Draft Pro Tour saw three players amongst the final four, who had already finished in the Top 8 in the first Mirrodin Draft Pro Tour. Nicolai Herzog even followed his Amsterdam win up with another win victory, thus taking home the title in both Mirrodin Draft Pro Tours.

=== Tournament data ===
Players: 312
Prize Pool: $200,130
Format: Mirrodin Booster Draft (Mirrodin-Darksteel)
Head Judge: Collin Jackson

=== Top 8 ===
Quarter-finals
1 | Masashi Oiso | 1
8 | Anton Jonsson | 3
4 | Antoine Ruel | 3
5 | Angel Perez del Pozo | 2
2 | Mike Turian | 3
7 | Mark Herberholz | 0
3 | Ben Stark | 0
6 | Nicolai Herzog | 3

Semi-finals
Anton Jonsson | 2
Antoine Ruel | 3
Mike Turian | 1
Nicolai Herzog | 3

Finals
Antoine Ruel | 0
Nicolai Herzog | 3

=== Final standings ===
| Place | Player | Prize | Pro Points | Comment |
|---|---|---|---|---|
| 1 | (Norway) Nicolai Herzog | $30,000 | 32 | 4th Final day, 2nd Pro Tour win |
| 2 | (France) Antoine Ruel | $20,000 | 24 | 2nd Final day |
| 3 | (United States) Mike Turian | $15,000 | 16 | 5th Final day |
| 4 | (Sweden) Anton Jonsson | $13,000 | 16 | 4th Final day |
| 5 | (United States) Mark Herberholz | $9,000 | 12 | |
| 6 | (United States) Ben Stark | $8,500 | 12 | 2nd Final day |
| 7 | (Spain) Angel Perez del Pozo | $8,000 | 12 | Pro Tour debut |
| 8 | (Japan) Masashi Oiso | $7,500 | 12 | 3rd Final day |

=== Pro Player of the year standings ===
| Rank | Player | Pro Points |
|---|---|---|
| 1 | (Norway) Nicolai Herzog | 77 |
| 2 | (Norway) Rickard Österberg | 65 |
| 3 | (France) Gabriel Nassif | 63 |
| 4 | (France) Antoine Ruel | 53 |
| 5 | (Germany) Kai Budde | 47 |

== Grand Prixs – Brussels, Zurich ==
GP Brussels (29–30 May)

- Format: Block Constructed
1. (Germany) Tobias Henke
2. (Germany) Kai Budde
3. (Netherlands) Julien Nuijten
4. (Greece) Vasilis Fatouros
5. (Germany) Johannes Mitsios
6. (Germany) Xuan-Phi Nguyen
7. (Belgium) Maxime Fays
8. (Italy) Stefano Fiore

GP Zurich (26–27 June)

- Format: Block Constructed
1. (Switzerland) Manuel Bucher
2. (Italy) Matteo Cirigliano
3. (France) Sebastien Roux
4. (Netherlands) Frank Karsten
5. (France) Leonard Barbou
6. (France) Bertrand Fagnoni
7. (Germany) Timo Groth
8. (Luxembourg) Charles Delvaux

== Pro Tour – Seattle (9–11 July 2004) ==
Team "Von Dutch" from the Netherlands defeated Japanese "www.shop-fireBall.com2" in the finals to become the 2004 Pro Tour Seattle champions. The team consisted of Jeroen Remie, Jelger Wiegersma, and Kamiel Cornelissen.

=== Tournament data ===
Players: 321 (107 teams)
Prize Pool: $200,100
Format: Team Sealed (Mirrodin, Darksteel, Fifth Dawn) – first day, Team Rochester Draft (Mirrodin-Darksteel-Fifth Dawn)
Head Judge: Gijsbert Hoogendijk

=== Top 4 ===
Quarter-finals
1 | Von Dutch | 2
4 | Pocket Rockets | 1
3 | www.shop-fireball.com2 | 2
2 | S.A.I. | 1

Semi-finals
Von Dutch | 2
www.shop-fireball.com2 | 1

=== Final standings ===
| Place | Team | Player | Prize | Pro Points | Comment |
|---|---|---|---|---|---|
| 1 | Von Dutch | (Netherlands) Jeroen Remie | $60,000 | 24 | 3rd Final day |
| 1 | Von Dutch | (Netherlands) Jelger Wiegersma | $60,000 | 24 | 3rd Final day |
| 1 | Von Dutch | (Netherlands) Kamiel Cornelissen | $60,000 | 24 | 4th Final day |
| 2 | www.shop-fireball.com2 | (Japan) Itaru Ishida | $30,000 | 18 | |
| 2 | www.shop-fireball.com2 | (Japan) Tsuyoshi Ikeda | $30,000 | 18 | 2nd Final day |
| 2 | www.shop-fireball.com2 | (Japan) Jin Okamoto | $30,000 | 18 | 2nd Final day |
| 3 | S.A.I. | (Japan) Ichirou Shimura | $18,000 | 12 | |
| 3 | S.A.I. | (Japan) Masami Ibamoto | $18,000 | 12 | |
| 3 | S.A.I. | (Japan) Ryuuichi Arita | $18,000 | 12 | |
| 4 | Pocket Rockets | (Canada) Paul Russell | $16,200 | 12 | Pro Tour debut |
| 4 | Pocket Rockets | (Canada) Joseph Derro | $16,200 | 12 | Pro Tour debut |
| 4 | Pocket Rockets | (Canada) Matthew Wood | $16,200 | 12 | Pro Tour debut |

=== Pro Player of the year standings ===
| Rank | Player | Pro Points |
|---|---|---|
| 1 | (Norway) Nicolai Herzog | 80 |
| 2 | (France) Gabriel Nassif | 71 |
| 2 | (Sweden) Rickard Österberg | 71 |
| 4 | (Netherlands) Jelger Wiegersma | 64 |
| 5 | (France) Antoine Ruel | 61 |

== Grand Prixs – Kuala Lumpur, Orlando, New Jersey, Nagoya ==
GP Kuala Lumpur (24–25 July)

- Format: Standard
1. (Japan) Masahiko Morita
2. (Singapore) Kwan Ching Yuen
3. (China) Zhen Xing Gao
4. (Japan) Tsuyoshi Fujita
5. (Malaysia) Sim Han How
6. (Malaysia) Cheng Wee Pek
7. (Singapore) Bernard Chan
8. (Malaysia) Khang Jong Kuan

GP Orlando (24–25 July)

- Format: Block Constructed
1. (United States) Osyp Lebedowicz
2. Michael Kuhmann
3. Adam Chernoff
4. Taylor Parnell
5. (United States) William Jensen
6. (United States) Antonino De Rosa
7. (United States) Jeff Garza
8. Harry Durnan

GP New Jersey (14–15 August)

- Format: Block Constructed
1. (United States) Jeff Garza
2. (United States) Brian Kibler
3. (United States) Eugene Harvey
4. (Netherlands) Jeroen Remie
5. (Germany) Jan Holland
6. (United States) Adam Horvath
7. (France) Alexandre Peset
8. (United States) Ty Dobbertin

GP Nagoya (28–29 August)

- Format: Standard
1. (Japan) Tatsunori Kishi
2. (Japan) Keisuke Hashimoto
3. (Japan) Masami Ibamoto
4. (Japan) Shun Iizuka
5. (Japan) Toru Takeshita
6. (Japan) Yuhi Kubota
7. (Japan) Masaki Yokoi
8. (Japan) Tomoharu Saitou

== 2004 World Championships – San Francisco (1–5 September 2004) ==
Fifteen-year-old Julien Nuijten from the Netherlands won the 2004 World Championship, defeating Aeo Paquette in the finals. Gabriel Nassif had his third final eight appearance within the season and thus claimed Pro Player of the year title. It was also his and Kamiel Cornelissen's fifth overall Top 8. Germany won the national team competition, defeating Belgium in the finals.

=== Tournament data ===
Prize pool: $208,130 (individual) + $208,000 (national teams)
Players: 304
Formats: Standard, Booster Draft (Mirrodin-Darksteel-Fifth Dawn), Mirrodin Block Constructed (Mirrodin, Darksteel, Fifth Dawn)
Head Judge: Gijsbert Hoogendijk, Collin Jackson

=== Top 8 ===
Quarter-finals
1 | Kamiel Cornelissen | 1
8 | Manuel Bevand | 3
4 | Aeo Paquette | 3
5 | Gabriel Nassif | 1
2 | Julien Nuijten | 3
7 | Murray Evans | 2
3 | Terry Soh | 2
6 | Ryou Ogura | 3

Semi-finals
Manuel Bevand | 1
Aeo Paquette | 3
Julien Nuijten | 3
Ryou Ogura | 2

Finals
Aeo Paquette | 1
Julien Nuijten | 3

=== Final standings ===
| Place | Player | Prize | Pro Points | Comment |
|---|---|---|---|---|
| 1 | (Netherlands) Julien Nuijten | $35,000 | 32 | Pro Tour debut |
| 2 | (Canada) Aeo Paquette | $23,000 | 24 | 2nd Final day |
| 3 | (Japan) Ryou Ogura | $15,000 | 16 | |
| 4 | (France) Manuel Bevand | $13,000 | 16 | |
| 5 | (Netherlands) Kamiel Cornelissen | $9,500 | 12 | 5th Final day |
| 6 | (Malaysia) Terry Soh | $8,500 | 12 | |
| 7 | (France) Gabriel Nassif | $7,500 | 12 | 5th Final day |
| 8 | (Canada) Murray Evans | $6,500 | 12 | |

=== National team competition ===
1. Germany (Sebastian Zink, Torben Twiefel, Roland Bode)
2. Belgium (Dilson Ramos Da Fonseca, Vincent Lemoine, Geoffrey Siron)

== Pro Player of the year final standings ==
After the World Championship Gabriel Nassif was awarded the Pro Player of the year title. He was the first player to win the title without winning a Pro Tour in the same season.

| Rank | Player | Pro Points | Prize |
|---|---|---|---|
| 1 | (France) Gabriel Nassif | 86 | $20,000 |
| 2 | (Norway) Nicolai Herzog | 82 | $19,800 |
| 3 | (Sweden) Rickard Österberg | 76 | $19,600 |
| 4 | (France) Antoine Ruel | 68 | $19,400 |
| 5 | (Netherlands) Jelger Wiegersma | 66 | $19,200 |
