= Magic: The Gathering Pro Tour season 2009 =

2009 Pro Tour season
- Pro Player of the Year: (Japan) Yuuya Watanabe
- Rookie of the Year: (Germany) Lino Burgold
- World Champion: (Portugal) André Coimbra
- Pro Tours: 4
- Grands Prix: 19
- Hall of Fame inductions: Antoine Ruel; Kamiel Cornelissen; Frank Karsten
- Start of season: 17 January 2009
- End of season: 22 November 2009

The 2009 Pro Tour season was the fourteenth season of the Magic: The Gathering Pro Tour. It began on 17 January 2009 with Grand Prix Los Angeles, and ended on 22 November 2009 with the conclusion of the 2009 World Championship in Rome. The season consisted of nineteen Grand Prixs, and four Pro Tours, located in Kyoto, Honolulu, Austin, and Rome. At the end of the season, Yuuya Watanabe was awarded the Pro Player of the Year, making him the first player to win both that title and the Rookie of the Year title which he had won two years prior. Frank Karsten, Kamiel Cornelissen, and Antoine Ruel were inducted into the Hall of Fame at the world championships in Rome.

== Mode ==
Four Pro Tours and nineteen Grand Prixs will be held in the 2009 season. Further Pro Points will be awarded at national championships. These Pro Points will be used mainly to determine the Pro Player club levels of players participating in these events, but also decide which player will be awarded the Pro Player of the year title at the end of the season. Based on final standings Pro Points were awarded as follows:

Rank	Pro Points awarded at			
Rank	Pro Tour	Grand Prix	Nationals	Worlds (Team)
1	25	10	10	6
2	20	8	8	5
3–4	16	6	6	4
5–8	12	5	4	3
9–12	8	4	2	2
13–16	8	3	1	1
17–24	7	2		
25–32	6	2		
33–64	5	1		
65–100	4			
101–200	3			
201+	2			

== Grand Prix – Los Angeles, Rotterdam ==
GP Los Angeles (17–18 January)

- Attendance: 834
- Format: Extended
1. (United States) Luis Scott-Vargas
2. (United States) Brett Piazza
3. (Panama) Saul Alvarado
4. (United States) Mat Marr
5. (United States) Michael Jacob
6. (United States) Carl Hendrix
7. (United States) Mark Herberholz
8. (United States) Asher Hecht

GP Rotterdam (21–22 February)

- Attendance: 1227
- Format: Limited
1. (Netherlands) Arjan van Leeuwen
2. (Netherlands) Robert van Meedevort
3. (Japan) Shuhei Nakamura
4. (Germany) Alex Fanghänel
5. (Germany) Aaron Brackmann
6. (Czech Republic) Michal Hebky
7. (Czech Republic) Tomas Langer
8. (Germany) Reinhold Kohl

== Pro Tour – Kyoto (27 February – 1 March 2009) ==
Pro Tour veteran Gabriel Nassif defeated Luis Scott-Vargas in the finals of Pro Tour Kyoto, giving him his first individual title in his ninth Top 8.

=== Tournament data ===
Prize pool: $230,795
Players: 381
Format: Standard, Booster Draft
Head Judge: Riccardo Tessitori

=== Top 8 ===
Quarter-finals
1	Luis Scott-Vargas	3
8	Masayasu Tanahashi	0
4	Cedric Philips	0
5	Brian Robinson	3
2	Matteo Orsini Jones	2
7	Gabriel Nassif	3
3	Akimasa Yamamoto	3
6	Jan Ruess	2

Semi-finals
Luis Scott-Vargas	3
Brian Robinson	1
Gabriel Nassif	3
Akimasa Yamamoto	1

Finals
Luis Scott-Vargas	2
Gabriel Nassif	3

=== Final standings ===
Place	Player	Prize	Pro Points	Comment
1	(France) Gabriel Nassif	$40,000	25	9th Final day, 2nd Pro Tour win
2	(United States) Luis Scott-Vargas	$20,000	20	2nd Final day
3	(Japan) Akimasa Yamamoto	$15,000	16	
4	(United States) Brian Robinson	$13,000	16	Pro Tour debut
5	(England) Matteo Orsini-Jones	$11,000	12	
6	(United States) Cedric Philips	$10,500	12	
7	(Germany) Jan Ruess	$10,000	12	2nd Final day
8	(Japan) Masayu Tanahashi	$9,500	12	

=== Pro Player of the year standings ===
Rank	Player	Pro Points
1	(United States) Luis Scott-Vargas	30
2	(France) Gabriel Nassif	29
3	(United States) Brian Robinson	16
3	(Japan) Akimasa Yamamoto	16
5	(Czech Republic) Martin Juza	14

== Grand Prixs – Chicago, Hanover, Singapore, Kobe, Barcelona, Seattle ==
GP Chicago (7–8 March)

- Attendance: 1230
- Format: Legacy
1. (France) Gabriel Nassif
2. (United States) Andrew Probasco
3. (United States) Paul Rietzl
4. (United States) James Mink
5. (United States) Brian Kowal
6. (United States) Tommy Kolowith
7. (Canada) David Caplan
8. (United States) Brian Six

GP Kobe (18–19 April)

- Attendance: 545
- Format: Extended
1. (Japan) Tomoharu Saitou
2. (Japan) Yuuya Watanabe
3. (Taiwan) Kuo Tzu-Ching
4. (Japan) Kentarou Yamamoto
5. (Japan) Katsuya Ueda
6. (Japan) Keiichi Kondou
7. (Japan) Kenji Hamamoto
8. (Japan) Ryouma Shiozu

GP Hanover (13–14 March)

- Attendance: 925
- Format: Extended
1. (Germany) Lino Burgold
2. (United States) Gaudenis Vidugiris
3. (Czech Republic) Lukas Kraft
4. (Austria) Karim Bauer
5. (Sweden) Kenny Öberg
6. (Belgium) Pascal Vieren
7. (Austria) Helmut Summersberger
8. (Czech Republic) Ondra Posolda

GP Barcelona (23–24 May)

- Attendance: 1495
- Format: Standard
1. (Spain) Joel Calafell
2. (Italy) Riccardo Neri
3. (Brazil) Paulo Vitor Damo da Rosa
4. (United States) Samuel Black
5. (Netherlands) Hugo De Jong
6. (Republic of Ireland) Sean Og Murphy
7. (Portugal) Ricardo Venancio
8. (Greece) George Paraskuopoulos

GP Singapore (21–22 March)

- Attendance: 370
- Format: Extended
1. (Japan) Tomoharu Saitou
2. (Japan) Masaya Kitayama
3. (Singapore) Chin Heng Tan
4. (Japan) Yuuta Takahashi
5. (Singapore) Yong Han Choo
6. (Taiwan) Liang Chen
7. (United States) Samuel Black
8. (Taiwan) Kuo Tzu-Ching

GP Seattle (30–31 May)

- Attendance: 1127
- Format: Standard
1. (France) Yann Massicard
2. (United States) Benjamin Lundquist
3. (Brazil) Paulo Vitor Damo da Rosa
4. (United States) Charles Gendron Dupont
5. (United States) Luis Scott-Vargas
6. (Russia) Nicolay Potovin
7. (United States) Michael Jacob
8. (United States) Ari Lax

== Pro Tour Honolulu (5–7 June 2009) ==
In his second Pro Tour finals appearance, Kazuya Mitamura defeated Pro Tour newcomer Michal Hebky.

=== Tournament data ===
Prize pool: $230,795
Players: 396
Format: Booster Draft, Block Constructed
Head Judge: Toby Elliot

=== Top 8 ===
Quarter-finals
1	Christophe Gregoir	1
8	Kazuya Mitamura	3
4	Paul Rietzl	3
5	Tom Ross	2
2	Brian Kibler	1
7	Conley Woods	3
3	Zac Hill	2
6	Michal Hebky	3

Semi-finals
Kazuya Mitamura	3
Paul Rietzl	0
Conley Woods	2
Michal Hebky	3

Finals
Kazuya Mitamura	3
Michal Hebky	2

=== Final standings ===
Place	Player	Prize	Pro Points	Comment
1	(Japan) Kazuya Mitamura	$40,000	25	3rd Final day
2	(Czech Republic) Michael Hebky	$20,000	20	
3	(United States) Paul Rietzl	$15,000	16	
4	(United States) Conley Woods	$13,000	16	
5	(Belgium) Christophe Gregoir	$11,000	12	
6	(United States) Zac Hill	$10,500	12	
7	(United States) Brian Kibler	$10,000	12	2nd Final day
8	(United States) Tom Ross	$9,500	12	

=== Pro Player of the year standings ===
Rank	Player	Pro Points
1	(United States) Luis Scott-Vargas	45
2	(France) Gabriel Nassif	44
3	(Japan) Tomoharu Saitou	36
4	(Japan) Kazuya Mitamura	32
5	(Czech Republic) Michal Hebky	27

== Grand Prixs – Sao Paulo, Boston, Brighton, Bangkok, Niigata, Prague, Melbourne ==
GP São Paulo (13–14 June)

- Attendance: 639
- Format: Standard
1. (Brazil) Daniel Almeida Alvez
2. (Argentina) Andres Monsalve
3. (Brazil) Guilherme Vieira
4. (Brazil) Wendell Santini
5. (Brazil) Allison Abe
6. (Brazil) Diego Crusius
7. (Chile) Juan Veliz
8. (Brazil) Daniel Frias

GP Bangkok (22–23 August)

- Attendance: 414
- Format: Limited
1. (Japan) Shingou Kurihara
2. (Czech Republic) Martin Juza
3. (Japan) Koutarou Ootsuka
4. (England) Matteo Orsini Jones
5. (Netherlands) Ruud Warmenhoven
6. (Japan) Yuuya Watanabe
7. (Singapore) Ryan Luo
8. (China) Zhiyang Zhang

GP Melbourne (10–11 October)

- Attendance: 416
- Format: Limited
1. (Japan) Yuuya Watanabe
2. (Japan) Tomoharu Saitou
3. (Malaysia) Marcus Teo
4. (Australia) Shane Daliston
5. (Australia) Brett Hughes
6. (Australia) Jacky Zhang
7. (Australia) Joel Piotto
8. (Australia) Steven Aplin

GP Boston (1–2 August)

- Attendance: 1503
- Format: Limited
1. (United States) Marlon Egolf
2. (United States) Ben Stark
3. (United States) David Feinstein
4. (United States) Jason Lundberg
5. (United States) Jonathan Pearlman
6. (United States) Brian Lynch
7. (United States) Bradley Wojceshonek
8. (United States) Zach Efland

GP Niigata (29–30 August)

- Attendance: 722
- Format: Limited
1. (Japan) Tsuyoshi Ikeda
2. (Japan) Shingou Kurihara
3. (Japan) Ren Ishikawa
4. (Japan) Hajime Nakamura
5. (Japan) Sho Ishikawa
6. (Japan) Takaya Saitou
7. (United States) Gaudenis Vidugiris
8. (Japan) Yuuya Watanabe

GP Brighton (8–9 August)

- Attendance: 760
- Format: Limited
1. (France) Olivier Ruel
2. (Czech Republic) Martin Juza
3. (Belgium) Dennis Stone
4. (Belgium) Mark Dictus
5. (Netherlands) Kevin Grove
6. (Belgium) Robbert Menten
7. (Germany) Reinhold Kohl
8. (Scotland) Joseph Jackson

GP Prague (5–6 September)

- Attendance: 1541
- Format: Limited
1. (Germany) Jan Schmidt
2. (Japan) Yuuya Watanabe
3. (Slovenia) Bojan Zunko
4. (Croatia) Ognjen Cividini
5. (Germany) Julien De Graat
6. (Czech Republic) Lukas Vozdecky
7. (Slovakia) Marcel Kondrk
8. (Poland) Radek Kaczmarczyk

== Pro Tour Austin (16–18 October 2009) ==
Both enjoying a comeback to the top level of Magic, Brian Kibler and Tsuyoshi Ikeda met in the finals, with Kibler winning in his second top eight in 2009.

=== Tournament data ===
Prize pool: $230,795
Players: 416
Format: Extended, Booster Draft
Head Judge: Riccardo Tessitori

=== Top 8 ===
Quarter-finals
1	Tsuyoshi Ikeda	3
8	Paulo Vitor Damo da Rosa	2
4	Martin Juza	2
5	Naoki Shimizu	3
2	Evangelos Papatrarouchas	2
7	Brian Kibler	3
3	Yuuya Watanabe	2
6	Hunter Burton	3

Semi-finals
Tsuyoshi Ikeda	3
Naoki Shimizu	1
Brian Kibler	3
Hunter Burton	2

Finals
Tsuyoshi Ikeda	0
Brian Kibler	3

=== Final standings ===
Place	Player	Prize	Pro Points	Comment
1	(United States) Brian Kibler	$40,000	25	3rd Final day
2	(Japan) Tsuyoshi Ikeda	$20,000	20	4th Final day
3	(Japan) Naoki Shimizu	$15,000	16	
4	(United States) Hunter Burton	$13,000	16	
5	(Greece) Evangelos Papatrarouchas	$11,000	12	
6	(Japan) Yuuya Watanabe	$10,500	12	
7	(Czech Republic) Martin Juza	$10,000	12	2nd Final day
8	(Brazil) Paulo Vitor Damo da Rosa	$9,500	12	5th Final day

=== Pro Player of the year standings ===
Rank	Player	Pro Points
1	(Japan) Yuuya Watanabe	62
2	(Czech Republic) Martin Juza	54
3	(Japan) Tomoharu Saitou	51
4	(France) Gabriel Nassif	50
5	(Japan) Shuhei Nakamura	48
5	(United States) Luis Scott-Vargas	48

== Grand Prixs – Tampa, Kitakyushu, Paris, Minneapolis ==
GP Tampa (24–25 October)

- Attendance: 834
- Format: Limited
1. (United States) Gaudenis Vidugiris
2. (United States) Conley Woods
3. (United States) John Skinner
4. (United States) John May
5. (France) Gabriel Nassif
6. (United States) Alex Majlaton
7. (United States) Tom Ross
8. (Czech Republic) Martin Juza

GP Minneapolis (14–15 November)

- Attendance: 1187
- Format: Limited
1. (United States) Zohar Bhagat
2. (United States) Matthew Sperling
3. (United States) Brian Kibler
4. (United States) Brad Nelson
5. (United States) Owen Turtenwald
6. (United States) David Ochoa
7. (United States) Mike Gualtieri
8. (United States) Tom Ross

GP Kitakyushu (31 October – 1 November)

- Attendance: 501
- Format: Limited
1. (Japan) Taisuke Ishii
2. (Japan) Masashi Oiso
3. (Japan) Jun'ya Iyanaga
4. (Japan) Ken Yukuhiro
5. (Japan) Yuuya Watanabe
6. (Japan) Katsuhiro Mori
7. (Japan) Takeshi Takagi
8. (Japan) Hironobu Sugaya

GP Paris (7–8 November)

- Attendance: 1961
- Format: Limited
1. (Germany) Adrian Rosada
2. (Germany) Danny Ecker
3. (Germany) Lino Burgold
4. (Belgium) Niels Viaene
5. (Austria) Herbert Engleitner
6. (Germany) Bernd Brendemühl
7. (France) Jérémy Dezani
8. (France) Gonzague Allouchery

== 2009 World Championships – Rome (19–22 November 2009) ==
The 2009 World Championship marked several firsts in Pro Tour history. For the first time ever, eight countries were represented in the quarterfinals, and there were no American or Japanese players in the top eight. Playing in his second Worlds top eight, André Coimbra of Portugal defeated Austrian David Reitbauer to become World Champion. In the team event, Austria finished second as well, losing to the Chinese team in the final.

=== Tournament data ===
Prize pool: $245,245 (individual) + $192,425 (teams)
Players: 409 (55 National teams)
Formats: Standard, Booster Draft, Extended
Team Formats: Standard, Extended, Legacy
Head Judge: Sheldon Menery

=== Top 8 ===
Quarter-finals
1	David Reitbauer	3
8	Florian Pils	0
4	Terry Soh	3
5	Manuel Bucher	2
2	William Cavaglieri	2
7	Bram Snepvangers	3
3	André Coimbra	3
6	Marijn Lybaert	1

Semi-finals
David Reitbauer	3
Terry Soh	2
Bram Snepvangers	2
André Coimbra	3

Finals
David Reitbauer	0
André Coimbra	3

=== Final standings ===
Place	Player	Prize	Pro Points	Comment
1	(Portugal) André Coimbra	$45,000	25	2nd Final day, first Portuguese player to win a Pro Tour
2	(Austria) David Reitbauer	$24,000	20	
3	(Malaysia) Terry Soh	$15,000	16	3rd Final day
4	(Netherlands) Bram Snepvangers	$14,000	16	4th Final day
5	(Italy) William Cavaglieri	$11,000	12	
6	(Switzerland) Manuel Bucher	$10,500	12	
7	(Belgium) Marijn Lybaert	$10,000	12	3rd Final day
8	(Germany) Florian Pils	$9,500	12	

=== National team competition ===
1. China (Wu Tong, Bo Li, Zhiyang Zhang)
2. Austria (Benedikt Klauser, Benjamin Rozhon, Bernhard Lehner)
3. Czech Republic (Lukas Jaklovsky, Lukas Blohon, Jan Kotrla)
4. Netherlands (Kevin Grove, Niels Noorlander, Tom van Lamoen)

== Pro Player of the year final standings ==
After the World Championship, Yuuya Watanabe was awarded the Pro Player of the year title, making him the fifth consecutive Japanese player to win the award.

Rank	Player	Pro Points
1	(Japan) Yuuya Watanabe	78
2	(Japan) Tomoharu Saitou	66
3	(Czech Republic) Martin Juza	64
4	(France) Gabriel Nassif	60
5	(Japan) Shuhei Nakamura	56
5	(Brazil) Paulo Vitor Damo da Rosa	56
7	(United States) Luis Scott-Vargas	52
8	(Japan) Kazuya Mitamura	50

== Performance by country ==
The United States had the most Top 8 appearances at ten, but they also had by far the most players playing in the Pro Tour. With Japan at 17 they share the highest number of level 4+ professional Magic players, too.

Country	T8	Q	Q/T8	M	GT	Best Player (PPts)
United States	10	426	43	208	17	Luis Scott-Vargas (52)
Japan	6	175	29	149	17	Yuuya Watanabe (78)
Germany	2	73	37	168	5	Lino Burgold (32)
Belgium	2	34	17	191	4	Marijn Lybaert (25)
Czech Republic	2	35	18	113	3	Martin Juza (64)
France	1	81	81	198	5	Gabriel Nassif (60)
Brazil	1	39	39	196	2	Paulo Vitor Damo da Rosa (56)
Italy	1	73	73	248	2	Riccardo Neri (24)

T8 = Number of players from that country appearing in a Pro Tour Top 8; Q = Number of players from that country participating in Pro Tours; M = Median finish over all PTs; GT = Gravy Trainers (aka players with a Pro Players Club level of 4 or more) from that country created in the 2009 season; Best Player (PPts) = Player with the most Pro Points from that country, Pro Points of that player in brackets.
