= Brian Kibler =

American collectible card game player, game designer, and streamer

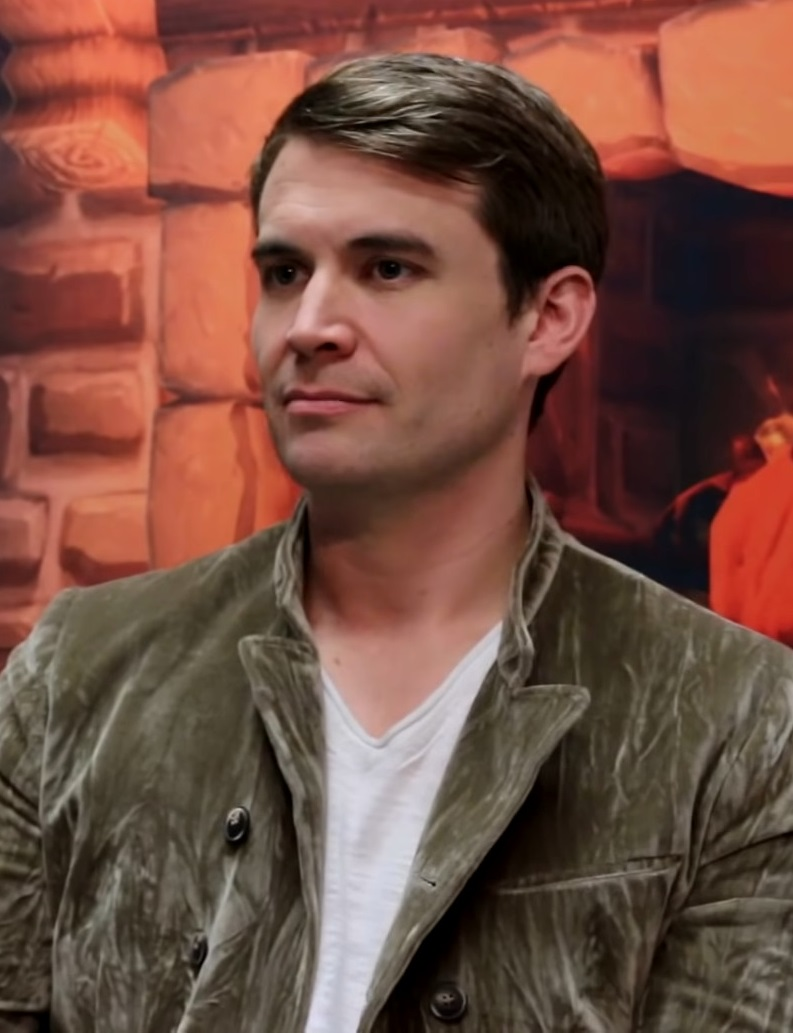
- Kibler being interviewed at the 2018 Hearthstone Fall Invitational tournament
- Nickname: The Dragonmaster
- Born: Idaho, U.S
- Nationality: American
- Pro Tour debut: Pro Tour New York 1996 (junior); Pro Tour Chicago 1997 (senior)
- Winnings: $279,747
- Pro Tour wins (Top 8): 2 (5)
- Grand Prix wins (Top 8): 3 (13)
- Median Pro Tour Finish: 85
- Lifetime Pro Points: 377
- Planeswalker Level: 50 (Archmage)

Brian McCormick Kibler is an American collectible card game player, game designer, and streamer. Previously, he designed Ascension: Chronicle of the Godslayer with Justin Gary, Rob Dougherty and John Fiorillo, and worked on Chaotic and SolForge and was the lead designer of the World of Warcraft Trading Card Game.

Kibler is also a professional card player, and has had great success at Magic: The Gathering with five Pro Tour Top 8s, winning Pro Tour Austin in 2009 and Pro Tour Honolulu in 2012. He also has 13 Grand Prix Top 8s, winning three of them including the first one held in the 1997–98 season and most recently Grand Prix Sendai. In August 2004, he won the inaugural VS System Pro Circuit event taking home $40,000 and a spot in history as the game's first champion. Owing to a pause in his career, he was finally inducted into the Hall of Fame in 2010.

== Career ==
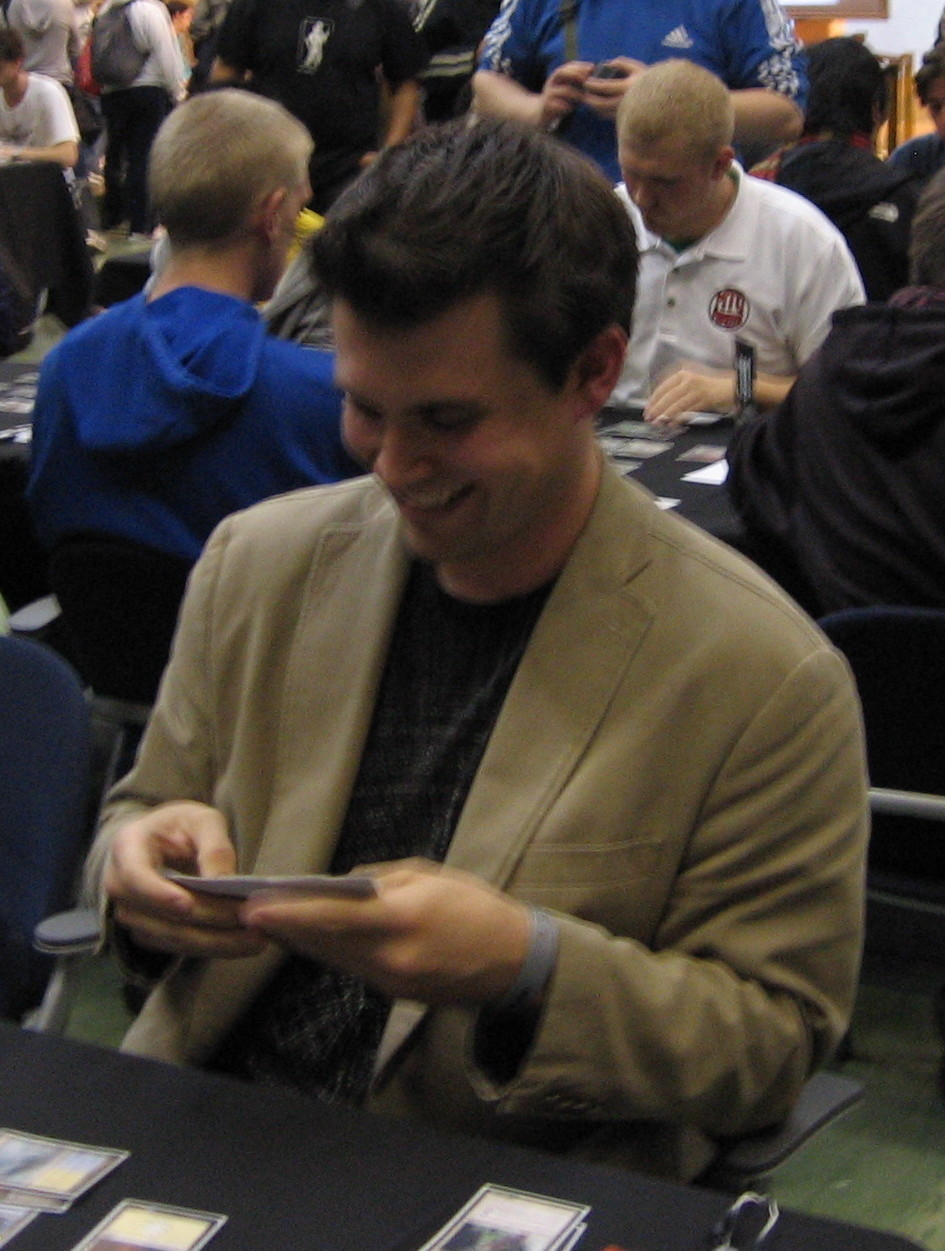
Kibler at the 2009 Magic Worlds tournament in Rome

Kibler began his Magic: The Gathering career at the age of fifteen, placing 30th in the Junior Division of the first-ever Pro Tour, Pro Tour New York 1996. Kibler would not qualify for the senior Pro Tour until Pro Tour Chicago 1997, which he qualified for by winning Grand Prix Toronto 1997. All his opponents in the Top 8 of Grand Prix Toronto went on to work at Wizards of the Coast, including Mike Turian, Matt Place and Erik Lauer. Kibler would also attend Pro Tour Los Angeles in the 1997–1998 season, placing within the Top 64, however he would not return to the Pro Tour until the 1999–2000 season.

Kibler made his first Pro Tour Top 8 at Pro Tour Chicago 2000. This was also the tournament where Kibler would earn the nickname of The Dragonmaster, after beating Jon Finkel in the Swiss rounds and Zvi Mowshowitz in the quarterfinals with a combination of Rith, the Awakener and Armadillo Cloak. He would go on to lose to Kai Budde in the semi-finals, taking third place in the overall standings. This would be Kibler's best Pro Tour performance before he retired from the game at the end of the 2004 season. In 2005, Kibler was one of a small number of players commemorated by Wizards of the Coast with a "Pro Player" collectible reference card.

After taking several years away from Magic (while working at Wizards' direct competitor Upper Deck) he returned in 2009. Kibler claims that a major motivating factor for his return was his desire to enter the Magic: The Gathering Hall of Fame, which was created the year following his retirement. Kibler would make consecutive Pro Tour Top 8s upon his return, making Top 8 at Pro Tour Honolulu before going on to win his first Pro Tour at Pro Tour Austin, defeating Tsuyoshi Ikeda in the tournament finals. By the end of the year he placed in the top 10 of the year's best performers on the Magic Pro Tour, achieving enough points to guarantee him invites to major championships, free air travel, and a guaranteed appearance fee for attending all 2010 events. Additionally, he was tied for 6th among player committee votes of the possible entrants for the 2009 Hall of Fame, carrying around 20% of their vote. In 2010, Kibler's high performance continued, granting him his third Grand Prix title, another Pro Tour Top 8, and finally induction into the Hall of Fame. Kibler was inducted in the Hall of Fame Class of 2010 alongside Gabriel Nassif and Bram Snepvangers.

In the 2012 season, Kibler made his fifth career Pro Tour Top 8 at Pro Tour Dark Ascension in Honolulu. The Top 8 would also feature two other Hall of Fame members in Jon Finkel and Jelger Wiegersma. Brian Kibler defeated Finkel in the semi-finals in a match considered by commentators to be among the best matches in Magic history. This led to Kibler playing against teammate Paulo Vitor Damo da Rosa in the finals. Kibler then defeated Damo da Rosa 3–2 to win his second Pro Tour title. By winning the Pro Tour, Kibler secured his place in the first Magic Players Championship. Kibler also became the United States National Champion by being the American player with the highest number of Pro Points after Pro Tour Avacyn Restored, leading the United States National Team to 12th place at the inaugural World Magic Cup.

As of 2017, Kibler had earned a total of $279,747 in tournament winnings over his career, placing him then at #11 of all time earnings; and as of 2018, at #18 on the same list.

=== Hearthstone ===
Kibler also plays the digital card game Hearthstone, winning the ChallengeStone tournaments in May 2015 and November 2016, the latter taking place at BlizzCon 2016. He took second place in the GEICO Brawl #1 in July 2015. Kibler has also been a commentator on Hearthstone tournaments, including the BlizzCon and Championship tournaments. Kibler has been regularly streaming his Hearthstone gameplay on Twitch, and has a reputation in the community of being diplomatic, level-headed and rarely becoming angry. He prefers Constructed format to Arena.

In October 2019, Kibler announced that he would no longer be working with Blizzard as a commentator on their events, as a result of their controversial decision to ban esport competitor Ng Wai Chung for saying "liberate Hong Kong, the revolution of our times" in a post-game interview. Kibler stated that although he agreed that Blizzard should issue a penalty, the actual penalty was too harsh. As such, he could "realistically never work with Hearthstone again". He still frequently streams Hearthstone.

== Personal life ==
Kibler grew up in Hampstead, New Hampshire and attended boarding school at Phillips Academy in Andover, Massachusetts. Kibler later attended Emory University in Atlanta, Georgia, majoring in Philosophy and Religion. On October 12, 2014, Kibler married Natalie Warren. On December 21, 2019, Kibler announced that he and his wife were separating.

In September, 2025, Kibler proposed to Olivia Gobert-Hicks live on stage at MagicCon Las Vegas.

Preceded by Ali Antrazi	Magic US National Champion; 2012	Succeeded by Josh Utter-Leyton
