= Gabriel Nassif =

French professional card player (born 1983)

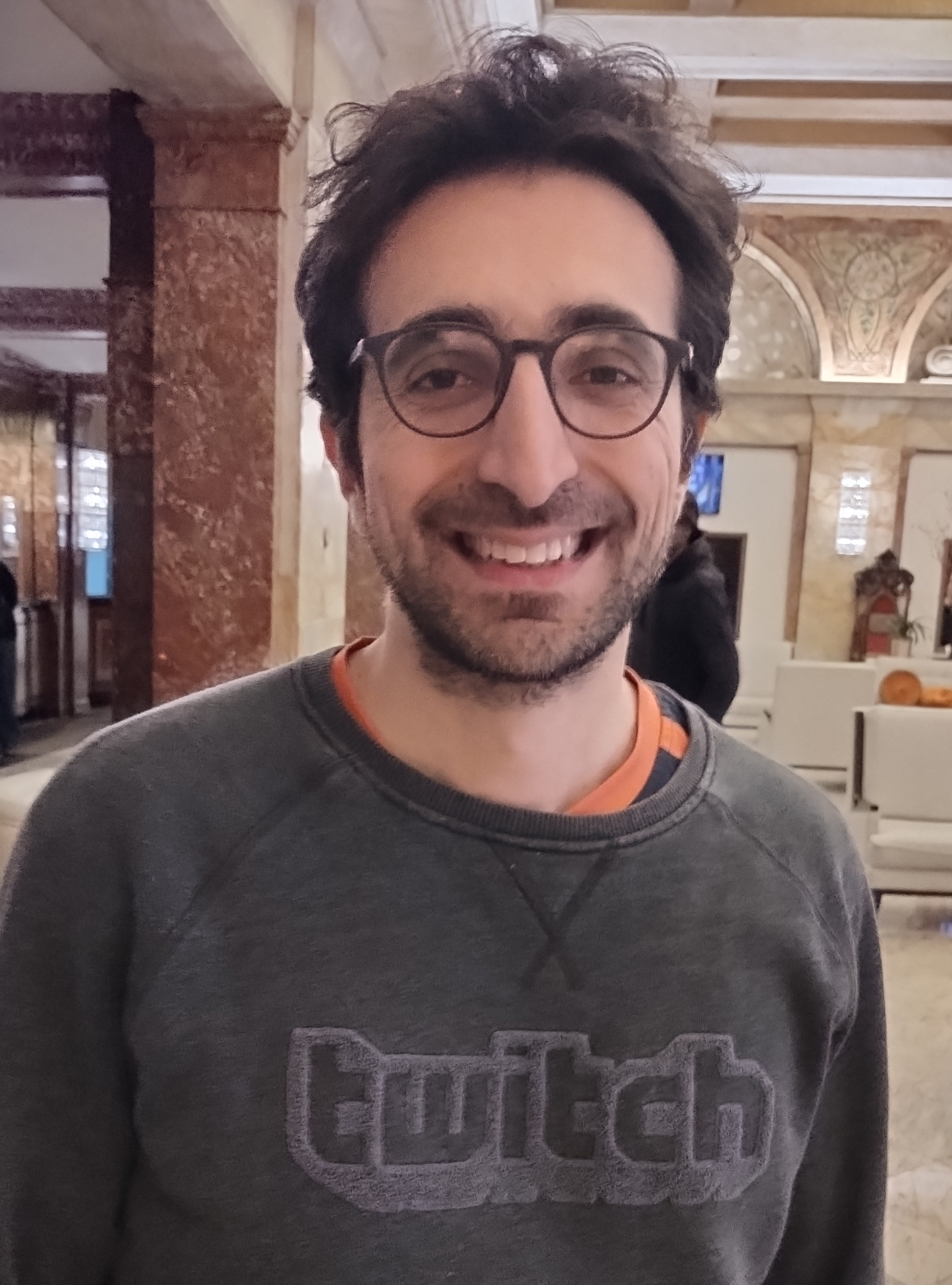
- Nassif in 2025
- Nickname: YellowHat
- Born: 8 November 1983 (age 43)
- Nationality: (France) French
- Winnings: $709,810
- Pro Tour wins (Top 8): 2 (10)
- Grand Prix wins (Top 8): 1 (7)
- Lifetime Pro Points: 470
- Planeswalker Level: 49 (Archmage)

Gabriel Nassif (born 8 November 1983) is a French professional card player. He is known for his continuous success on the Magic: The Gathering Pro Tour and was the 2004 Pro Tour Player of the Year. He also enjoys playing poker, having moderate success at the World Series of Poker. In 2010, Nassif was inducted into the Magic: The Gathering Hall of Fame.

== Magic: The Gathering ==
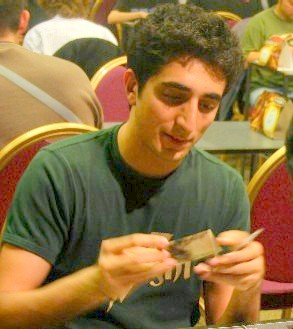
Nassif playing Magic in 2006

Gabriel Nassif first caught public attention at Magic Block Constructed Grand Prix London, 2001 where he reached the finals with his aggressive White/Blue/Red deck, and lost to German "Juggernaut" Kai Budde. This was only the first of many successes Nassif would have in Constructed. At that time he was already wearing his trademark yellow hat that eventually led to his nickname "Yellow Hat".

Only one week later Nassif made Top 4 at Pro Tour: New York 2001 with teammates Nicolas Olivieri and Amiel Tenenbaum, in what was only his second Pro Tour. He again lost in the finals to Kai Budde's team Phoenix Foundation.

After a relatively quiet year and a half, Nassif returned to success with an impressive string of high finishes, including fifth place at Pro Tour: Venice 2003, second place at the 2003 Yokohama Masters, ninth place at the 2003 World Championships, second place at Pro Tour: New Orleans 2003, second place at Pro Tour: Kobe 2004, seventh place at the 2004 World Championships, and Pro Tour: Atlanta 2005 champion with teammates Gabriel Tsang and David Rood as Team Nova.

With three Pro Tour Top Eights in the 2003–04 season including two runner-up finishes, Nassif earned the 2004 Player of the Year award. He has been dubbed by many as the best Constructed player in Magic. Indeed, he has often met success with home-made designs. Tooth and Nail, a deck directly derived from Nassif's TwelvePost deck he piloted to the finals at the 2004 Pro Tour Kobe, was one of the best performing deck in Standard until Mirrodin rotated out of the format in 2005. He showed his gaming prowess again when he made the Top 8 of the 2006 World Championships piloting a blue/white MartyrTron deck that, according to Randy Buehler, "broke the format". Nassif lost in the semifinals to Makahito Mihara and his Dragonstorm combo deck.

Ironically, Nassif made Top 8 of the 2007 World Championships with a mono-red Dragonstorm deck designed by him and American teammate Patrick Chapin, where he again made a semifinal exit while playing against Patrick Chapin in the mono-red Dragonstorm mirror. 2008 was a weaker season for Nassif. His only significant finish was a second place at Grand Prix Brussels. It was also the first season since 2000–01 that Nassif did not reach the Top 8 of a Pro Tour. The following season Nassif won the first Pro Tour of the season with a 61-card five colour control deck. He then followed up his PT win with a first-place finish at the next event: Grand Prix Chicago.

=== Distinctions ===
- Nassif was the first player to win the Player of the Year race without a Pro Tour victory that season.
- Nassif has lost more Pro Tour Finals than any other player.
- Nassif defeated Nicolai Herzog to become Player of the Year, despite the fact that Herzog had won two Pro Tours that year.
- According to Ask Wizards, Nassif also boasts the highest-ever constructed rating at 2318 in round 18 of Pro Tour–Kobe in February 2004.

=== Accomplishments ===
Season	Event type	Location	Format	Date	Rank
2001–02	Grand Prix	London	Block Constructed	1–2 September 2001	2
2001–02	Pro Tour	New York	Team Limited	7–9 September 2001	2
2002–03	Pro Tour	Venice	Block Constructed	21–23 March 2003	5
2002–03	Grand Prix	Prague	Sealed and Booster Draft	12–13 April 2003	6
2002–03	Masters	Yokohama	Extended	8–11 May 2003	2
2003–04	Pro Tour	New Orleans	Extended	31 October–2 November 2003	2
2003–04	Pro Tour	Kobe	Block Constructed	27–29 February 2004	2
2003–04	Nationals	Tours	Standard and Booster Draft	17–18 July 2004	2
2003–04	Worlds	San Francisco	Special	1–5 September 2004	7
2005	Pro Tour	Atlanta	Team Limited	11–13 March 2005	1
2005	Invitational	Los Angeles	Special	17–20 May 2005	5
2006	Invitational	Los Angeles	Special	10–12 May 2006	4
2006	Worlds	Paris	Special	29 November–3 December 2006	4
2007	Grand Prix	Amsterdam	Two-Headed Giant	10–11 March 2007	2
2007	Worlds	New York	Special	6–9 December 2007	3
2008	Grand Prix	Brussels	Sealed and Booster Draft	3–4 May 2008	2
2009	Pro Tour	Kyoto	Standard and Booster Draft	27 February–1 March 2009	1
2009	Grand Prix	Chicago	Legacy	7–8 March 2009	1
2009	Grand Prix	Tampa	Sealed and Booster Draft	24–25 October 2009	5
2018	Grand Prix	Lille	Standard	26–28 October 2018	2

Last updated: 26 October 2009
Source: Event Coverage at Wizards.com

Other accomplishments

- Pro Tour Player of the Year 2003–04
- Three-time player at the Magic Invitational

Preceded by (Germany) Kai Budde	Pro Player of the Year; 2003–04	Succeeded by (Japan) Kenji Tsumura

== Poker ==
Nassif has had 30 cashes at the World Series of Poker, including back-to-back cashes at the 2010 and 2011 main events, finishing 73rd and 189th respectively. As of 2023, Nassif's live tournament earnings exceed $1,100,000.
