= List of Magic: The Gathering Grand Prix events =

This is a list of all Grand Prix tournaments, which have been held for the Magic: The Gathering game. Until their cancellation, 702 Grand Prix events were held, two of them as online-only events on MTG Arena. From the beginning of 2019, Grand Prix events became a part of a larger event, named MagicFests. Due to the global COVID-19 pandemic, Grand Prix events were cancelled in 2020. Due to, during the pandemic years, Wizards of the Coast deciding to move the marketing and focus of the game away from competitive play towards the much larger 'casual', often multiplayer-focused audience, Grand Prix events have not returned.

However, on 20 August 2024, Wizards of the Coast announced a new tournament series called Magic Spotlight Series, starting in 2025. They are open events with a $50,000 prize pool, also rewarding the top 8 finishers with a Pro Tour invitation, so they can be seen as spiritual successors for the Grand Prix series.

== List of Grand Prix ==
Key

*	Modified Standard without the Visions set
n/a	First day competition was split into two groups
n/a	First day competition was split into three groups
n/a	First day competition was split into four groups
n/a	Competition was split into two separate events with 4 groups each
n/a	First day competition was split into four separate events, and players could participate more than once
n/a	First 8 or 9 rounds of competition were split into two separate events, and players could participate in both

Season	Location	Format	Date	Winner	Players
1996–97	Amsterdam	Standard *	22–23 March 1997	(France) Emmanuel Vernay	330
1996–97	Washington, D.C.	Limited	26–27 April 1997	(United States) Mike Long	404
1996–97	Tokyo	Limited	4–5 May 1997	(Japan) Kenichi Fujita	825
1996–97	Barcelona	Limited	4–5 May 1997	(France) Pierre Fayard	306
1996–97	London	Standard	12–13 July 1997	(France) Michael Sochon	398
1997–98	Toronto	Block Constructed	30–31 August 1997	(United States) Brian Kibler	169
1997–98	Copenhagen	Block Constructed	6–7 September 1997	(Denmark) Karsten Hoppe	278
1997–98	Como	Limited	8–9 November 1997	(France) Michael Debard	215
1997–98	San Francisco	Extended	6–7 December 1997	(United States) Robert Swarowski	205
1997–98	Madrid	Extended	24–25 January 1998	(United States) Steven O'Mahoney-Schwartz	311
1997–98	Rio de Janeiro	Extended	31 January – 1 February 1998	(United States) Jon Finkel	491
1997–98	Lyon	Extended	7–8 February 1998	(France) Raphaël Lévy	461
1997–98	Melbourne	Limited	14–15 February 1998	(Australia) Philip Davey	140
1997–98	Stockholm	Limited	21–22 March 1998	(Sweden) Olle Råde	282
1997–98	Atlanta	Limited	27–28 March 1998	(United States) Randy Buehler	334
1997–98	Antwerp	Limited	25–26 April 1998	(Germany) Stephan Valkyser	331
1997–98	Zürich	Limited	30–31 May 1998	(United States) Steven O'Mahoney Schwartz	357
1997–98	Indianapolis	Limited	27–28 June 1998	(United States) Eric Jordan	310
1998–99	Boston	Block Constructed	5–6 September 1998	(United States) Jon Finkel	314
1998–99	Lisbon	Block Constructed	12–13 September 1998	(Portugal) Bruno Cardoso	544
1998–99	Austin	Block Constructed	10–11 October 1998	(Canada) Gary Krakower	213
1998–99	Birmingham	Block Constructed	17–18 October 1998	(United Kingdom) Craig Jones	346
1998–99	Manila	Limited	12–13 December 1998	(Japan) Toshiki Tsukamoto	647
1998–99	Kyoto	Limited	16–17 January 1999	(Japan) Yoshikazu Ishii	375
1998–99	San Francisco	Limited	23–24 January 1999	(United States) Richard Van Cleave	324
1998–99	Barcelona	Limited	6–7 February 1999	(Germany) Kai Budde	407
1998–99	Vienna	Extended	13–14 March 1999	(Germany) Kai Budde	367
1998–99	Kansas City	Extended	27–28 March 1999	(United States) Mark Gordon	458
1998–99	Oslo	Limited	10–11 April 1999	(Germany) Jim Herold	346
1998–99	Taipei	Limited	24–25 April 1999	(Japan) Kenichi Fujita	194
1998–99	Amsterdam	Limited	15–16 May 1999	(Germany) Kai Budde	600
1998–99	Washington, D.C.	Limited	19–20 June 1999	(United States) Ben Farkas	434
1999–00	Tohoku	Limited	11–12 September 1999	(Japan) Masayuki Higashino	377
1999–00	Memphis	Block Constructed	18–19 September 1999	(United States) Michael Pustilnik	355
1999–00	Lisbon	Block Constructed	25–26 September 1999	(Portugal) Helder Coelho	765
1999–00	Kyushu	Block Constructed	30–31 October 1999	(Japan) Tadayoshi Komiya	456
1999–00	São Paulo	Limited	6–7 November 1999	(Brazil) Rafael Assafi Alvarenga	291
1999–00	Milan	Block Constructed	6–7 November 1999	(Slovenia) Ziga Fritz	476
1999–00	San Diego	Limited	20–21 November 1999	(United States) William Jensen	308
1999–00	Tours	Limited	27–28 November 1999	(United States) Alex Shvartsman	474
1999–00	Manila	Limited	4–5 December 1999	(Philippines) Christopher Parreña	509
1999–00	Seattle	Extended	15–16 January 2000	(United States) Bob Maher, Jr.	296
1999–00	Madrid	Extended	29–30 January 2000	(Spain) Carlos Barrado	332
1999–00	Taipei	Extended	12–13 February 2000	(Japan) Tadayoshi Komiya	409
1999–00	Philadelphia	Extended	19–20 February 2000	(Denmark) Trey Van Cleave	582
1999–00	Cannes	Team Limited	26–27 February 2000	(France) Florent Jeudon (France) Antoine Ruel (France) Olivier Ruel	291 (97 teams)
1999–00	Kuala Lumpur	Extended	4–5 March 2000	(Malaysia) Ryan Soh	295
1999–00	Frankfurt	Team Limited	8–9 April 2000	(Germany) Jim Herold (Germany) Sebastian Moises (Germany) Gunnar Refsdal	582 (194 teams)
1999–00	Nagoya	Team Limited	22–23 April 2000	(United States) Alex Shvartsman (United States) Trevor Blackwell (Singapore) Nick Wong	651 (217 teams)
1999–00	St. Louis	Team Limited	13–14 May 2000	(United States) Daniel O'Mahoney Schwartz (United States) Jon Finkel (United States) Steven O'Mahoney-Schwartz	204 (68 teams)
1999–00	Copenhagen	Limited	17–18 June 2000	(Denmark) Niels Jensen	383
1999–00	Pittsburgh	Team Limited	24–25 June 2000	(United States) Ben Rubin (United States) William Jensen (United States) Casey McCarrel	234 (78 teams)
2000–01	Porto	Limited	23–24 September 2000	(France) Antoine Ruel	672
2000–01	Sapporo	Limited	23–24 September 2000	(Japan) Satoshi Nakamura	267
2000–01	Manchester	Limited	7–8 October 2000	(United States) Darwin Kastle	247
2000–01	Helsinki	Limited	28–29 October 2000	(Netherlands) Noah Boeken	367
2000–01	Dallas	Limited	28–29 October 2000	(Canada) Matthew Vienneau	312
2000–01	Kyoto	Extended	11–12 November 2000	(Japan) Tsuyoshi Fujita	726
2000–01	Phoenix	Extended	11–12 November 2000	(United States) Sean Fitzgerald	206
2000–01	Sydney	Extended	18–19 November 2000	(New Zealand) Gordon Lin	194
2000–01	Florence	Extended	25–26 November 2000	(Austria) Benedikt Klauser	579
2000–01	Buenos Aires	Extended	25–26 November 2000	(Mexico) Hugo Araiza	314
2000–01	Singapore	Extended	9–10 December 2000	(Singapore) Sam Lau	206
2000–01	New Orleans	Limited	6–7 January 2001	(United States) Bill Stead	434
2000–01	Amsterdam	Limited	13–14 January 2001	(United States) Chris Benafel	642
2000–01	Hiroshima	Limited	27–28 January 2001	(Japan) Masayuki Higashino	444
2000–01	Kaohsiung	Limited	10–11 February 2001	(Taiwan) Tobey Tamber	207
2000–01	Valencia	Limited	10–11 February 2001	(Spain) Ricard Tuduri	417
2000–01	Cologne	Limited	24–25 February 2001	(Germany) Jim Herold	546
2000–01	Boston	Limited	24–25 February 2001	(United States) Tom Swan	590
2000–01	Prague	Limited	10–11 March 2001	(Canada) Ryan Fuller	617
2000–01	Rio de Janeiro	Limited	10–11 March 2001	(Brazil) Carlos Romão	343
2000–01	Gothenburg	Limited	24–25 March 2001	(Netherlands) Jos Schreurs	459
2000–01	Detroit	Limited	31 March – 1 April 2001	(Canada) Matthew Vienneau	641
2000–01	Moscow	Block Constructed	21–22 April 2001	(Canada) Ryan Fuller	241
2000–01	Yokohama	Team Limited	12–13 May 2001	(United States) Chris Benafel (Canada) Ryan Fuller (United States) David Williams	846 (282 teams)
2000–01	Turin	Team Limited	26–27 May 2001	(United States) Peter Szigeti (United States) Brock Parker (United States) Daniel Clegg	303 (101 teams)
2000–01	Taipei	Team Limited	21–22 July 2001	(United States) David Williams (United States) Chris Benafel (United States) Daniel Clegg	255 (85 teams)
2000–01	Columbus	Team Limited	28–29 July 2001	(United States) Darwin Kastle (United States) Dave Humpherys (United States) Rob Dougherty	489 (163 teams)
2001–02	Kobe	Block Constructed	18–19 August 2001	(Japan) Itaru Ishida	1350
2001–02	Denver	Block Constructed	18–19 August 2001	(United States) Brett Shears	402
2001–02	Santiago	Block Constructed	25–26 August 2001	(Argentina) Matias Gabrenja	303
2001–02	Singapore	Block Constructed	1–2 September 2001	(Singapore) Albertus Hui Chin Law	266
2001–02	London	Block Constructed	1–2 September 2001	(Germany) Kai Budde	551
2001–02	Warsaw	Block Constructed	8–9 September 2001	(Sweden) Rickard Österberg	401
2001–02	Oslo	Block Constructed	22–23 September 2001	(Denmark) Trey Van Cleave	302
2001–02	Minneapolis	Block Constructed	29–30 September 2001	(United States) Dave Humpherys	409
2001–02	Vienna	Limited	6–7 October 2001	(Germany) Stephan Meyer	680
2001–02	Cape Town	Limited	6–7 October 2001	(Australia) Ben Seck	171
2001–02	Shizuoka	Limited	13–14 October 2001	(Japan) Kohei Yamada	705
2001–02	Montreal	Limited	13–14 October 2001	(United States) Mike Turian	279
2001–02	Brisbane	Limited	20–21 October 2001	(Australia) Richard Johnston	195
2001–02	Hong Kong	Limited	17–18 November 2001	(Canada) Jeff Fung	184
2001–02	Atlanta	Limited	17–18 November 2001	(United States) Eugene Harvey	377
2001–02	Biarritz	Limited	24–25 November 2001	(France) Nicolas Labarre	525
2001–02	Curitiba	Extended	8–9 December 2001	(Brazil) Guilherme Svaldi	330
2001–02	Las Vegas	Extended	8–9 December 2001	(United States) Michael Pustilnik	462
2001–02	Sendai	Extended	15–16 December 2001	(Japan) Kazuaki Arahori	427
2001–02	Houston	Extended	5–6 January 2002	(United States) Joshua Smith	272
2001–02	Lisbon	Extended	19–20 January 2002	(Germany) Kai Budde	668
2001–02	Heidelberg	Limited	9–10 February 2002	(Netherlands) Kamiel Cornelissen	880
2001–02	Fukuoka	Limited	16–17 February 2002	(United States) Alex Shvartsman	428
2001–02	Tampa	Limited	23–24 February 2002	(United States) Sol Malka	410
2001–02	Antwerp	Limited	2–3 March 2002	(Germany) Kai Budde	614
2001–02	Barcelona	Limited	23–24 March 2002	(Netherlands) Noah Boeken	700
2001–02	Kuala Lumpur	Limited	30–31 March 2002	(Singapore) Ding Yuan Leong	237
2001–02	Naples	Limited	6–7 April 2002	(France) Pierre Malherbaud	296
2001–02	Nagoya	Team Limited	11–12 May 2002	(Japan) Masashiro Kuroda (Japan) Katsuhiro Mori (Japan) Masahiko Morita	576 (192 teams)
2001–02	Milwaukee	Standard	11–12 May 2002	(United States) Eric Taylor	652
2001–02	New Jersey	Team Limited	29–30 June 2002	(United States) Eric James (United States) Kyle Rose (United States) Norman Woods	603 (201 teams)
2001–02	São Paulo	Standard	13–14 July 2002	(Argentina) Gabriel Caligaris	344
2001–02	Taipei	Standard	13–14 July 2002	(Taiwan) Sheng Hsun Hsia	209
2002–03	Sapporo	Block Constructed	24–25 August 2002	(Japan) Shinichi Kumagai	467
2002–03	London	Block Constructed	31 August – 1 September 2002	(Czech Republic) Jakub Šlemr	683
2002–03	Cleveland	Block Constructed	7–8 September 2002	(United States) Valentin Moskovich	607
2002–03	Hamburg	Block Constructed	28–29 September 2002	(Germany) Simon Hockwin	582
2002–03	Utsunomiya	Limited	12–13 October 2002	(Japan) Rei Hashimoto	682
2002–03	Copenhagen	Limited	12–13 October 2002	(United States) Bob Maher, Jr.	507
2002–03	Philadelphia	Limited	26–27 October 2002	(Canada) Jeff Cunningham	592
2002–03	Melbourne	Limited	23–24 November 2002	(Australia) Ben Seck	180
2002–03	Los Angeles	Limited	23–24 November 2002	(United States) Philip Freneau	480
2002–03	Reims	Extended	30 November – 1 December 2002	(Germany) Alex Mack	833
2002–03	New Orleans	Extended	4–5 January 2003	(United States) Zvi Mowshowitz	386
2002–03	Hiroshima	Extended	25–26 January 2003	(Japan) Motokiyo Azuma	399
2002–03	Sevilla	Limited	22–23 February 2003	(Sweden) Anton Jonsson	816
2002–03	Boston	Limited	22–23 February 2003	(United States) Brian Kibler	611
2002–03	Kyoto	Limited	29–30 March 2003	(Japan) Akira Asahara	680
2002–03	Singapore	Limited	29–30 March 2003	(Sweden) Mikael Polgary	239
2002–03	Prague	Limited	12–13 April 2003	(Austria) Stefan Jedlicka	951
2002–03	Pittsburgh	Team Limited	31 May – 1 June 2003	(United States) Justin Gary (United States) Zvi Mowshowitz (United States) Alex Shvartsman	585 (195 teams)
2002–03	Amsterdam	Team Limited	7–8 June 2003	(France) Wilfried Ranque (Brazil) Carlos Romão (Argentina) Jose Barbero	594 (198 teams)
2002–03	Bangkok	Standard	12–13 July 2003	(Japan) Tsuyoshi Fujita	257
2002–03	Detroit	Block Constructed	12–13 July 2003	(United States) Bob Maher, Jr.	604
2003–04	Yokohama	Block Constructed	23–24 August 2003	(Japan) Shu Komuro	810
2003–04	London	Block Constructed	23–24 August 2003	(Argentina) Diego Ostrovich	523
2003–04	Atlanta	Standard	30–31 August 2003	(Germany) Marco Blume	588
2003–04	Genoa	Block Constructed	13–14 September 2003	(Germany) Reinhard Blech	585
2003–04	Sydney	Limited	4–5 October 2003	(Australia) Andrew Grain	274
2003–04	Kansas City	Limited	18–19 October 2003	(United States) Antonino De Rosa	500
2003–04	Lyon	Limited	25–26 October 2003	(France) Yann Hamon	1016
2003–04	Shizuoka	Limited	8–9 November 2003	(Japan) Kazuki Katou	653
2003–04	Gothenburg	Limited	22–23 November 2003	(Netherlands) Jelger Wiegersma	461
2003–04	Munich	Limited	6–7 December 2003	(France) Yann Hamon	1051
2003–04	Anaheim	Extended	13–14 December 2003	(United States) Ben Rubin	273
2003–04	Okayama	Extended	24–25 January 2004	(Japan) Kazumasa Shiki	401
2003–04	Oakland	Limited	7–8 February 2004	(United States) Ken Ho	446
2003–04	Madrid	Limited	21–22 February 2004	(Germany) Kai Budde	1351
2003–04	Hong Kong	Limited	6–7 March 2004	(Malaysia) Chuen Hwa Tan	250
2003–04	Sendai	Limited	20–21 March 2004	(Japan) Ichiro Shimura	531
2003–04	Columbus	Limited	27–28 March 2004	(United States) Mike Turian	854
2003–04	Birmingham	Limited	27–28 March 2004	(Austria) Stefan Jedlicka	579
2003–04	Washington, D.C.	Team Limited	17–18 April 2004	(United States) Chris Fennel (United States) Bill Stead (United States) Charles Gindy	573 (191 teams)
2003–04	Bochum	Team Limited	17–18 April 2004	(Netherlands) Stijn Cornelissen (Netherlands) Tom van de Logt (Netherlands) Jesse Cornelissen	639 (213 teams)
2003–04	Brussels	Standard	29–30 May 2004	(Germany) Tobias Henke	736
2003–04	Zürich	Block Constructed	26–27 June 2004	(Switzerland) Manuel Bucher	640
2003–04	Kuala Lumpur	Standard	24–25 July 2004	(Japan) Masahiko Morita	262
2003–04	Orlando	Block Constructed	24–25 July 2004	(United States) Osyp Lebedowicz	500
2003–04	New Jersey	Block Constructed	14–15 August 2004	(United States) Jeff Garza	958
2003–04	Nagoya	Standard	28–29 August 2004	(Japan) Tatsunori Kishi	941
2004–05	Rimini	Block Constructed	10–11 September 2004	(Italy) Domingo Ottati	750
2004–05	Vienna	Limited	9–10 October 2004	(Austria) Nikolaus Eigner	978
2004–05	Austin	Limited	9–10 October 2004	(United States) Jonathan Sonne	386
2004–05	Helsinki	Limited	6–7 November 2004	(France) Olivier Ruel	455
2004–05	Brisbane	Limited	13–14 November 2004	(Australia) Will Copeman	222
2004–05	Yokohama	Limited	20–21 November 2004	(Japan) Kazuki Katou	707
2004–05	Porto Alegre	Limited	20–21 November 2004	(Argentina) Jose Barbero	343
2004–05	Paris	Limited	20–21 November 2004	(Netherlands) Wilco Pinkster	1592
2004–05	Chicago	Team Limited	18–19 December 2004	(United States) Timothy Aten (United States) Gadiel Szleifer (United States) John Pelcak	474 (158 teams)
2004–05	Osaka	Team Limited	8–9 January 2005	(Japan) Masashiro Kuroda (Japan) Katsuhiro Mori (Japan) Masahiko Morita	480 (160 teams)
2004–05	Boston	Extended	5–6 February 2005	(Japan) Masashi Oiso	699
2004–05	Eindhoven	Extended	26–27 February 2005	(France) Sebastien Roux	1010
2004–05	Seattle	Extended	5–6 March 2005	(United States) Ernie Marchesano	390
2004–05	Singapore	Extended	19–20 March 2005	(Japan) Itaru Ishida	373
2004–05	Leipzig	Limited	26–27 March 2005	(Russia) Rustam Bakirov	897
2004–05	Lisbon	Limited	23–24 April 2005	(Portugal) Marcio Carvalho	1169
2004–05	Detroit	Limited	23–24 April 2005	(United States) Jordan Berkowitz	491
2004–05	Matsuyama	Limited	14–15 May 2005	(Japan) Akira Asahara	419
2004–05	Bologna	Limited	11–12 June 2005	(France) Olivier Ruel	654
2004–05	Minneapolis	Block Constructed	16–17 July 2005	(United States) Alex Lieberman	404
2004–05	Niigata	Block Constructed	23–24 July 2005	(Japan) Katsuhiro Mori	476
2004–05	Taipei	Block Constructed	6–7 August 2005	(Japan) Osamu Fujita	261
2004–05	Salt Lake City	Block Constructed	27–28 August 2005	(United States) Antonino De Rosa	250
2004–05	Mexico City	Block Constructed	3–4 September 2005	(Netherlands) Julien Nuijten	305
2004–05	Nottingham	Limited	3–4 September 2005	(Czech Republic) Nikola Vávra	560
2004–05	Melbourne	Extended	5–6 November 2005	(Australia) James Zhang	140
2004–05	Copenhagen	Extended	5–6 November 2005	(Netherlands) Julien Nuijten	340
2004–05	Kitakyushu	Extended	5–6 November 2005	(Japan) Tomohiro Kaji	272
2004–05	Philadelphia	Legacy	12–13 November 2005	(United States) Jonathan Sonne	495
2004–05	Bilbao	Extended	19–20 November 2005	(France) Olivier Ruel	935
2004–05	Beijing	Extended	26–27 November 2005	(China) Dong Zhong	159
2006	Lille	Legacy	18–19 December 2005	(Austria) Helmut Summersberger	938
2006	Charlotte	Extended	18–19 December 2005	(United States) Michael Krumb	456
2006	Hasselt	Limited	28–29 January 2006	(United Kingdom) Sam Gomersall	1070
2006	Richmond	Limited	4–5 February 2006	(Canada) Richard Hoaen	559
2006	Dortmund	Limited	18–19 February 2006	(Germany) David Brucker	1029
2006	Manila	Limited	18–19 March 2006	(Philippines) James Porter	368
2006	Cardiff	Limited	25–26 March 2006	(United Kingdom) Martin Dingler	370
2006	Madison	Team Standard	25–26 March 2006	(United States) Brian Ziegler (United States) Tim Bulgery (Japan) Takanobu Sato	456 (152 teams)
2006	Hamamatsu	Team Standard	8–9 April 2006	(Japan) Kotatsu Saitou (Japan) Takahiro Katayama (Japan) Yuusuke Tanii	495 (165 teams)
2006	Barcelona	Limited	8–9 April 2006	(Austria) Helmut Summersberger	1207
2006	Turin	Limited	3–4 June 2006	(Switzerland) Nico Bohny	656
2006	Toronto	Limited	3–4 June 2006	(United States) Antonino De Rosa	506
2006	Kuala Lumpur	Limited	3–4 June 2006	(Japan) Kenji Tsumura	316
2006	Toulouse	Limited	24–25 June 2006	(Japan) Kenji Tsumura	674
2006	St. Louis	Limited	22–23 July 2006	(Japan) Shuhei Nakamura	466
2006	Malmö	Limited	22–23 July 2006	(Netherlands) Wessel Oomens	539
2006	Hiroshima	Limited	19–20 August 2006	(Japan) Shuhei Nakamura	417
2006	Phoenix	Limited	2–3 September 2006	(Brazil) Carlos Romão	387
2006	Sydney	Limited	7–8 October 2006	(Australia) James Zhang	213
2006	Athens	Limited	14–15 October 2006	(Germany) Sebastian Aljiaj	470
2006	New Jersey	Limited	11–12 November 2006	(Canada) Guillaume Cardin	915
2006	Yamagata	Limited	18–19 November 2006	(Japan) Takahiro Suzuki	359
2007	Dallas	Extended	24–25 February 2007	(France) Raphaël Lévy	747
2007	Singapore	Extended	3–4 March 2007	(France) Raphaël Lévy	332
2007	Amsterdam	Two-Headed Giant Limited	10–11 March 2007	(Slovakia) Michael Havlik (Slovakia) Richard Hornansky	1336
2007	Kyoto	Standard	17–18 March 2007	(Japan) Yuuya Watanabe	859
2007	Massachusetts	Two-Headed Giant Limited	31 March – 1 April 2007	(United States) Matt Wang (United States) Steven O'Mahoney-Schwartz	690
2007	Stockholm	Limited	5–6 May 2007	(Russia) Nicolay Potovin	713
2007	Columbus	Legacy	19–20 May 2007	(United States) Steven Sadin	883
2007	Strasbourg	Block Constructed	19–20 May 2007	(Japan) Tomoharu Saitou	1155
2007	Montreal	Block Constructed	23–24 June 2007	(Brazil) Celso Zampere, Jr.	740
2007	San Francisco	Block Constructed	25–26 August 2007	(United States) Luis Scott-Vargas	672
2007	Florence	Block Constructed	8–9 September 2007	(Japan) Masami Kaneko	1082
2007	Brisbane	Limited	20–21 October 2007	(Australia) Anatoli Lightfoot	233
2007	Bangkok	Limited	27–28 October 2007	(Japan) Masahiko Morita	314
2007	Kraków	Standard	3–4 November 2007	(United States) Paul Cheon	848
2007	Kitakyushu	Limited	10–11 November 2007	(Japan) Jun'ya Iyanaga	354
2007	Daytona Beach	Limited	17–18 November 2007	(United States) Seth Manfield	636
2008	Stuttgart	Limited	15–16 December 2007	(Japan) Shuhei Nakamura	1336
2008	Vancouver	Extended	23–24 February 2008	(United States) Paul Cheon	395
2008	Shizuoka	Standard	8–9 March 2008	(Japan) Yuuta Takahashi	827
2008	Vienna	Extended	15–16 March 2008	(Poland) Mateusz Kopeć	1151
2008	Philadelphia	Extended	15–16 March 2008	(United States) Gerard Fabiano	969
2008	Brussels	Limited	3–4 May 2008	(Netherlands) Kamiel Cornelissen	1470
2008	Birmingham	Block Constructed	31 May – 1 June 2008	(Hong Kong) Shi Tian Lee	581
2008	Indianapolis	Limited	21–22 June 2008	(Netherlands) Jelger Wiegersma	1124
2008	Buenos Aires	Standard	28–29 June 2008	(Brazil) Franscico Braga	580
2008	Madrid	Limited	26–27 July 2008	(Denmark) Lasse Nørgaard	1465
2008	Kobe	Block Constructed	2–3 August 2008	(Japan) Yuuta Takahashi	811
2008	Denver	Block Constructed	9–10 August 2008	(United States) Gerry Thompson	625
2008	Copenhagen	Standard	23–24 August 2008	(Sweden) David Larsson	610
2008	Manila	Block Constructed	30–31 August 2008	(Japan) Hironobu Sugaya	641
2008	Rimini	Block Constructed	13–14 September 2008	(Italy) Emanuele Giusti	686
2008	Kansas City	Limited	18–19 October 2008	(United States) Tim Landale	746
2008	Paris	Limited	18–19 October 2008	(Netherlands) Arjan van Leeuwen	1838
2008	Atlanta	Limited	15–16 November 2008	(United States) Luis Scott-Vargas	684
2008	Okayama	Limited	22–23 November 2008	(Japan) Makihito Mihara	635
2008	Taipei	Limited	29–30 November 2008	(Japan) Shuu Komuro	270
2008	Auckland	Limited	6–7 December 2008	(Australia) Dominic Lo	254
2009	Los Angeles	Extended	17–18 January 2009	(United States) Luis Scott-Vargas	834
2009	Rotterdam	Limited	21–22 February 2009	(Netherlands) Arjan van Leeuwen	1227
2009	Chicago	Legacy	7–8 March 2009	(France) Gabriel Nassif	1230
2009	Hanover	Extended	14–15 March 2009	(Germany) Lino Burgold	925
2009	Singapore	Extended	21–22 March 2009	(Japan) Tomoharu Saitou	370
2009	Kobe	Extended	18–19 April 2009	(Japan) Tomoharu Saitou	545
2009	Barcelona	Standard	23–24 May 2009	(Spain) Joel Calafell	1495
2009	Seattle	Standard	30–31 May 2009	(France) Yann Massicard	1127
2009	São Paulo	Standard	13–14 June 2009	(Brazil) Daniel Almeida Alves	639
2009	Boston	Limited	1–2 August 2009	(United States) Marlon Egolf	1503
2009	Brighton	Limited	8–9 August 2009	(France) Olivier Ruel	760
2009	Bangkok	Limited	22–23 August 2009	(Japan) Shingou Kurihara	414
2009	Niigata	Limited	29–30 August 2009	(Japan) Tsuyoshi Ikeda	722
2009	Prague	Limited	5–6 September 2009	(Germany) Jan Schmidt	1543
2009	Melbourne	Limited	10–11 October 2009	(Japan) Yuuya Watanabe	416
2009	Tampa	Limited	24–25 October 2009	(United States) (Lithuania) Gaudenis Vidugiris	832
2009	Kitakyushu	Limited	31 October – 1 November 2009	(Japan) Taisuke Ishii	501
2009	Paris	Limited	7–8 November 2009	(Germany) Adrian Rosada	1961
2009	Minneapolis	Limited	14–15 November 2009	(United States) Zohar Bhagat	1187
2010	Oakland	Extended	13–14 February 2010	(United States) Matthew Nass	770
2010	Madrid	Legacy	27–28 February 2010	(Germany) Andreas Müller	2228
2010	Kuala Lumpur	Standard	13–14 March 2010	(Singapore) Ding Yuan Leong	518
2010	Yokohama	Extended	20–21 March 2010	(Japan) Katsuhiro Mori	1123
2010	Brussels	Standard	27–28 March 2010	(Italy) Emanuele Giusti	1667
2010	Houston	Extended	3–4 April 2010	(United States) Adam Yurchick	662
2010	Lyon	Limited	8–9 May 2010	(Germany) Florian Koch	1425
2010	Washington, D.C.	Standard	22–23 May 2010	(United States) Brad Nelson	1932
2010	Sendai	Standard	5–6 June 2010	(United States) Brian Kibler	907
2010	Manila	Standard	12–13 June 2010	(Japan) Naoki Nakada	1071
2010	Columbus	Legacy	31 July – 1 August 2010	(Japan) Tomoharu Saitou	1296
2010	Gothenburg	Limited	28–29 August 2010	(Sweden) Kenny Öberg	1001
2010	Portland	Limited	11–12 September 2010	(Czech Republic) Martin Jůza	1370
2010	Sydney	Limited	9–10 October 2010	(Australia) Jeremy Neeman	434
2010	Toronto	Limited	23–24 October 2010	(Canada) Jonathan Smithers	1361
2010	Bochum	Limited	30–31 October 2010	(Czech Republic) Martin Jůza	1814
2010	Nashville	Limited	20–21 November 2010	(United States) Gerry Thompson	1481
2010	Florence	Limited	27–28 November 2010	(Italy) Pierluigi Aceto	1291
2011	Atlanta	Extended	22–23 January 2011	(United States) Jason Ford	1213
2011	Paris	Limited	12–13 February 2011	(United States) David Sharfman	2182
2011	Denver	Limited	19–20 February 2011	(United States) (Lithuania) Gaudenis Vidugiris	841
2011	Barcelona	Standard	26–27 March 2011	(Spain) Martin Scheinin	1201
2011	Dallas	Standard	9–10 April 2011	(United States) David Shiels	1189
2011	Kobe	Extended	23–24 April 2011	(Japan) Shouta Yasooka	711
2011	London	Limited	30 April – 1 May 2011	(United Kingdom) Daniel Royde	709
2011	Prague	Limited	21–22 May 2011	(Czech Republic) Ondrej Baudys	1236
2011	Providence	Legacy	28–29 May 2011	(United States) James Rynkiewicz	1179
2011	Singapore	Standard	4–5 June 2011	(Brazil) Paulo Vitor Damo da Rosa	623
2011	Kansas City	Limited	18–19 June 2011	(United States) Luis Scott-Vargas	879
2011	Shanghai	Limited	20–21 August 2011	(Japan) Yuuya Watanabe	633
2011	Pittsburgh	Standard	27–28 August 2011	(Japan) Yuuya Watanabe	1435
2011	Montreal	Limited	17–18 September 2011	(Canada) Richard Hoaen	1054
2011	Milan	Limited	8–9 October 2011	(Italy) Marco Ricci	1790
2011	Brisbane	Standard	15–16 October 2011	(Australia) Jeremy Neeman	389
2011	Amsterdam	Legacy	22–23 October 2011	(France) Pierre Sommen	1878
2011	Santiago	Limited	22–23 October 2011	(Brazil) Igor Silva Pinto	737
2011	Hiroshima	Standard	29–30 October 2011	(Czech Republic) Martin Jůza	796
2011	San Diego	Limited	12–13 November 2011	(United States) (Israel) Shahar Shenhar	1045
2012	Austin	Limited	7–8 January 2012	(France) Raphaël Lévy	1044
2012	Orlando	Standard	14–15 January 2012	(United States) Conley Woods	926
2012	Kobe	Limited	18–19 February 2012	(Japan) Masahiro Hiraga	1117
2012	Lincoln	Modern	18–19 February 2012	(United States) Bronson Magnan	716
2012	Madrid	Limited	25–26 February 2012	(Switzerland) Ivo Grossholz	1314
2012	Baltimore	Standard	25–26 February 2012	(United States) Matthew Costa	1545
2012	Lille	Standard	3–4 March 2012	(United Kingdom) Richard Parker	1505
2012	Seattle	Limited	3–4 March 2012	(Canada) Robert Smith	1161
2012	Indianapolis	Legacy	10–11 March 2012	(United States) Tom Martell	1214
2012	Nashville	Limited	17–18 March 2012	(United States) Reid Duke	1037
2012	Kuala Lumpur	Standard	24–25 March 2012	(Japan) Yuuya Watanabe	612
2012	Mexico City	Limited	24–25 March 2012	(United States) Paul Rietzl	685
2012	Melbourne	Limited	31 March – 1 April 2012	(Australia) David Crewe	558
2012	Salt Lake City	Standard	31 March – 1 April 2012	(United States) (Israel) Shahar Shenhar	1137
2012	Turin	Modern	31 March – 1 April 2012	(United States) Antonino de Rosa	1063
2012	Manchester	Limited	21–22 April 2012	(Belgium) Alexandre Darras	1028
2012–13	Malmö	Limited	19–20 May 2012	(Italy) Matteo Versari	922
2012–13	Minneapolis	Standard	19–20 May 2012	(United States) Christian Calcano	1052
2012–13	Anaheim	Block Constructed	26–27 May 2012	(United States) Marc Lalague	938
2012–13	Manila	Standard	16–17 June 2012	(Japan) Yuuya Watanabe	1108
2012–13	Yokohama	Modern	23–24 June 2012	(Japan) Jun'ichi Miyajima	1523
2012–13	Vancouver	Limited	23–24 June 2012	(United States) David Stroud	849
2012–13	Atlanta	Legacy	30 June – 1 July 2012	(United States) (Lithuania) Gaudenis Vidugiris	905
2012–13	São Paulo	Limited	21–22 July 2012	(Brazil) Reinaldo Gomes da Silva Jr.	737
2012–13	Ghent	Legacy	21–22 July 2012	(Germany) Timo Schünemann	1345
2012–13	Columbus	Modern	21–22 July 2012	(United States) Jacob Maynard	1046
2012–13	Shanghai	Limited	28–29 July 2012	(China) Bo Li	836
2012–13	Boston	Limited	25–26 August 2012	(United States) Brian Demars	1845
2012–13	San José	Limited	15–16 September 2012	(Japan) Shuhei Nakamura	364
2012–13	Moscow	Limited	15–16 September 2012	(Italy) Luca Casadei	869
2012–13	San Jose	Team Limited	13–14 October 2012	(United States) Paul Rietzl (United States) Matt Sperling (United States) David Williams	1713 (571 teams)
2012–13	Philadelphia	Limited	27–28 October 2012	(Japan) Shuhei Nakamura	1987
2012–13	Lyon	Modern	3–4 November 2012	(France) Jérémy Dezani	1326
2012–13	Auckland	Standard	3–4 November 2012	(New Zealand) Walker MacMurdo	264
2012–13	Chicago	Modern	10–11 November 2012	(United States) Jacob Wilson	1115
2012–13	Bochum	Standard	17–18 November 2012	(Czech Republic) Martin Jůza	1731
2012–13	Charleston	Standard	17–18 November 2012	(United States) Jon Bolding	661
2012–13	Taipei	Limited	24–25 November 2012	(Japan) Makihito Mihara	727
2012–13	San Antonio	Standard	24–25 November 2012	(United States) Tyler Lytle	807
2012–13	Lisbon	Limited	1–2 December 2012	(Slovakia) Ivan Floch	1343
2012–13	Toronto	Modern	8–9 December 2012	(Brazil) Willy Edel	1051
2012–13	Nagoya	Standard	8–9 December 2012	(Japan) Yuuji Okita	1689
2012–13	Indianapolis	Limited	22–23 December 2012	(United States) Ben Stark	815
2012–13	Denver	Legacy	5–6 January 2013	(Indonesia) Vidianto Wijaya	700
2012–13	Atlantic City	Standard	12–13 January 2013	(Canada) Jon Stern	1648
2012–13	Singapore	Limited	12–13 January 2013	(Japan) Ken Yukuhiro	894
2012–13	Bilbao	Modern	19–20 January 2013	(Netherlands) Mitchell Manders	988
2012–13	Sydney	Limited	19–20 January 2013	(Australia) Allen Zhang	686
2012–13	London	Limited	9–10 February 2013	(France) Timothée Simonot	1970
2012–13	Quebec City	Standard	23–24 February 2013	(United States) Nico Christiansen	806
2012–13	Charlotte	Limited	23–24 February 2013	(United States) Frank Skarren	2672
2012–13	Yokohama	Limited	2–3 March 2013	(Japan) Masaya Kitayama	2281
2012–13	Verona	Standard	9–10 March 2013	(Ukraine) Mike Krasnitski	1208
2012–13	Rio de Janeiro	Standard	9–10 March 2013	(Brazil) José Francisco da Silva	709
2012–13	San Diego	Modern	16–17 March 2013	(United States) Nathan Holiday	759
2012–13	Utrecht	Team Limited	16–17 March 2013	(Sweden) Fredrik Carlsson (Sweden) Jonathan Bergström (Sweden) Tomas Westling	2031 (677 teams)
2012–13	Pittsburgh	Limited	23–24 March 2013	(United States) Brock Parker	1629
2012–13	Strasbourg	Legacy	13–14 April 2013	(Denmark) Thomas Enevoldsen	1364
2012–13	Portland	Modern	11–12 May 2013	(United States) Sam Pardee	979
2012–13	Beijing	Limited	11–12 May 2013	(China) Quan Zhou	894
2013–14	Guadalajara	Standard	25–26 May 2013	(Mexico) Andres Martinez	462
2013–14	Gothenburg	Limited	8–9 June 2013	(Denmark) Oscar Christensen	1006
2013–14	Providence	Team Limited	8–9 June 2013	(United States) Andrew Longo (United States) Eric Phillipps (United States) Eric Berger	1758 (586 teams)
2013–14	Houston	Limited	15–16 June 2013	(United States) (Israel) Shahar Shenhar	1006
2013–14	Bangkok	Limited	22–23 June 2013	(Indonesia) Patriawan Kurniadi	867
2013–14	Las Vegas	Limited	22–23 June 2013	(United States) Neal Oliver	4492
2013–14	Miami	Standard	29–30 June 2013	(United States) Reid Duke	1257
2013–14	Kansas City	Modern	6–7 July 2013	(United States) Seth Manfield	958
2013–14	Calgary	Standard	27–28 July 2013	(Canada) Alexander Hayne	630
2013–14	Rimini	Limited	27–28 July 2013	(Austria) Christoph Aukenthaler	1037
2013–14	Warsaw	Standard	10–11 August 2013	(Germany) Wenzel Krautmann	984
2013–14	Kitakyushu	Standard	24–25 August 2013	(Malaysia) Raymond Tan	1184
2013–14	Oakland	Limited	24–25 August 2013	(United States) William Jensen	1631
2013–14	Prague	Limited	31 August – 1 September 2013	(Russia) Anatoly Chukhwicov	1508
2013–14	Detroit	Modern	14–15 September 2013	(United States) Josh McClain	1460
2013–14	Brisbane	Modern	5–6 October 2013	(Australia) Justin Robb	466
2013–14	Oklahoma City	Limited	5–6 October 2013	(United States) Pierre-Christophe Mondon	1081
2013–14	Louisville	Standard	19–20 October 2013	(United States) Brian Braun-Duin	1047
2013–14	Hong Kong	Limited	19–20 October 2013	(Japan) Shuhei Nakamura	985
2013–14	Antwerp	Modern	26–27 October 2013	(Germany) Patrick Dickmann	1601
2013–14	Santiago	Standard	2–3 November 2013	(Chile) Luis Navas	731
2013–14	Valencia	Limited	9–10 November 2013	(Switzerland) Samuel Marti	1076
2013–14	Washington, D.C.	Legacy	16–17 November 2013	(United States) Owen Turtenwald	1698
2013–14	Albuquerque	Standard	23–24 November 2013	(United States) Owen Turtenwald	862
2013–14	Kyoto	Team Limited	23–24 November 2013	(Canada) Alexander Hayne (Canada) Richard Hoaen (United States) Michael Hron	1734 (578 teams)
2013–14	Toronto	Limited	30 November – 1 December 2013	(United States) Ari Lax	1603
2013–14	Vienna	Standard	30 November – 1 December 2013	(Poland) Marcin Staciwa	1465
2013–14	Dallas	Standard	6–8 December 2013	(Mexico) Marlon Gutierrez	834
2013–14	Shizuoka	Standard	20–22 December 2013	(Japan) Ryo Nakada	1784
2013–14	Prague	Modern	10–12 January 2014	(Croatia) Vjeran Horvat	1396
2013–14	Sacramento	Limited	17–19 January 2014	(United States) Tom Martell	1855
2013–14	Vancouver	Standard	24–26 January 2014	(Canada) Alexander Hayne	1042
2013–14	Kuala Lumpur	Limited	24–26 January 2014	(Singapore) Fabien Li	1007
2013–14	Paris	Legacy	14–16 February 2014	(Spain) Javier Dominguez	1587
2013–14	Mexico City	Limited	14–16 February 2014	(United States) Marc Lalague	701
2013–14	Barcelona	Team Limited	28 February – 2 March 2014	(Germany) Christian Seibold (Germany) Tobias Gräfensteiner (Germany) Daniel Gräfensteiner	1617 (539 teams)
2013–14	Melbourne	Standard	28 February – 2 March 2014	(South Korea) Sung-wook Nam	902
2013–14	Richmond	Modern	7–9 March 2014	(Canada) Brian Liu	4303
2013–14	Montreal	Limited	14–16 March 2014	(United States) Gerard Fabiano	1622
2013–14	Buenos Aires	Standard	14–16 March 2014	(Brazil) Philippe Monlevade	882
2013–14	Cincinnati	Standard	21–23 March 2014	(United States) Kyle Boggemes	1734
2013–14	Vienna	Limited	21–23 March 2014	(Spain) Aniol Alcaraz	1205
2013–14	Beijing	Standard	28–30 March 2014	(Japan) Yuuya Watanabe	1064
2013–14	Phoenix	Standard	4–6 April 2014	(United States) Robert Berni	1461
2013–14	Philadelphia	Limited	11–13 April 2014	(United States) Frank Skarren	1923
2013–14	Nagoya	Limited	11–13 April 2014	(Japan) Ryousuke Kasuga	1786
2013–14	Minneapolis	Modern	9–11 May 2014	(South Korea) Jun-young Park	1691
2013–14	Warsaw	Limited	9–11 May 2014	(Venezuela) Fabrizio Anteri	1002
2013–14	Atlanta	Limited	23–25 May 2014	(Canada) Jon Stern	1298
2013–14	Manchester	Block Constructed	30 May – 1 June 2014	(Venezuela) Fabrizio Anteri	1403
2013–14	São Paulo	Team Limited	30 May – 1 June 2014	(Brazil) Tulio Jaudy (Brazil) Guilherme Merjan (Brazil) Carlos dos Santos Esteves	945 (315 teams)
2013–14	Moscow	Standard	13–15 June 2014	(Russia) Igor Gorbunov	532
2013–14	Chicago	Standard	20–22 June 2014	(Canada) Tyler Blum	2041
2013–14	Washington, D.C.	Limited	27–29 June 2014	(United States) Mike Sigrist	1424
2013–14	Milan	Limited	27–29 June 2014	(France) Jérémy Dezani	1147
2013–14	Boston-Worcester	Modern	25–27 July 2014	(Slovenia) Robin Dolar	2460
2013–14	Taipei	Limited	25–27 July 2014	(Taiwan) Hao-Shan Huang	852
2014–15	Portland	Team Limited	8–10 August 2014	(United States) Owen Turtenwald (United States) William Jensen (United States) Reid Duke	1947 (649 teams)
2014–15	Utrecht	Standard	8–10 August 2014	(Austria) Oliver Polak-Rottmann	1509
2014–15	Sydney	Limited	22–24 August 2014	(Australia) Paul Jackson	813
2014–15	Kobe	Modern	22–24 August 2014	(Japan) Teruya Kakumae	2270
2014–15	Salt Lake City	Limited	5–7 September 2014	(United States) Brandon Nelson	893
2014–15	Orlando	Limited	3–5 October 2014	(United States) Eugene Hwang	2277
2014–15	Shanghai	Limited	3–5 October 2014	(China) Yu Yin	1192
2014–15	Los Angeles	Standard	17–19 October 2014	(United States) Daniel Scheid	1766
2014–15	Stockholm	Standard	24–26 October 2014	(Slovakia) Matej Zatlkaj	1043
2014–15	Nashville	Team Limited	31 October – 2 November 2014	(United States) Matthew Nass (United States) Jesse Hampton (United States) Jacob Wilson	1392 (464 teams)
2014–15	Santiago	Standard	31 October – 2 November 2014	(Brazil) Eduardo dos Santos Vieira	660
2014–15	New Jersey	Legacy	14–16 November 2014	(United States) Brian Braun-Duin	4003
2014–15	Madrid	Modern	14–16 November 2014	(Austria) Immanuel Gerschenson	1900
2014–15	Ottawa	Limited	21–23 November 2014	(United States) Seth Manfield	1345
2014–15	Strasbourg	Limited	28–30 November 2014	(Hungary) Támas Nagy	1984
2014–15	San Antonio	Standard	28–30 November 2014	(United States) Ryan Scullin	1182
2014–15	Baltimore	Limited	13–14 December 2014	(United States) Gerard Fabiano	1235
2014–15	Milan	Modern	13–14 December 2014	(Sweden) Magnus Lantto	1760
2014–15	Denver	Standard	3–4 January 2015	(United States) Andrew Brown	1497
2014–15	Manila	Standard	3–4 January 2015	(Australia) Joseph Sclauzero	1401
2014–15	Omaha	Modern	10–11 January 2015	(United States) Erik Peters	1168
2014–15	Shizuoka	Limited	10–11 January 2015	(Japan) Akito Shinoda	2205
2014–15	San Jose	Team Limited	31 January – 1 February 2015	(United States) Paul Cheon (United States) Eric Froehlich (United States) Luis Scott-Vargas	1965 (665 teams)
2014–15	Mexico City	Limited	31 January – 1 February 2015	(Canada) Pascal Maynard	626
2014–15	Seville	Standard	14–15 February 2015	(Austria) Immanuel Gerschenson	799
2014–15	Vancouver	Modern	21–22 February 2015	(Canada) Dan Lanthier	1098
2014–15	Memphis	Standard	21–22 February 2015	(United States) Jack Fogle	1076
2014–15	Miami	Standard	7–8 March 2015	(United States) Daniel Cecchetti	1387
2014–15	Liverpool	Limited	7–8 March 2015	(Denmark) Martin Dang	1772
2014–15	Cleveland	Limited	14–15 March 2015	(Canada) Bill Tsang	1844
2014–15	Auckland	Limited	14–15 March 2015	(Japan) Teruya Kakumae	383
2014–15	Kraków	Standard	18–19 April 2015	(Canada) Alexander Hayne	1138
2014–15	Kyoto	Legacy	18–19 April 2015	(Japan) Yuuta Takahashi	1943
2014–15	São Paulo	Standard	2–3 May 2015	(Brazil) Paulo Vitor Damo da Rosa	1297
2014–15	Toronto	Standard	2–3 May 2015	(Canada) Lucas Siow	1613
2014–15	Atlantic City	Limited	9–10 May 2015	(United States) Christian Calcano	1615
2014–15	Paris	Standard	9–10 May 2015	(Belgium) Amand Dosimont	1426
2014–15	Florence	Team Limited	16–17 May 2015	(Germany) Rosario Maij (Germany) Adrian Rosada (Germany) Frank Schäfer	1296 (432 teams)
2014–15	Shanghai	Standard	16–17 May 2015	(Japan) Yuuki Ichikawa	900
2014–15	Las Vegas	Limited	30–31 May 2015	(United States) Aaron Lewis (United States) Scott Markeson	7551
2014–15	Chiba	Limited	30–31 May 2015	(Japan) Yuki Matsumoto	3551
2014–15	Utrecht	Limited	30–31 May 2015	(Italy) Davide Vergoni	3613
2014–15	Charlotte	Modern	13–14 June 2015	(United States) Michael Malone	2870
2014–15	Providence	Standard	20–21 June 2015	(United States) Sky Mason	1053
2014–15	Copenhagen	Modern	20–21 June 2015	(Poland) Przemek Knociński	1345
2014–15	Singapore	Modern	27–28 June 2015	(Japan) Hitomi Masaaki	1108
2014–15	Buenos Aires	Standard	27–28 June 2015	(Canada) Pascal Maynard	705
2014–15	Montreal	Limited	4–5 July 2015	(United States) Mike Sigrist	1220
2014–15	Lille	Legacy	4–5 July 2015	(Italy) Claudio Bonanni	1548
2014–15	Dallas	Limited	25–26 July 2015	(Japan) Shuhei Nakamura	1677
2015–16	San Diego	Standard	8–9 August 2015	(United States) Michael Majors	1493
2015–16	Hong Kong	Limited	8–9 August 2015	(Malaysia) Chye Yian Hsiang	851
2015–16	Detroit	Team Limited	15–16 August 2015	(United States) Matthew Nass (United States) Sam Pardee (United States) Jacob Wilson	2040 (680 teams)
2015–16	London	Standard	15–16 August 2015	(Venezuela) Fabrizio Anteri	2152
2015–16	Prague	Standard	29–30 August 2015	(France) Eliott Boussaud	1464
2015–16	Santiago	Limited	29–30 August 2015	(Chile) Rodrigo López Cáceres	799
2015–16	Oklahoma City	Modern	12–13 September 2015	(United States) Zac Elsik	1470
2015–16	Madrid	Limited	12–13 September 2015	(Serbia) Aleksa Telarov	1420
2015–16	Madison	Limited	10–11 October 2015	(France) Raphaël Lévy	1820
2015–16	Sydney	Limited	10–11 October 2015	(New Zealand) John Seaton	996
2015–16	Quebec City	Standard	24–25 October 2015	(Canada) Dan Lanthier	804
2015–16	Beijing	Team Limited	24–25 October 2015	(United States) Craig Wescoe (Canada) Richard Hoaen (United States) Michael Hron	813 (271 teams)
2015–16	Lyon	Limited	31 October – 1 November 2015	(France) Damien Bouillot	1952
2015–16	Porto Alegre	Modern	31 October – 1 November 2015	(Brazil) Marcos Paulo De Jesus Freitas	789
2015–16	Indianapolis	Standard	31 October – 1 November 2015	(United States) Brent Clawson	1104
2015–16	Seattle	Legacy	7–8 November 2015	(United States) Jarvis Yu	2014
2015–16	Atlanta	Limited	14–15 November 2015	(United States) Tom Martell	2085
2015–16	Brussels	Standard	14–15 November 2015	(Czech Republic) Lukáš Blohon	1938
2015–16	Pittsburgh	Modern	21–22 November 2015	(United States) Alex Bianchi	2679
2015–16	Kobe	Standard	21–22 November 2015	(Japan) Takuma Morofuji	2572
2015–16	Oakland	Standard	9–10 January 2016	(United States) Reid Duke	1929
2015–16	Vancouver	Limited	30–31 January 2016	(United States) Adam Jansen	1929
2015–16	Nagoya	Limited	30–31 January 2016	(Japan) Tomonori Hirami	2656
2015–16	Mexico City	Limited	30–31 January 2016	(Venezuela) Fabrizio Anteri	787
2015–16	Houston	Standard	27–28 February 2016	(United States) Owen Turtenwald	1851
2015–16	Detroit	Modern	5–6 March 2016	(United States) Ralph Betesh	2553
2015–16	Bologna	Modern	5–6 March 2016	(United Kingdom) Kayure Patel	2181
2015–16	Melbourne	Modern	5–6 March 2016	(Australia) David Mines	1105
2015–16	Washington, D.C.	Team Limited	12–13 March 2016	(United States) Matt Severa (United States) Justin Cohen (United States) Michael Hron	3366 (1122 teams)
2015–16	Paris	Standard	19–20 March 2016	(Czech Republic) Petr Sochůrek	1510
2015–16	Beijing	Limited	16–17 April 2016	(Japan) Hironobu Sugaya	1056
2015–16	Albuquerque	Limited	16–17 April 2016	(United States) Allen Wu	1266
2015–16	Barcelona	Limited	16–17 April 2016	(Venezuela) Fabrizio Anteri	2084
2015–16	Toronto	Standard	30 April – 1 May 2016	(Canada) Robert Lombardi	1727
2015–16	New York City	Standard	7–8 May 2016	(United States) Seth Manfield	2007
2015–16	Tokyo	Standard	7–8 May 2016	(Japan) Riku Kumagai	3335
2015–16	Los Angeles	Modern	21–22 May 2016	(United States) Simon Slutsky	2239
2015–16	Charlotte	Modern	21–22 May 2016	(Switzerland) Andreas Ganz	2399
2015–16	Minneapolis	Standard	28–29 May 2016	(United States) Alexander Johnson	1530
2015–16	Manchester	Standard	28–29 May 2016	(France) Raphaël Lévy	1697
2015–16	San José	Standard	4–5 June 2016	(United States) Seth Manfield	498
2015–16	Columbus	Legacy	11–12 June 2016	(United States) Clay Spicklemire	1824
2015–16	Prague	Legacy	11–12 June 2016	(Spain) Rodrigo Togores	1480
2015–16	Taipei	Standard	25–26 June 2016	(Japan) Yuuki Ichikawa	793
2015–16	Pittsburgh	Standard	25–26 June 2016	(United States) Evan Petre	1379
2015–16	São Paulo	Team Limited	2–3 July 2016	(Brazil) Francisco Barciella (Brazil) Carlos Romão (Brazil) Eloi Pattaro	1095 (365 teams)
2015–16	Sydney	Limited	30–31 July 2016	(United States) Scott Lipp	1077
2015–16	Montreal	Limited	30–31 July 2016	(United States) Hunter Cochran	1349
2015–16	Stockholm	Limited	30–31 July 2016	(Netherlands) Elmer van Eeghen	1244
2016–17	Portland	Standard	13–14 August 2016	(United States) Robert Santana	1715
2016–17	Rimini	Standard	13–14 August 2016	(Germany) Arne Huschenbeth	889
2016–17	Guangzhou	Modern	27–28 August 2016	(Singapore) Albertus Hui Chin Law	945
2016–17	Indianapolis	Modern	27–28 August 2016	(United States) Brandon Burton	1983
2016–17	Lille	Modern	27–28 August 2016	(Poland) Maciek Berger	1818
2016–17	Louisville	Team Limited	10–11 September 2016	(United States) Justin Cohen (United States) Matt Severa (United States) Sam Black	1383 (461 teams)
2016–17	Kyoto	Team Limited	10–11 September 2016	(Japan) Yuki Matsumoto (Japan) Yuuki Ichikawa (Japan) Kazuyuki Takimura	2337 (779 teams)
2016–17	Atlanta	Limited	8–9 October 2016	(Brazil) Carlos Romão	1665
2016–17	London	Limited	8–9 October 2016	(Portugal) Márcio Carvalho	2566
2016–17	Providence	Standard	22–23 October 2016	(China) Yichen Wang	1185
2016–17	Kuala Lumpur	Standard	22–23 October 2016	(Japan) Fumiya Matsumoto	769
2016–17	Warsaw	Standard	29–30 October 2016	(Lithuania) Gabrielius Kaklauskas	1113
2016–17	Santiago	Standard	29–30 October 2016	(Chile) John Chavarría	759
2016–17	Dallas	Modern	5–6 November 2016	(United States) Kevin Mackie	2019
2016–17	Rotterdam	Team Limited	12–13 November 2016	(Portugal) Márcio Carvalho (Spain) Javier Dominguez (Argentina) Luis Salvatto	2109 (703 teams)
2016–17	Chiba	Legacy	26–27 November 2016	(Japan) Kentaro Yamamoto	2503
2016–17	Denver	Standard	3–4 December 2016	(United States) Matt Severa	1568
2016–17	Madrid	Standard	3–4 December 2016	(Italy) Carmine D'Aniello	1456
2016–17	Milwaukee	Limited	10–11 December 2016	(United States) Steve Carter	1326
2016–17	Louisville	Legacy	6–8 January 2017	(United States) Reid Duke	1607
2016–17	San Jose	Limited	27–29 January 2017	(United States) John Asbach	1908
2016–17	Prague	Limited	27–29 January 2017	(Turkey) Yusuf Kemal Vefa	2003
2016–17	Pittsburgh	Standard	10–12 February 2017	(United States) Ryan Hare	1333
2016–17	Vancouver	Modern	17–19 February 2017	(United States) Josh Utter-Leyton	1548
2016–17	Brisbane	Modern	17–19 February 2017	(Australia) Oliver Oks	981
2016–17	Utrecht	Standard	24–26 February 2017	(France) Samuel Vuillot	1230
2016–17	New Jersey	Standard	10–12 March 2017	(United States) Corey Baumeister	1622
2016–17	Barcelona	Standard	10–12 March 2017	(Czech Republic) Petr Sochůrek	1262
2016–17	Shizuoka	Standard	17–19 March 2017	(Japan) Ryohei Kirino	2716
2016–17	Porto Alegre	Standard	17–19 March 2017	(Brazil) Victor Fernando Silva	575
2016–17	Orlando	Limited	24–26 March 2017	(Sweden) Joel Larsson	1284
2016–17	San Antonio	Team Modern	31 March – 2 April 2017	(United States) Andrejs Prost (United States) Adam Jansen (United States) Greg Orange	1668 (556 teams)
2016–17	Mexico City	Team Limited	7–9 April 2017	(United States) Andrew Cuneo (United States) Ben Stark (United States) Eric Froehlich	444 (148 teams)
2016–17	Richmond	Limited	5–7 May 2017	(United States) Michael Baraniecki	1593
2016–17	Bologna	Limited	5–7 May 2017	(Italy) Corrado De Sio	1667
2016–17	Beijing	Limited	5–7 May 2017	(Singapore) Kelvin Chew	1022
2016–17	Montreal	Standard	19–21 May 2017	(United States) Kevin Jones	848
2016–17	Santiago	Standard	19–21 May 2017	(Argentina) Mauro Sasso	748
2016–17	Copenhagen	Modern	26–28 May 2017	(Italy) Mattia Rizzi	1836
2016–17	Kobe	Modern	26–28 May 2017	(Malaysia) Joe Soh	2798
2016–17	Omaha	Standard	2–4 June 2017	(United States) Brad Nelson	831
2016–17	Amsterdam	Standard	2–4 June 2017	(Czech Republic) Lukáš Blohon	1168
2016–17	Manila	Standard	2–4 June 2017	(Japan) Ryoichi Tamada	756
2016–17	Las Vegas	Legacy	15–16 June 2017	(United States) Andrew Calderon	2644
2016–17	Las Vegas	Limited	16–17 June 2017	(Brazil) Thiago Saporito	2693
2016–17	Las Vegas	Modern	17–18 June 2017	(Canada) Mani Davoudi	3410
2016–17	Cleveland	Team Limited	23–25 June 2017	(United States) Owen Turtenwald (United States) William Jensen (United States) Reid Duke	1611 (537 teams)
2016–17	Sydney	Team Limited	23–25 June 2017	(Australia) James Wilks (Australia) Simon Linabury (Australia) Ivan Schroder	852 (284 teams)
2016–17	Toronto	Limited	21–23 July 2017	(Canada) Robert Anderson	1396
2016–17	Kyoto	Limited	21–23 July 2017	(United States) William Jensen	2398
2017–18	Minneapolis	Standard	4–6 August 2017	(United States) Steve Locke	1150
2017–18	Birmingham	Modern	11–13 August 2017	(France) Loïc Le Briand	1739
2017–18	São Paulo	Modern	11–13 August 2017	(Brazil) João Lelis	1237
2017–18	Denver	Standard	18–20 August 2017	(United States) Brad Nelson	1188
2017–18	Indianapolis	Limited	25–27 August 2017	(United States) Andrew Cuneo	1186
2017–18	Metz	Limited	25–27 August 2017	(Italy) Francesco Fritto Hugony	1483
2017–18	Washington, D.C.	Standard	1–3 September 2017	(United States) Matt Severa	1568
2017–18	Turin	Standard	1–3 September 2017	(Slovenia) Robin Dolar	924
2017–18	Providence	Team Limited	29 September – 1 October 2017	(Czech Republic) Martin Jůza (United States) Andrew Baeckstrom (United States) Corey Burkhart	1689 (563 teams)
2017–18	Shizuoka	Team Limited	29 September – 1 October 2017	(Japan) Michio Abe (Japan) Syo Hayakawa (Japan) Kentaro Tachibana	1674 (558 teams)
2017–18	Phoenix	Limited	27–29 October 2017	(United States) Sean Miller	1076
2017–18	Liverpool	Limited	27–29 October 2017	(United Kingdom) Marc Purvis	1209
2017–18	Hong Kong	Limited	27–29 October 2017	(Japan) Rei Sato	731
2017–18	Atlanta	Standard	10–12 November 2017	(United States) Alex Lloyd	1397
2017–18	Warsaw	Standard	10–12 November 2017	(France) Jean-Emmanuel Depraz	1246
2017–18	Shanghai	Standard	10–12 November 2017	(China) Huachao Song	713
2017–18	Portland	Standard	17–19 November 2017	(United States) (Israel) Shahar Shenhar	1688
2017–18	Lyon	Team Limited	24–26 November 2017	(Denmark) Thomas Enevoldsen (Denmark) Christoffer Larsen (Denmark) Michael Bonde	1893 (631 teams)
2017–18	Oklahoma City	Modern	8–10 December 2017	(United States) Larry Li	1419
2017–18	Madrid	Team Modern	8–10 December 2017	(Spain) Rodrigo Togores (Spain) Cristian Ortiz Ros (Spain) Adrian Ramiro Cano	1863 (621 teams)
2017–18	New Jersey	Limited	15–17 December 2017	(Canada) Kale Thompson	1130
2017–18	Singapore	Limited	15–17 December 2017	(Singapore) Lim Zhong Yi	575
2017–18	Santa Clara	Team Trios Constructed	5–7 January 2018	(United States) William Ho (United States) John Martin (United States) Jeremy Frye	1482 (494 teams)
2017–18	Indianapolis	Team Limited	19–21 January 2018	(China) Xinyu Fei (Taiwan) Chih-Cheng Yeh (China) Zirui Zhou	1542 (514 teams)
2017–18	Houston	Limited	26–28 January 2018	(Mexico) Axel Martinez Ocampo	887
2017–18	London	Limited	26–28 January 2018	(Mexico) Marcelino Freeman	1979
2017–18	Toronto	Modern	9–11 February 2018	(United States) Daniel Ward	1679
2017–18	Lyon	Modern	16–18 February 2018	(Poland) Grzegorz Kowalski	2058
2017–18	Memphis	Standard	23–25 February 2018	(United States) Tyler Schroeder	1082
2017–18	Santiago	Team Limited	9–11 March 2018	(Argentina) Sebastian Pozzo (Argentina) Luis Salvatto (Brazil) Lucas Berthoud	786 (262 teams)
2017–18	Madrid	Team Trios Constructed	9–11 March 2018	(United Kingdom) Christoph Green (United Kingdom) Ben Jones (United Kingdom) Charles Eliatamby	1062 (354 teams)
2017–18	Phoenix	Modern	16–18 March 2018	(United States) Steve Locke	1332
2017–18	Kyoto	Team Trios Constructed	23–25 March 2018	(Japan) Ryouichi Yamamoto (Japan) Yuusuke Matsubara (Japan) Kazuki Takamura	2262 (754 teams)
2017–18	Amsterdam	Team Limited	30 March – 1 April 2018	(Netherlands) Jeroen Kreijne (Netherlands) Simon Geurts (Netherlands) Pim Heijne	1566 (522 teams)
2017–18	Seattle	Legacy	5–8 April 2018	(United States) Daniel Duterte	1664
2017–18	Seattle	Standard	5–8 April 2018	(China) Gan Yan	1509
2017–18	Hartford	Modern	13–15 April 2018	(United States) Matthew Nass	1800
2017–18	Sydney	Team Modern	13–15 April 2018	(Australia) Jessica Estephan (Australia) Ryan Lewis-Jonns (Australia) Lachlan Saunders	1050 (350 teams)
2017–18	Columbus	Team Limited	27–29 April 2018	(Canada) David Goldfarb (Canada) Edgar Magalhaes (United States) Jacob Baugh	1329 (440 teams)
2017–18	Bologna	Team Limited	27–29 April 2018	(Italy) Antonio Pinto (Italy) Davide Miani (Italy) Usama Sajjad	1440 (480 teams)
2017–18	Dallas	Limited	4–6 May 2018	(United States) Robert Brown	1043
2017–18	Beijing	Limited	4–6 May 2018	(China) Zhiyang Zhang	909
2017–18	Birmingham	Legacy	10–13 May 2018	(United Kingdom) Gary Campbell	1200
2017–18	Birmingham	Standard	10–13 May 2018	(Denmark) Simon Nielsen	1169
2017–18	Toronto	Team Trios Constructed	18–20 May 2018	(Canada) Morgan McLaughlin (Canada) Chris Harabas (Canada) Lucas Siow	1167 (389 teams)
2017–18	Washington, D.C.	Team Limited	25–27 May 2018	(United States) Andrew Tenjum (Czech Republic) Petr Sochůrek (United States) Peter Ingram	1617 (539 teams)
2017–18	Copenhagen	Standard	8–10 June 2018	(Germany) Tobias Maurer	753
2017–18	Las Vegas	Modern	14–16 June 2018	(United States) Matthew Nass	2778
2017–18	Las Vegas	Limited	15–17 June 2018	(United States) Michael Bernat	2079
2017–18	Pittsburgh	Standard	22–24 June 2018	(United States) Braham Thomas	929
2017–18	Singapore	Standard	22–24 June 2018	(Japan) Yuuki Ichikawa	682
2017–18	Barcelona	Modern	29 June – 1 July 2018	(Finland) Matti Kuisma	1547
2017–18	São Paulo	Modern	6–8 July 2018	(Chile) Jose Echeverria Paredes	1429
2017–18	Sacramento	Limited	20–22 July 2018	(United States) Richard Liu	1270
2017–18	Chiba	Limited	20–22 July 2018	(Spain) Guillem Salvador Arnal	2471
2017–18	Minneapolis	Limited	27–29 July 2018	(Sweden) Magnus Lantto	1349
2017–18	Turin	Limited	27–29 July 2018	(United Kingdom) Joao Choca	1032
2017–18	Orlando	Standard	10–12 August 2018	(United States) Gabriel Joglar	997
2017–18	Brussels	Standard	10–12 August 2018	(France) Jérémy Dezani	1109
2017–18	Providence	Standard	17–19 August 2018	(United States) Daniel Duffee	693
2017–18	Los Angeles	Standard	17–19 August 2018	(United States) Logan Nettles	1072
2017–18	Prague	Modern	24–26 August 2018	(Finland) Lauri Pispa	1999
2017–18	Richmond	Legacy	31 August – 2 September 2018	(United States) Andrew Cuneo	842
2017–18	Richmond	Standard	31 August – 2 September 2018	(United States) Alex Hon	786
2017–18	Detroit	Team Unified Modern	7–9 September 2018	(United States) William Courson (United States) Antonio Perez (United States) Andrew Koko Lopez	1596 (532 teams)
2017–18	Stockholm	Modern	14–16 September 2018	(Czech Republic) Ondřej Stráský	1322
2017–18	Hong Kong	Modern	14–16 September 2018	(China) Fei Xu	908
2018–19	Montreal	Limited	5–7 October 2018	(Canada) Christopher Huu Nguyen	1070
2018–19	Mexico City	Limited	5–7 October 2018	(United States) Mark Jacobson	416
2018–19	Denver	Team Limited	12–14 October 2018	(United States) Jack Dobbin (United States) Jacob Baugh (United States) Andrew Tenjum	1518 (506 teams)
2018–19	Nagoya	Team Limited	12–14 October 2018	(Japan) Ken Yukuhiro (Japan) Rei Sato (Japan) Kentaro Yamamoto	1992 (664 teams)
2018–19	New Jersey	Standard	26–28 October 2018	(United States) Eli Kassis	1213
2018–19	Lille	Standard	26–28 October 2018	(Switzerland) Etienne Busson	1339
2018–19	Atlanta	Modern	2–4 November 2018	(China) Peiyuan Zheng	1553
2018–19	Milwaukee	Standard	16–18 November 2018	(United States) Adrian Sullivan	1298
2018–19	Melbourne	Limited	16–18 November 2018	(Japan) Taiga Tsujikawa	846
2018–19	Warsaw	Limited	23–25 November 2018	(Canada) Eduardo Sajgalik	1836
2018–19	Shizuoka	Legacy	29 November – 2 December 2018	(Japan) Teruya Kakumae	1429
2018–19	Shizuoka	Standard	29 November – 2 December 2018	(Japan) Atsushi Nakashima	1960
2018–19	Portland	Modern	7–9 December 2018	(United States) Tyler Putnam	1812
2018–19	Liverpool	Team Unified Modern	7–9 December 2018	(Mexico) Daniel Becerra (Mexico) Marcelino Freeman (Mexico) Dagoberto Silva	1506 (502 teams)
2018–19	Vancouver	Limited	28–30 December 2018	(Canada) Jason Fleurant	923
2018–19	Oakland	Modern	4–6 January 2019	(United States) Eli Kassis	1139
2018–19	Prague	Limited	11–13 January 2019	(Belgium) Pascal Vieren	2495
2018–19	New Jersey	Limited	25–27 January 2019	(United States) Max Williams	1409
2018–19	Sydney	Limited	1–3 February 2019	(Australia) Jarron Puszet	526
2018–19	Toronto	Modern	8–10 February 2019	(United States) Michael Rapp	1317
2018–19	Memphis	Standard	15–17 February 2019	(United States) Jody Keith	988
2018–19	Strasbourg	Limited	15–17 February 2019	(Switzerland) Yves Sele	1615
2018–19	Cleveland	Limited	22–24 February 2019	(United States) Allen Wu	1229
2018–19	Los Angeles	Modern	1–3 March 2019	(United States) Michael Bernat	1569
2018–19	Tampa	Modern	15–17 March 2019	(United States) Roshen Eapen	988
2018–19	Bilbao	Modern	15–17 March 2019	(France) Guillaume Matignon	1614
2018–19	Kyoto	Standard	22–24 March 2019	(South Korea) Dae-kyeung Bae	2052
2018–19	Calgary	Modern	29–31 March 2019	(Hungary) Attila Fur	956
2018–19	São Paulo	Modern	12–14 April 2019	(Brazil) Marlos Batista Ferreira	1395
2018–19	Niagara Falls	Legacy	19–21 April 2019	(Canada) Daniel Goetschel	964
2018–19	Yokohama	Modern	19–21 April 2019	(Japan) Takahito Kobayashi	2495
2018–19	London	Limited	26–28 April 2019	(France) Alexandre Habert	2612 (1526 unique players)
2018–19	Madison	Limited	10–12 May 2019	(United States) Ben Beydler	953
2018–19	Providence	Team Limited	24–26 May 2019	(United States) Vince Ferraiuolo (United States) Joel Sadowsky (United States) Andy Vorel	1080 (360 teams)
2018–19	Kansas City	Standard	31 May – 2 June 2019	(United States) Ben Friedman	856
2018–19	Taipei	Standard	7–9 June 2019	(South Korea) Seok-hyun Kim	1085
2018–19	Washington, D.C.	Limited	14–16 June 2019	(United States) Joseph Wagner	1151
2018–19	Copenhagen	Limited	14–16 June 2019	(Netherlands) Kim Homsma	1300
2018–19	Seattle	Limited	20–23 June 2019	(United States) Matt Sikkink Johnson	2190 (1596 unique players)
2018–19	Dallas	Modern	28–30 June 2019	(United States) Austin Bursavich	1256
2018–19	Detroit	Limited	12–14 July 2019	(United States) Ben Bellis	706
2018–19	Kraków	Limited	12–14 July 2019	(Norway) Sveinung Bjørnerud	915
2018–19	Denver	Standard	19–21 July 2019	(United States) Luis Scott-Vargas	615
2018–19	Barcelona	Modern	26–28 July 2019	(Denmark) Troels Munk	1512
2018–19	Chiba	Limited	2–4 August 2019	(Japan) Daisuke Nakamichi	2316
2018–19	Minneapolis	Modern	9–11 August 2019	(United States) Justin Plocher	980
2018–19	Birmingham	Modern	16–18 August 2019	(United Kingdom) Rory Kear-Smith	912
2018–19	Las Vegas	Modern	22–24 August 2019	(Denmark) Simon Nielsen	1851
2018–19	Las Vegas	Limited	23–25 August 2019	(United States) Allen Wu	1420
2018–19	Indianapolis	Team Modern	6–8 September 2019	(Canada) Mohamad Qadi (Canada) Joseph Karani (Canada) Kevin Brown	990 (330 teams)
2018–19	Ghent	Team Modern	13–15 September 2019	(Spain) Ruben Pérez (Spain) Joel Calafell (Spain) Esther Trujillo	1434 (478 teams)
2018–19	Atlanta	Legacy	20–22 September 2019	(United States) Cyrus Corman-Gill	1022
2018–19	Montreal	Limited	4–6 October 2019	(Canada) Alexander Hayne	825
2018–19	Utrecht	Limited	11–13 October 2019	(Sweden) Johannes Alberyd	1469
2018–19	Bangkok	Limited	11–13 October 2019	(Czech Republic) Petr Sochůrek	813
2018–19	Phoenix	Limited	24–26 October 2019	(United States) Max Mick	556
2018–19	Lyon	Standard	1–3 November 2019	(France) Antoine Lagarde	941
2018–19	Nagoya	Standard	1–3 November 2019	(Japan) Riku Kumagai	1754
2018–19	Richmond	Standard	8–10 November 2019	(United States) Abe Corrigan	568
2018–19	São Paulo	Standard	15–17 November 2019	(Brazil) Thiago Rosenmann	655 (468 unique players)
2018–19	Columbus	Modern	22–24 November 2019	(United States) Brian Coval	657
2018–19	Bologna	Legacy	29–31 November 2019	(Germany) Marc Vogt	1596
2018–19	Brisbane	Standard	6–8 December 2019	(Australia) Kyle Gibson	455
2018–19	Oklahoma City	Standard	13–15 December 2019	(United States) Matt Carlson	348
2018–19	Portland	Standard	20–22 December 2019	(United States) Dylan Nollen	511
2020	Austin	Modern	10–12 January 2020	(United States) Christopher Candreva	801
2020	New Jersey	Limited	24–26 January 2020	(Canada) Isaak Krut	1434
2020	Brussels	Pioneer	30 January – 2 February 2020	(Spain) Carlos Moral	1663
2020	Nagoya	Pioneer	31 January – 2 February 2020	(Japan) Takuya Ishizuki	1672
2020	Phoenix	Pioneer	6–9 February 2020	(United States) Ben Weitz	941
2020	Reno	Limited	28 February – 1 March 2020	(Canada) Nathaniel Knox	678
2020	Lyon	Standard	6–8 March 2020	(Italy) Biagio Ruocco	583
2020	Online Season 1 Final	Standard	11–12 April 2020	(Venezuela) Fabrizio Anteri	121
2020	Online Season 2 Final	Standard	9–10 May 2020	(Canada) Jason Fleurant	128

== List of Magic Spotlight Series ==
Season	Location	Format	Date	Winner	Players
2025	Atlanta	Standard	3–5 January 2025	(United States) Nicholas Odenheimer	1453
2025	Utrecht	Modern	15–16 March 2025	(Germany) Raul Porojan	1590
2025	Denver	Limited	11–13 April 2025	(United States) Andrew Baeckstrom	1219
2025	Indianapolis	Modern	30 May – 1 June 2025	(United States) Hunter Ovington	682
2025	Chiba	Standard	27–29 June 2025	(Japan) Kazuya Hirabayashi	2265
2025	Orlando	Standard	29–31 August 2025	(United States) Brennan Roy	674
2025	Baltimore	Standard	24–26 October 2025	(Canada) Alexandre MacIsaac	548
2025	Liverpool	Standard	31 October – 2 November 2025	(France) Alexey Paulot	584
2026	Atlanta	Standard	9–11 January 2026	(United States) Kye Nelson	792
2026	Lyon	Standard	9–11 January 2026	(Denmark) Simon Nielsen	753
2026	Toronto	Limited	6–8 February 2026	(United States) Valerie Jade	1762
2026	Richmond	Standard	6–8 March 2026	(United States) John Puglisi Clark	675
2026	London	Standard	8–10 May 2026	(Netherlands) Koen de Vos	605
2026	Chiba	Standard	29–31 May 2026	(Japan) Masataka Hori	893
2026	Las Vegas	Team Limited	26–28 June 2026	(United States) Tom Martell (United States) Sam Black (United States) Greg Dyer	897 (299 teams)
2026	Brussels	Team Limited	24–27 July 2026	(Germany) Thoralf Severin (Germany) Oliver Rausch (Germany) Jasper Grimmer	1650 (550 teams)
2026	Brisbane	Modern	28–30 August 2026	(Australia) Jefferson Lee	574
2026	Dallas	Modern	4–6 September 2026	(United States) Roy Varney	932
2026	Hartford	Standard	23–25 October 2026	(United States) Alexander von Stange	781
2026	Beijing	Standard	31 October – 1 November 2026	(China) Que Mo	869
2027	Lille	Limited	9–10 January 2027	TBD	TBA
2027	Minneapolis	Limited	9–10 January 2027	TBD	TBA
2027	Zagreb	Limited	13–14 March 2027	TBD	TBA
2027	Toronto	Limited	13–14 March 2027	TBD	TBA
2027	Seattle	Modern	24–25 April 2027	TBD	TBA
2027	Beijing	Modern	24–25 April 2027	TBD	TBA
2027	Hartford	Limited	12–13 June 2027	TBD	TBA
2027	Shizuoka	Limited	24–25 July 2027	TBD	TBA
2027	Montreal	Limited	24–25 July 2027	TBD	TBA
2027	Washington, D.C.	Team Limited	14–15 August 2027	TBD	TBA
2027	Utrecht	Team Limited	4–5 September 2027	TBD	TBA
2027	Sydney	Team Limited	4–5 September 2027	TBD	TBA
2027	Valencia	Pioneer	16–17 October 2027	TBD	TBA
2027	Dallas	Pioneer	23–24 October 2027	TBD	TBA

== Grand Prix and Spotlight Series by country ==
The totals for each of the three columns will be different from each other, for several reasons:

- Team Grand Prix have multiple winners, possibly from different countries.
- The same individual may win multiple Grand Prix.
- Future Grand Prix and Spotlight Series will already have been scheduled at a host city but not yet have a winner.

Country	Number of GPs and Spotlight Series won	GPs and Spotlight Series Won, in chronological order	Number of winning players	Winning players, in chronological order (multiple wins in parentheses)	Number of GPs and Spotlight Series hosted	GPs and Spotlight Series hosted, in chronological order
United States	258	Washington, D.C. 1997, Toronto 1997, San Francisco 1997, Madrid 1998, Rio de Janeiro 1998, Atlanta 1998, Zürich 1998, Indianapolis 1998, Boston 1998, San Francisco 1999, Kansas City 1999, Washington, D.C. 1999, Memphis 1999, San Diego 1999, Tours 1999, Seattle 2000, Nagoya 2000, St. Louis 2000, Pittsburgh 2000, Manchester 2000, Phoenix 2000, New Orleans 2001, Amsterdam 2001, Boston 2001, Yokohama 2001, Turin 2001, Taipei 2001, Columbus 2001, Denver 2001, Minneapolis 2001, Montreal 2001, Atlanta 2001, Las Vegas 2001, Houston 2002, Fukuoka 2002, Tampa 2002, Milwaukee 2002, New Jersey 2002, Cleveland 2002, Copenhagen 2002, Los Angeles 2002, New Orleans 2003, Boston 2003, Pittsburgh 2003, Detroit 2003, Kansas City 2003, Anaheim 2003, Oakland 2004, Columbus 2004, Washington, D.C. 2004, Orlando 2004, New Jersey 2004, Austin 2004, Chicago 2004, Seattle 2005, Detroit 2005, Minneapolis 2005, Salt Lake City 2005, Philadelphia 2005, Charlotte 2005, Madison 2006, Toronto 2006, Massachusetts 2007, Columbus 2007, San Francisco 2007, Kraków 2007, Daytona Beach 2007, Vancouver 2008, Philadelphia 2008, Denver 2008, Kansas City 2008, Atlanta 2008, Los Angeles 2009, Boston 2009, Tampa 2009, Minneapolis 2009, Oakland 2010, Houston 2010, Washington, D.C. 2010, Sendai 2010, Nashville 2010, Atlanta 2011, Paris 2011, Denver 2011, Dallas 2011, Providence 2011, Kansas City 2011, San Diego 2011, Orlando 2012, Lincoln 2012, Baltimore 2012, Indianapolis 2012, Nashville 2012, Mexico City 2012, Salt Lake City 2012, Turin 2012, Minneapolis 2012, Anaheim 2012, Vancouver 2012, Atlanta 2012, Columbus 2012, Boston 2012, San Jose 2012, Chicago 2012, Charleston 2012, San Antonio 2012, Indianapolis 2012, Quebec City 2013, Charlotte 2013, San Diego 2013, Pittsburgh 2013, Portland 2013, Providence 2013, Houston 2013, Las Vegas 2013, Miami 2013, Kansas City 2013, Oakland 2013, Oklahoma City 2013, Washington, D.C. 2013, Albuquerque 2013, Kyoto 2013, Toronto 2013, Sacramento 2014, Mexico City 2014, Montreal 2014, Cincinnati 2014, Phoenix 2014, Philadelphia 2014, Washington, D.C. 2014, Portland 2014, Salt Lake City 2014, Orlando 2014, Los Angeles 2014, Nashville 2014, New Jersey 2014, Ottawa 2014, San Antonio 2014, Baltimore 2014, Denver 2015, Omaha 2015, San Jose 2015, Memphis 2015, Miami 2015, Atlantic City 2015, Las Vegas 2015, Charlotte 2015, Providence 2015, Montreal 2015, San Diego 2015, Detroit 2015, Oklahoma City 2015, Beijing 2015, Indianapolis 2015, Seattle 2015, Atlanta 2015, Pittsburgh 2015, Oakland 2016, Vancouver 2016, Houston 2016, Detroit 2016, Washington, D.C. 2016, Albuquerque 2016, New York City 2016, Los Angeles 2016, Minneapolis 2016, San José 2016, Columbus 2016, Pittsburgh 2016, Sydney 2016, Montreal 2016, Portland 2016, Indianapolis 2016, Louisville 2016, Dallas 2016, Denver 2016, Milwaukee 2016, Louisville 2017, San Jose 2017, Pittsburgh 2017, Vancouver 2017, New Jersey 2017, San Antonio 2017, Mexico City 2017, Richmond 2017, Montreal 2017, Omaha 2017, Las Vegas 2017 (Legacy), Cleveland 2017, Kyoto 2017, Minneapolis 2017, Denver 2017, Indianapolis 2017, Washington D.C. 2017, Providence 2017, Phoenix 2017, Atlanta 2017, Portland 2017, Oklahoma City 2017, Santa Clara 2018, Toronto 2018, Memphis 2018, Phoenix 2018, Seattle 2018 (Legacy), Hartford 2018, Columbus 2018, Dallas 2018, Washington D.C. 2018, Las Vegas 2018 (Modern), Las Vegas 2018 (Limited), Pittsburgh 2018, Sacramento 2018, Orlando 2018, Providence 2018, Los Angeles 2018, Richmond 2018 (Legacy), Richmond 2018 (Standard), Detroit 2018, Mexico City 2018, Denver 2018, New Jersey 2018, Milwaukee 2018, Portland 2018, Oakland 2019, New Jersey 2019, Toronto 2019, Memphis 2019, Cleveland 2019, Los Angeles 2019, Tampa 2019, Madison 2019, Providence 2019, Kansas City 2019, Washington, D.C. 2019, Seattle 2019, Dallas 2019, Detroit 2019, Denver 2019, Minneapolis 2019, Las Vegas 2019 (Limited), Atlanta 2019, Phoenix 2019, Richmond 2019, Columbus 2019, Oklahoma City 2019, Portland 2019, Austin 2020, Phoenix 2020, Atlanta 2025, Denver 2025, Indianapolis 2025, Orlando 2025, Atlanta 2026, Toronto 2026, Richmond 2026, Las Vegas 2026, Dallas 2026, Hartford 2026	217	Mike Long, Brian Kibler (3), Robert Swarowski, Steven O'Mahoney-Schwartz (4), Jon Finkel (3), Randy Buehler, Eric Jordan, Richard Van Cleave, Mark Gordon, Ben Farkas, Michael Pustilnik (2), William Jensen (7), Alex Shvartsman (4), Bob Maher (3), Trevor Blackwell, Daniel O'Mahoney-Schwartz, Ben Rubin (2), Casey McCarrel, Darwin Kastle (2), Sean Fitzgerald, Bill Stead (2), Chris Benafel (3), Tom Swan, David Williams (3), Peter Szigeti, Brock Parker (2), Daniel Clegg (2), Dave Humpherys (2), Rob Dougherty, Brett Shears, Mike Turian (2), Eugene Harvey, Joshua Smith, Sol Malka, Eric Taylor, Eric James, Kyle Rose, Norman Woods, Valentin Moskovich, Philip Freneau, Zvi Mowshowitz (2), Justin Gary, Antonino De Rosa (4), Ken Ho, Chris Fennel, Charles Gindy, Osyp Lebedowicz, Jeff Garza, Jonathan Sonne (2), Timothy Aten, Gadiel Szleifer, John Pelcack, Ernie Marchesano, Jordan Berkowitz, Alex Lieberman, Michael Krumb, Brian Ziegler, Tim Bulgery, Matt Wang, Steven Sadin, Luis Scott-Vargas (6), Paul Cheon (3), Seth Manfield (5), Gerard Fabiano (3), Gerry Thompson (2), Tim Landale, Marlon Egolf, Gaudenis Vidugiris (3), Zohar Baghat, Matthew Nass (5), Adam Yurchick, Brad Nelson (3), Jason Ford, David Sharfman, David Shiels, James Rynkiewicz, Shahar Shenhar (4), Conley Woods, Bronson Magnan, Matthew Costa, Tom Martell (4), Reid Duke (6), Paul Rietzl (2), Christian Calcano (2), Marc Lalague (2), David Stroud, Jacob Maynard, Brian Demars, Matt Sperling, Jacob Wilson (3), Jon Bolding, Tyler Lytle, Ben Stark (2), Nico Christiansen, Frank Skarren (2), Nathan Holiday, Sam Pardee (2), Andrew Longo, Eric Philipps, Eric Berger, Neal Oliver, Pierre-Christophe Mondon, Brian Braun-Duin (2), Owen Turtenwald (5), Michael Hron (3), Ari Lax, Kyle Boggemes, Robert Berni, Mike Sigrist (2), Brandon Nelson, Eugene Hwang, Daniel Scheid, Jesse Hampton, Ryan Scullin, Andrew Brown, Erik Peters, Eric Froehlich (2), Jack Fogle, Daniel Cecchetti, Aaron Lewis, Scott Markeson, Michael Malone, Sky Mason, Michael Majors, Zac Elsik, Craig Wescoe, Brian Clawson, Jarvis Yu, Alex Bianchi, Adam Jansen (2), Ralph Betesh, Matt Severa (4), Justin Cohen (2), Allen Wu (3), Simon Slutsky, Alexander Johnson, Clay Spicklemire, Evan Petre, Scott Lipp, Hunter Cochran, Robert Santana, Brandon Burton, Sam Black (2), Kevin Mackie, Steve Carter, John Asbach, Ryan Hare, Josh Utter-Leyton, Corey Baumeister, Greg Orange, Andrejs Prost, Andrew Cuneo (3), Michael Baraniecki, Kevin Jones, Andrew Calderon, Steve Locke (2), Andrew Baeckstrom (2), Corey Burkhart, Sean Miller, Alex Lloyd, Larry Li, William Ho, John Martin, Jeremy Frye, Daniel Ward, Tyler Schroeder, Daniel Duterte, Jacob Baugh (2), Robert Brown, Andrew Tenjum (2), Peter Ingram, Michael Bernat (2), Braham Thomas, Richard Liu, Gabriel Joglar, Daniel Duffee, Logan Nettles, Alex Hon, William Courson, Antonio Perez, Andrew Koko Lopez, Mark Jacobson, Jack Dobbin, Eli Kassis (2), Adrian Sullivan, Tyler Putnam, Max Williams, Michael Rapp, Jody Keith, Roshen Eapen, Ben Beydler, Vince Ferraiuolo, Joel Sadowsky, Andy Vorel, Ben Friedman, Joseph Wagner, Matt Sikkink Johnson, Austin Bursavich, Ben Bellis, Justin Plocher, Cyrus Corman-Gill, Max Mick, Abe Corrigan, Brian Coval, Matt Carlson, Dylan Nollen, Christopher Candreva, Ben Weitz, Nicholas Odenheimer, Hunter Ovington, Brennan Roy, Kye Nelson, Valerie Jade, John Puglisi Clark, Greg Dyer, Roy Varney, Alexander von Stange	268	Washington, D.C. 1997, San Francisco 1997, Atlanta 1998, Indianapolis 1998, Boston 1998, Austin 1998, San Francisco 1999, Kansas City 1999, Washington, D.C. 1999, Memphis 1999, San Diego 1999, Seattle 2000, Philadelphia 2000, St. Louis 2000, Pittsburgh 2000, Dallas 2000, Phoenix 2000, New Orleans 2001, Boston 2001, Detroit 2001, Columbus 2001, Denver 2001, Minneapolis 2001, Atlanta 2001, Las Vegas 2001, Houston 2002, Tampa 2002, Milwaukee 2002, New Jersey 2002, Cleveland 2002, Philadelphia 2002, Los Angeles 2002, New Orleans 2003, Boston 2003, Pittsburgh 2003, Detroit 2003, Atlanta 2003, Kansas City 2003, Anaheim 2003, Oakland 2004, Columbus 2004, Washington, D.C. 2004, Orlando 2004, New Jersey 2004, Austin 2004, Chicago 2004, Boston 2005, Seattle 2005, Detroit 2005, Minneapolis 2005, Salt Lake City 2005, Philadelphia 2005, Charlotte 2005, Richmond 2006, Madison 2006, St. Louis 2006, Phoenix 2006, New Jersey 2006, Dallas 2007, Massachusetts 2007, Columbus 2007, San Francisco 2007, Daytona Beach 2007, Philadelphia 2008, Indianapolis 2008, Denver 2008, Kansas City 2008, Atlanta 2008, Los Angeles 2009, Chicago 2009, Seattle 2009, Boston 2009, Tampa 2009, Minneapolis 2009, Oakland 2010, Houston 2010, Washington, D.C. 2010, Columbus 2010, Portland 2010, Nashville 2010, Atlanta 2011, Denver 2011, Dallas 2011, Providence 2011, Kansas City 2011, Pittsburgh 2011, San Diego 2011, Austin 2012, Orlando 2012, Lincoln 2012, Baltimore 2012, Seattle 2012, Indianapolis 2012, Nashville 2012, Salt Lake City 2012, Minneapolis 2012, Anaheim 2012, Atlanta 2012, Columbus 2012, Boston 2012, San Jose 2012, Philadelphia 2012, Chicago 2012, Charleston 2012, San Antonio 2012, Indianapolis 2012 (2nd), Denver 2013, Atlantic City 2013, Charlotte 2013, San Diego 2013, Pittsburgh 2013, Portland 2013, Providence 2013, Houston 2013, Las Vegas 2013, Miami 2013, Kansas City 2013, Oakland 2013, Louisville 2013, Dallas 2013, Sacramento 2014, Richmond 2014, Cincinnati 2014, Phoenix 2014, Philadelphia 2014, Minneapolis 2014, Atlanta 2014, Chicago 2014, Washington D.C. 2014, Boston 2014, Portland 2014, Salt Lake City 2014, Orlando 2014, Los Angeles 2014, Nashville 2014, New Jersey 2014, San Antonio 2014, Baltimore 2014, Denver 2015, Omaha 2015, San Jose 2015, Memphis 2015, Miami 2015, Cleveland 2015, Atlantic City 2015, Indianapolis 2015, Las Vegas 2015, Charlotte 2015, Providence 2015, San Diego 2015, Detroit 2015, Oklahoma City 2015, Madison 2015, Seattle 2015, Atlanta 2015, Pittsburgh 2015, Oakland 2016, Houston 2016, Detroit 2016, Washington D.C. 2016, Albuquerque 2016, Los Angeles 2016, Charlotte 2016, Minneapolis 2016, Columbus 2016, Pittsburgh 2016, Portland 2016, New York City 2016, Indianapolis 2016, Louisville 2016, Atlanta 2016, Providence 2016, Dallas 2016, Denver 2016, Milwaukee 2016, Louisville 2017, San Jose 2017, Pittsburgh 2017, New Jersey 2017, Orlando 2017, San Antonio 2017, Richmond 2017, Omaha 2017, Las Vegas 2017 (3 separate GP's), Columbus 2017, Minneapolis 2017, Denver 2017, Indianapolis 2017, Washington D.C. 2017, Providence 2017, Phoenix 2017, Atlanta 2017, Portland 2017, Oklahoma City 2017, New Jersey 2017 (2nd), Santa Clara 2018, Indianapolis 2018, Houston 2018, Memphis 2018, Phoenix 2018, Seattle 2018 (2 separate GP's), Hartford 2018, Columbus 2018, Dallas 2018, Washington, D.C. 2018, Las Vegas 2018 (2 separate GP's), Pittsburgh 2018, Sacramento 2018, Minneapolis 2018, Orlando 2018, Providence 2018, Los Angeles 2018, Richmond 2018 (2 separate GP's), Detroit 2018, Denver 2018, New Jersey 2018, Atlanta 2018, Milwaukee 2018, Portland 2018, Oakland 2019, New Jersey 2019, Memphis 2019, Cleveland 2019, Los Angeles 2019, Tampa 2019, Niagara Falls 2019, Madison 2019, Providence 2019, Kansas City 2019, Washington, D.C. 2019, Seattle 2019, Dallas 2019, Detroit 2019, Denver 2019, Minneapolis 2019, Las Vegas 2019, Indianapolis 2019, Atlanta 2019, Phoenix 2019, Richmond 2019, Columbus 2019, Oklahoma City 2019, Portland 2019, Austin 2020, New Jersey 2020, Phoenix 2020, Reno 2020, Atlanta 2025, Denver 2025, Indianapolis 2025, Orlando 2025, Baltimore 2025, Atlanta 2026, Richmond 2026, Las Vegas 2026, Dallas 2026, Hartford 2026, Minneapolis 2027, Seattle 2027, Hartford 2027, Washington, D.C. 2027, Dallas 2027
Japan	108	Tokyo 1997, Manila 1998, Kyoto 1999, Taipei 1999, Tohoku 1999, Kyushu 1999, Taipei 2000, Sapporo 2000, Kyoto 2000, Hiroshima 2001, Kobe 2001, Shizuoka 2001, Sendai 2001, Nagoya 2002, Sapporo 2002, Utsunomiya 2002, Hiroshima 2003, Kyoto 2003, Bangkok 2003, Yokohama 2003, Shizuoka 2003, Okayama 2004, Sendai 2004, Kuala Lumpur 2004, Nagoya 2004, Yokohama 2004, Osaka 2005, Boston 2005, Singapore 2005, Matsuyama 2005, Niigata 2005, Taipei 2005, Kitakyushu 2005, Madison 2006, Hamamatsu 2006, Kuala Lumpur 2006, Toulouse 2006, St. Louis 2006, Hiroshima 2006, Yamagata 2006, Kyoto 2007, Strasbourg 2007, Florence 2007, Bangkok 2007, Kitakyushu 2007, Stuttgart 2007, Shizuoka 2008, Kobe 2008, Manila 2008, Okayama 2008, Taipei 2008, Singapore 2009, Kobe 2009, Bangkok 2009, Niigata 2009, Melbourne 2009, Kitakyushu 2009, Yokohama 2010, Manila 2010, Columbus 2010, Kobe 2011, Shanghai 2011, Pittsburgh 2011, Kobe 2012, Kuala Lumpur 2012, Manila 2012, Yokohama 2012, Costa Rica 2012, Philadelphia 2012, Taipei 2012, Nagoya 2012, Singapore 2013, Yokohama 2013, Hong Kong 2013, Beijing 2014, Nagoya 2014, Kobe 2014, Shizuoka 2015, Auckland 2015, Kyoto 2015, Shanghai 2015, Chiba 2015, Singapore 2015, Dallas 2015, Kobe 2015, Nagoya 2016, Beijing 2016, Tokyo 2016, Taipei 2016, Kyoto 2016, Kuala Lumpur 2016, Chiba 2016, Shizuoka 2017, Manila 2017, Shizuoka 2017, Hong Kong 2017, Kyoto 2018, Singapore 2018, Nagoya 2018, Melbourne 2018, Shizuoka 2018 (Legacy), Shizuoka 2018 (Standard), Yokohama 2019, Chiba 2019, Nagoya 2019, Nagoya 2020, Chiba 2025, Chiba 2026	78	Kenichi Fujita (2), Toshiki Tsukamoto, Yoshikazu Ishii, Masayuki Higashino (2), Tadayoshi Komiya (2), Satoshi Nakamura, Tsuyoshi Fujita (2), Itaru Ishida (2), Kohei Yamada, Kazuaki Arahori, Masashiro Kuroda (2), Katsuhiro Mori (4), Masahiko Morita (4), Shinichi Kumagai, Rei Hashimoto, Motokiyo Azuma, Akira Asahara (2), Shu Komuro (2), Kazuki Katou (2), Kazuya Shiki, Ichiro Shimura, Tatsunori Kishi, Masashi Oiso, Osamu Fujita, Tomohiro Kaji, Takanobu Sato, Katatsu Saitou, Takahiro Katayama, Yuusuke Tanii, Kenji Tsumura (2), Shuhei Nakamura (7), Takahiro Suzuki, Yuuya Watanabe (7), Tomoharu Saitou (4), Masami Kaneko, Jun'ya Iyanaga, Yuuta Takahashi (3), Hironobu Sugaya (2), Makihito Mihara (2), Shingou Kurihara, Tsuyoshi Ikeda, Taisuke Ishii, Naoki Nakada, Shouta Yasooka, Masahiro Hiraga, Jun'ichi Miyajima, Yuuji Okita, Ken Yukuhiro (2), Masaya Kitayama, Ryo Nakada, Ryousuke Kasuga, Teruya Kakumae (3), Akito Shinoda, Yuuki Ichikawa (4), Yuki Matsumoto (2), Hitomi Masaaki, Takuma Morofuji, Tomonori Hirami, Riku Kumagai (2), Kazuyuki Takimura, Fumiya Matsumoto, Kentaro Yamamoto (2), Ryohei Kirino, Ryoichi Tamada, Michio Abe, Syo Hayakawa, Kentaro Tachibana, Rei Sato (2), Ryouichi Yamamoto, Yuusuke Matsubara, Kazuki Takamura, Taiga Tsujikawa, Atsushi Nakashima, Takahito Kobayashi, Daisuke Nakamichi, Takuya Ishizuki, Kazuya Hirabayashi, Masataka Hori	76	Tokyo 1997, Kyoto 1999, Tohoku 1999, Kyushu 1999, Nagoya 2000, Sapporo 2000, Kyoto 2000, Hiroshima 2001, Yokohama 2001, Kobe 2001, Shizuoka 2001, Sendai 2001, Fukuoka 2002, Nagoya 2002, Sapporo 2002, Utsunomiya 2002, Hiroshima 2003, Kyoto 2003, Yokohama 2003, Shizuoka 2003, Okayama 2004, Sendai 2004, Nagoya 2004, Yokohama 2004, Osaka 2005, Matsuyama 2005, Niigata 2005, Kitakyushu 2005, Hamamatsu 2006, Hiroshima 2006, Yamagata 2006, Kyoto 2007, Kitakyushu 2007, Shizuoka 2008, Kobe 2008, Okayama 2008, Kobe 2009, Niigata 2009, Kitakyushu 2009, Yokohama 2010, Sendai 2010, Kobe 2011, Hiroshima 2011, Kobe 2012, Yokohama 2012, Nagoya 2012, Yokohama 2013, Kitakyushu 2013, Shizuoka 2013, Nagoya 2014, Kobe 2014, Shizuoka 2015, Kyoto 2015, Chiba 2015, Nagoya 2016, Tokyo 2016, Kyoto 2016, Chiba 2016, Shizuoka 2017, Kobe 2017, Kyoto 2017, Shizuoka 2017 (2nd), Kyoto 2018, Chiba 2018, Nagoya 2018, Shizuoka 2018 (2 separate GP's), Kyoto 2019, Yokohama 2019, Kitakyushu 2019, Chiba 2019, Nagoya 2019, Nagoya 2020, Chiba 2025, Chiba 2026, Shizuoka 2027
Canada	44	Austin 1998, Dallas 2000, Prague 2001, Detroit 2001, Moscow 2001, Yokohama 2001, Hong Kong 2001, Philadelphia 2002, Richmond 2006, New Jersey 2006, Toronto 2010, Montreal 2011, Seattle 2012, Atlantic City 2013, Calgary 2013, Kyoto 2013, Vancouver 2014, Richmond 2014, Atlanta 2014, Chicago 2014, Mexico City 2015, Vancouver 2015, Cleveland 2015, Kraków 2015, Toronto 2015, Buenos Aires 2015, Beijing 2015, Quebec City 2015, Toronto 2016, Las Vegas 2017 (Modern), Toronto 2017, New Jersey 2017, Columbus 2018, Toronto 2018, Montreal 2018, Warsaw 2018, Vancouver 2018, Niagara Falls 2019, Indianapolis 2019, Montreal 2019, New Jersey 2020, Reno 2020, Online Season 2 2020, Baltimore 2025	35	Gary Krakower, Matthew Vienneau (2), Ryan Fuller (3), Jeff Fung, Jeff Cunningham, Richard Hoaen (4), Guillaume Cardin, Jonathan Smithers, Robert Smith, Jon Stern (2), Alexander Hayne (5), Brian Liu, Tyler Blum, Dan Lanthier (2), Bill Tsang, Lucas Siow (2), Pascal Maynard (2), Robert Lombardi, Mani Davoudi, Robert Anderson, Kale Thompson, David Goldfarb, Edgar Magalhaes, Chris Harabas, Morgan McLaughlin, Christopher Huu Nguyen, Eduardo Sajgalik, Jason Fleurant (2), Daniel Goetschel, Mohamad Qadi, Joseph Karani, Kevin Brown, Isaak Krut, Nathaniel Knox, Alexandre MacIsaac	34	Toronto 1997, Montreal 2001, Toronto 2006, Montreal 2007, Vancouver 2008, Toronto 2010, Montreal 2011, Vancouver 2012, Toronto 2012, Quebec City 2013, Calgary 2013, Vancouver 2014, Montreal 2014, Ottawa 2014, Vancouver 2015, Toronto 2015, Montreal 2015, Quebec City 2015, Vancouver 2016, Toronto 2016, Montreal 2016, Vancouver 2017, Montreal 2017, Toronto 2017, Toronto 2018, Toronto 2018 (2nd), Montreal 2018, Vancouver 2018, Toronto 2019, Calgary 2019, Montreal 2019, Toronto 2026, Toronto 2027, Montreal 2027
France	38	Amsterdam 1997, Barcelona 1997, London 1997, Como 1997, Lyon 1998, Cannes 2000, Porto 2000, Biarritz 2001, Naples 2002, Amsterdam 2003, Lyon 2003, Munich 2003, Helsinki 2004, Eindhoven 2005, Bologna 2005, Bilbao 2005, Dallas 2007, Singapore 2007, Chicago 2009, Seattle 2009, Brighton 2009, Amsterdam 2011, Austin 2012, Lyon 2012, London 2013, Milan 2014, Prague 2015, Madison 2015, Lyon 2015, Manchester 2016, Utrecht 2017, Birmingham 2017, Warsaw 2017, Brussels 2018, Bilbao 2019, London 2019, Lyon 2019, Liverpool 2025	27	Emmanuel Vernay, Pierre Fayard, Michael Sochon, Michael Debard, Raphaël Lévy (6), Florent Jeudon, Antoine Ruel (2), Olivier Ruel (5), Nicolas Labarre, Pierre Malherbaud, Wilfried Ranque, Yann Hamon (2), Sebastien Roux, Gabriel Nassif, Yann Massicard, Pierre Sommen, Jérémy Dezani (3), Timothée Simonot, Eliott Boussaud, Damien Bouillot, Samuel Vuillot, Loïc Le Briand, Jean-Emmanuel Depraz, Guillaume Matignon, Alexandre Habert, Antoine Lagarde, Alexey Paulot	33	Lyon 1998, Tours 1999, Cannes 2000, Biarritz 2001, Reims 2002, Lyon 2003, Paris 2004, Lille 2006, Toulouse 2006, Strasbourg 2007, Paris 2008, Paris 2009, Lyon 2010, Paris 2011, Lille 2012, Lyon 2012, Strasbourg 2013, Paris 2014, Strasbourg 2014, Paris 2015, Lille 2015, Lyon 2015, Paris 2016, Lille 2016, Metz 2017, Lyon 2017, Lyon 2018, Lille 2018, Strasbourg 2019, Lyon 2019, Lyon 2020, Lyon 2026, Lille 2027
Germany	34	Antwerp 1998, Barcelona 1999, Vienna 1999, Oslo 1999, Amsterdam 1999, Frankfurt 2000, Cologne 2001, London 2001, Vienna 2001, Lisbon 2002, Antwerp 2002, Hamburg 2002, Reims 2002, Atlanta 2003, Genoa 2003, Madrid 2004, Brussels 2004, Dortmund 2006, Athens 2006, Hanover 2009, Prague 2009, Paris 2010, Madrid 2010, Lyon 2010, Ghent 2012, Warsaw 2013, Antwerp 2013, Barcelona 2014, Florence 2015, Rimini 2016, Copenhagen 2018, Bologna 2019, Utrecht 2025, Brussels 2026	33	Stephan Valkyser, Kai Budde (7), Jim Herold (3), Sebastian Moises, Gunnar Refsdal, Stephan Meyer, Simon Hockwin, Alex Mack, Marco Blume, Reinhard Blech, Tobias Henke, David Brucker, Sebastian Aljiaj, Lino Burgold, Jan Schmidt, Adrian Rosada (2), Andreas Müller, Florian Koch, Timo Schünemann, Wenzel Krautmann, Patrick Dickmann, Christian Seibold, Tobias Gräfensteiner, Daniel Gräfensteiner, Frank Schäfer, Rosario Maij, Arne Huschenbeth, Tobias Maurer, Marc Vogt, Raul Porojan, Thoralf Severin, Oliver Rausch, Jasper Grimmer	12	Frankfurt 2000, Cologne 2001, Heidelberg 2002, Hamburg 2002, Munich 2003, Bochum 2004, Leipzig 2005, Dortmund 2006, Stuttgart 2007, Hanover 2009, Bochum 2010, Bochum 2012
Brazil	26	São Paulo 1999, Rio de Janeiro 2001, Curitiba 2001, Amsterdam 2003, Phoenix 2006, Montreal 2007, Buenos Aires 2008, São Paulo 2009, Singapore 2011, Santiago 2011, São Paulo 2012, Toronto 2012, Rio de Janeiro 2013, Buenos Aires 2014, São Paulo 2014, Santiago 2014, São Paulo 2015, Porto Alegre 2015, São Paulo 2016, Atlanta 2016, Porto Alegre 2017, Las Vegas 2017 (Limited), São Paulo 2017, Santiago 2018, São Paulo 2019, São Paulo 2019 (2nd)	25	Rafael Assafi Alvarenga, Carlos Romão (5), Guilherme Svaldi, Celso Zampere, Jr., Francisco Braga, Daniel Almeida Alves, Paulo Vitor Damo da Rosa (2), Igor Silva Pinto, Reinaldo Gomes da Silva Jr., Willy Edel, José Francisco da Silva, Philippe Monlevade, Tulio Jaudy, Guilherme Merjan, Carlos dos Santos Estevez, Eduardo dos Santos Vieira, Marcos Paulo de Jesus Freitas, Eloi Pattaro, Francisco Barciella, Victor Fernando Silva, Thiago Saporito, João Lelis, Lucas Berthoud, Marlos Batista Ferreira, Thiago Rosenmann	18	Rio de Janeiro 1998, São Paulo 1999, Rio de Janeiro 2001, Curitiba 2001, São Paulo 2002, Porto Alegre 2004, São Paulo 2009, São Paulo 2012, Rio de Janeiro 2013, São Paulo 2014, São Paulo 2015, Porto Alegre 2015, São Paulo 2016, Porto Alegre 2017, São Paulo 2017, São Paulo 2018, São Paulo 2019, São Paulo 2019 (2nd)
Australia	24	Melbourne 1998, Sydney 2000, Cape Town 2001, Brisbane 2001, Melbourne 2002, Sydney 2003, Brisbane 2004, Melbourne 2005, Sydney 2006, Brisbane 2007, Sydney 2010, Brisbane 2011, Melbourne 2012, Sydney 2013, Brisbane 2013, Sydney 2014, Manila 2015, Melbourne 2016, Brisbane 2017, Sydney 2017, Sydney 2018, Sydney 2019, Brisbane 2019, Brisbane 2026	26	Philip Davey, Gordon Lin, Ben Seck (2), Richard Johnston, Andrew Grain, Will Copeman, James Zhang (2), Anatoli Lightfoot, Dominic Lo, Jeremy Neeman (2), David Crewe, Allen Zhang, Justin Robb, Paul Jackson, Joseph Sclauzero, David Mines, Oliver Oks, James Wilks, Simon Linabury, Ivan Schroder, Jessica Estephan, Ryan Lewis-Jonns, Lachlan Saunders, Jarron Puszet, Kyle Gibson, Jefferson Lee	27	Melbourne 1998, Sydney 2000, Brisbane 2001, Melbourne 2002, Sydney 2003, Brisbane 2004, Melbourne 2005, Sydney 2006, Brisbane 2007, Melbourne 2009, Sydney 2010, Brisbane 2011, Melbourne 2012, Sydney 2013, Brisbane 2013, Melbourne 2014, Sydney 2014, Sydney 2015, Melbourne 2016, Sydney 2016, Brisbane 2017, Sydney 2017, Sydney 2018, Melbourne 2018, Sydney 2019, Brisbane 2019, Brisbane 2026, Sydney 2027
Netherlands	19	Helsinki 2000, Gothenburg 2001, Heidelberg 2002, Barcelona 2002, Gothenburg 2003, Bochum 2004, Paris 2004, Mexico City 2005, Copenhagen 2005, Malmö 2006, Brussels 2008, Indianapolis 2008, Paris 2008, Rotterdam 2009, Bilbao 2013, Stockholm 2016, Amsterdam 2018, Copenhagen 2019, London 2026	18	Noah Boeken (2), Jos Schreurs, Kamiel Cornelissen (2), Jelger Wiegersma (2), Stijn Cornelissen, Tom van de Logt, Jesse Cornelissen, Wilco Pinkster, Julien Nuijten (2), Wessel Oomens, Arjan van Leeuwen (2), Mitchell Manders, Elmer van Eeghen, Jeroen Kreijne, Simon Geurts, Pim Heijne, Kim Homsma, Koen de Vos	17	Amsterdam 1997, Amsterdam 1999, Amsterdam 2001, Amsterdam 2003, Eindhoven 2005, Amsterdam 2007, Rotterdam 2009, Amsterdam 2011, Utrecht 2013, Utrecht 2014, Utrecht 2015, Rotterdam 2016, Utrecht 2017, Amsterdam 2017, Amsterdam 2018, Utrecht 2019, Utrecht 2025, Utrecht 2027
Czech Republic	15	London 2002, Nottingham 2005, Portland 2010, Bochum 2010, Prague 2011, Hiroshima 2011, Bochum 2012, Brussels 2015, Paris 2016, Barcelona 2017, Amsterdam 2017, Providence 2017, Washington D.C. 2018, Stockholm 2018, Bangkok 2019	7	Jakub Šlemr, Nikola Vávra, Martin Jůza (5), Ondřej Baudyš, Lukáš Blohon (2), Petr Sochůrek (4), Ondřej Stráský	11	Prague 2001, Prague 2003, Prague 2009, Prague 2011, Prague 2013, Prague 2014, Prague 2015, Prague 2016, Prague 2017, Prague 2018, Prague 2019
Italy	15	Rimini 2004, Rimini 2008, Brussels 2010, Florence 2010, Milan 2011, Malmö 2012, Moscow 2012, Utrecht 2015, Lille 2015, Madrid 2016, Bologna 2017, Copenhagen 2017, Metz 2017, Bologna 2018, Lyon 2020	16	Domingo Ottati, Emanuele Giusti (2), Pierluigi Aceto, Marco Ricci, Matteo Versari, Luca Casadei, Davide Vergoni, Claudio Bonanni, Carmine D'Aniello, Corrado De Sio, Mattia Rizzi, Francesco Fritto Hugony, Antonio Pinto, Davide Miani, Usama Sajjad, Biagio Ruocco	26	Como 1998, Milan 1999, Florence 2000, Turin 2001, Naples 2002, Genoa 2003, Rimini 2004, Bologna 2005, Turin 2006, Florence 2007, Rimini 2008, Florence 2010, Milan 2011, Turin 2012, Verona 2013, Rimini 2013, Milan 2014, Milan 2014 (2nd), Florence 2015, Bologna 2016, Rimini 2016, Bologna 2017, Turin 2017, Bologna 2018, Turin 2018, Bologna 2019
Denmark	13	Copenhagen 1997, Philadelphia 2000, Copenhagen 2000, Oslo 2001, Madrid 2008, Strasbourg 2013, Gothenburg 2013, Liverpool 2015, Lyon 2017, Birmingham 2018 (Standard), Barcelona 2019, Las Vegas 2019 (Modern), Lyon 2026	11	Karsten Hoppe, Trey Van Cleave (2), Niels Jensen, Lasse Nørgaard, Thomas Enevoldsen (2), Oscar Christiensen, Martin Dang, Christoffer Larsen, Michael Bonde, Simon Nielsen (3), Troels Munk	9	Copenhagen 1997, Copenhagen 2000, Copenhagen 2002, Copenhagen 2005, Copenhagen 2008, Copenhagen 2015, Copenhagen 2017, Copenhagen 2018, Copenhagen 2019
Spain	12	Madrid 2000, Valencia 2001, Barcelona 2009, Barcelona 2011, Paris 2014, Vienna 2014, Prague 2016, Rotterdam 2016, Madrid 2017, Chiba 2018, Ghent 2019, Brussels 2020	13	Carlos Barrado, Ricard Tuduri, Joel Calafell (2), Martin Scheinin, Javier Dominguez (2), Aniol Alcaraz, Rodrigo Togores (2), Cristian Ortiz Ros, Adrian Ramiro Cano, Guillem Salvador Arnal, Ruben Pérez, Esther Trujillo, Carlos Moral	30	Barcelona 1997, Madrid 1998, Barcelona 1999, Madrid 2000, Valencia 2001, Barcelona 2002, Sevilla 2003, Madrid 2004, Bilbao 2005, Barcelona 2006, Madrid 2008, Barcelona 2009, Madrid 2010, Barcelona 2011, Madrid 2012, Bilbao 2013, Valencia 2013, Barcelona 2014, Madrid 2014, Sevilla 2015, Madrid 2015, Barcelona 2016, Madrid 2016, Barcelona 2017, Madrid 2017, Madrid 2018, Barcelona 2018, Bilbao 2019, Barcelona 2019, Valencia 2027
China	12	Beijing 2005, Shanghai 2012, Beijing 2013, Shanghai 2014, Providence 2016, Shanghai 2017, Indianapolis 2018, Seattle 2018 (Standard), Beijing 2018, Hong Kong 2018, Atlanta 2018, Beijing 2026	13	Dong Zhong, Bo Li, Quan Zhou, Yu Yin, Yichen Wang, Huachao Song, Xinyu Fei, Zirui Zhou, Gan Yan, Zhiyang Zhang, Fei Xu, Peiyuan Zheng, Que Mo	15	Beijing 2005, Shanghai 2011, Shanghai 2012, Beijing 2013, Beijing 2014, Shanghai 2014, Shanghai 2015, Beijing 2015, Beijing 2016, Guangzhou 2016, Beijing 2017, Shanghai 2017, Beijing 2018, Beijing 2026, Beijing 2027
United Kingdom	11	Birmingham 1998, Hasselt 2006, Cardiff 2006, London 2011, Lille 2012, Bologna 2016, Liverpool 2017, Madrid 2018, Birmingham 2018 (Legacy), Turin 2018, Birmingham 2019	13	Craig Jones, Sam Gomersall, Martin Dingler, Daniel Royde, Richard Parker, Kayure Patel, Marc Purvis, Christoph Green, Ben Jones, Charles Eliatamby, Gary Campbell, Joao Choca, Rory Kear-Smith	29	London 1997, Birmingham 1998, Manchester 2000, London 2001, London 2002, London 2003, Birmingham 2004, Nottingham 2005, Cardiff 2006, Birmingham 2008, Brighton 2009, London 2011, Manchester 2012, London 2013, Manchester 2014, Liverpool 2015, London 2015, Manchester 2016, London 2016, Birmingham 2017, Liverpool 2017, London 2018, Birmingham 2018 (2 separate GP's), Liverpool 2018, London 2019, Birmingham 2019, Liverpool 2025, London 2026
Sweden	11	Stockholm 1998, Warsaw 2001, Sevilla 2003, Singapore 2003, Copenhagen 2008, Gothenburg 2010, Utrecht 2013, Milan 2014, Orlando 2017, Minneapolis 2018, Utrecht 2019	12	Olle Råde, Rickard Österberg, Anton Jonsson, Mikael Polgary, David Larsson, Kenny Öberg, Fredrik Carlsson, Jonathan Bergström, Tomas Westling, Magnus Lantto (2), Joel Larsson, Johannes Alberyd	11	Stockholm 1998, Gothenburg 2001, Gothenburg 2003, Malmö 2006, Stockholm 2007, Gothenburg 2010, Malmö 2012, Gothenburg 2013, Stockholm 2014, Stockholm 2016, Stockholm 2018
Austria	10	Florence 2000, Prague 2003, Birmingham 2004, Vienna 2004, Lille 2005, Barcelona 2006, Rimini 2013, Utrecht 2014, Madrid 2014, Seville 2015	7	Benedikt Klauser, Stefan Jedlicka (2), Nikolaus Eigner, Helmut Summersberger (2), Christoph Aukenthaler, Oliver Polak-Rottmann, Immanuel Gerschenson (2)	6	Vienna 1999, Vienna 2001, Vienna 2004, Vienna 2008, Vienna 2013, Vienna 2014
Singapore	9	Nagoya 2000, Singapore 2000, Singapore 2001, Kuala Lumpur 2002, Kuala Lumpur 2010, Kuala Lumpur 2014, Guangzhou 2016, Beijing 2017, Singapore 2017	7	Nick Wong, Sam Lau, Albertus Hui Chin Law (2), Ding Yuan Leong (2), Fabien Li, Kelvin Chew, Lim Zhong Yi	11	Singapore 2000, Singapore 2001, Singapore 2003, Singapore 2005, Singapore 2007, Singapore 2009, Singapore 2011, Singapore 2013, Singapore 2015, Singapore 2017, Singapore 2018
Argentina	8	Santiago 2001, São Paulo 2002, Amsterdam 2003, London 2003, Porto Alegre 2004, Rotterdam 2016, Santiago 2017, Santiago 2018	7	Matias Grabenja, Gabriel Caligaris, Jose Barbero (2), Diego Ostrovich, Luis Salvatto (2), Mauro Sasso, Sebastian Pozzo	4	Buenos Aires 2000, Buenos Aires 2008, Buenos Aires 2014, Buenos Aires 2015
Switzerland	7	Zürich 2004, Turin 2006, Madrid 2012, Valencia 2013, Charlotte 2016, Lille 2018, Strasbourg 2019	7	Manuel Bucher, Nico Bohny, Ivo Grossholz, Samuel Marti, Andreas Ganz, Etienne Busson, Yves Sele	2	Zürich 1998, Zürich 2004
Mexico	6	Buenos Aires 2000, Guadalajara 2013, Dallas 2013, London 2018, Houston 2018, Liverpool 2018	7	Hugo Araiza, Andres Martinez, Marlon Gutierrez, Marcelino Freeman (2), Axel Martinez Ocampo, Daniel Becerra, Dagoberto Silva	8	Mexico City 2005, Mexico City 2012, Guadalajara 2013, Mexico City 2014, Mexico City 2015, Mexico City 2016, Mexico City 2017, Mexico City 2018
Venezuela	6	Warsaw 2014, Manchester 2014, London 2015, Mexico City 2016, Barcelona 2016, Online Season 1 2020	1	Fabrizio Anteri (6)	0	
Portugal	5	Lisbon 1998, Lisbon 1999, Lisbon 2005, London 2016, Rotterdamn 2016	3	Bruno Cardoso, Helder Coelho, Márcio Carvalho (3)	6	Lisbon 1998, Lisbon 1999, Porto 2000, Lisbon 2002, Lisbon 2005, Lisbon 2012
Malaysia	5	Kuala Lumpur 2000, Hong Kong 2004, Kitakyushu 2013, Hong Kong 2015, Kobe 2017	5	Ryan Soh, Chuen Hwa Tan, Raymond Tan, Chye Yian Hsiang, Joe Soh	8	Kuala Lumpur 2000, Kuala Lumpur 2002, Kuala Lumpur 2004, Kuala Lumpur 2006, Kuala Lumpur 2010, Kuala Lumpur 2012, Kuala Lumpur 2014, Kuala Lumpur 2016
Poland	5	Vienna 2008, Vienna 2013, Copenhagen 2015, Lille 2016, Lyon 2018	5	Mateusz Kopeć, Marcin Staciwa, Przemek Knociński, Maciek Berger, Grzegorz Kowalski	9	Warsaw 2001, Kraków 2007, Warsaw 2013, Warsaw 2014, Kraków 2015, Warsaw 2016, Warsaw 2017, Warsaw 2018, Kraków 2019
Russia	4	Leipzig 2005, Stockholm 2007, Prague 2013, Moscow 2014	4	Rustam Bakirov, Nikolay Potovin, Anatoly Chukhwicov, Igor Gorbunov	3	Moscow 2001, Moscow 2012, Moscow 2014
Taiwan	4	Kaohsiung 2001, Taipei 2002, Taipei 2014, Indianapolis 2018	4	Tobey Tamber, Sheng Hsun Hsia, Hao-Shan Huang, Yeh Chih-Cheng	11	Taipei 1999, Taipei 2000, Kaohsiung 2001, Taipei 2001, Taipei 2002, Taipei 2005, Taipei 2008, Taipei 2012, Taipei 2014, Taipei 2016, Taipei 2019
Chile	4	Santiago 2013, Santiago 2015, Santiago 2016, São Paulo 2018	4	Luis Navas, Rodrigo López Cáceres, John Chavarría, Jose Echeverria Paredes	8	Santiago 2001, Santiago 2011, Santiago 2013, Santiago 2014, Santiago 2015, Santiago 2016, Santiago 2017, Santiago 2018
South Korea	4	Melbourne 2014, Minneapolis 2014, Kyoto 2019, Taipei 2019	4	Sung-wook Nam, Jun-young Park, Dae-kyeung Bae, Seok-hyun Kim	0	
Slovakia	3	Amsterdam 2007, Lisbon 2012, Stockholm 2014	4	Michael Havlik, Richard Hornansky, Ivan Floch, Matej Zatlkaj	0	
Slovenia	3	Milan 1999, Boston 2014, Turin 2017	2	Ziga Fritz, Robin Dolar (2)	0	
Belgium	3	Manchester 2012, Paris 2015, Prague 2019	3	Alexandre Darras, Amand Dosimont, Pascal Vieren	13	Antwerp 1998, Antwerp 2002, Brussels 2004, Hasselt 2006, Brussels 2008, Brussels 2010, Ghent 2012, Antwerp 2013, Brussels 2015, Brussels 2018, Ghent 2019, Brussels 2020, Brussels 2026
Philippines	2	Manila 1999, Manila 2006	2	Christopher Parreña, James Porter	8	Manila 1998, Manila 1999, Manila 2006, Manila 2008, Manila 2010, Manila 2012, Manila 2015, Manila 2017
Indonesia	2	Denver 2013, Bangkok 2013	2	Vidianto Wijaya, Patriawan Kurniadi	0	
New Zealand	2	Auckland 2012, Sydney 2015	2	Walker MacMurdo, John Seaton	3	Auckland 2008, Auckland 2012, Auckland 2015
Finland	2	Barcelona 2018, Prague 2018	2	Matti Kuisma, Lauri Pispa	2	Helsinki 2000, Helsinki 2004
Hungary	2	Strasbourg 2014, Calgary 2019	2	Tamás Nagy, Attila Fur	0	
Hong Kong	1	Birmingham 2008	1	Shi Tian Lee	6	Hong Kong 2001, Hong Kong 2004, Hong Kong 2013, Hong Kong 2015, Hong Kong 2017, Hong Kong 2018
Ukraine	1	Verona 2013	1	Mike Krasnitski	0	
Croatia	1	Prague 2014	1	Vjeran Horvat	1	Zagreb 2027
Serbia	1	Madrid 2015	1	Aleksa Telarov	0	
Lithuania	1	Warsaw 2016	1	Gabrielius Kaklauskas	0	
Turkey	1	Prague 2017	1	Yusuf Kemal Vefa	0	
Norway	1	Kraków 2019	1	Sveinung Bjørnerud	2	Oslo 1999, Oslo 2001
Thailand	0		0		5	Bangkok 2003, Bangkok 2007, Bangkok 2009, Bangkok 2013, Bangkok 2019
Costa Rica	0		0		2	San José 2012, San José 2016
Greece	0		0		1	Athens 2006
South Africa	0		0		1	Cape Town 2001
Online	0		0		2	Online 2020 Season 1, Online 2020 Season 2

== See also ==
- Grand Prix
- The DCI
