= Alex Shvartsman =

American science fiction and fantasy writer

- Shvartsman at World Fantasy Convention 2026
- Born: November 19, 1975 (age 50); Odesa, Ukrainian SSR, Soviet Union (now Ukraine)
- Occupations: Science fiction writer, editor, translator (Russian)
- Spouse: Zoya Shapiro (m. 2007)
- Children: 1
- Writing career
- Period: 2010–present
- Genres: Fantasy; Science fiction
- Website: alexshvartsman.com

Alex Shvartsman (born November 19, 1975) is an American science fiction and fantasy writer and editor known primarily for humorous short stories. He won the WSFA Small Press Award for Short Fiction in 2014 for his short story "Explaining Cthulhu to Grandma" published in the InterGalactic Medicine Show magazine. He won the WSFA Small Press Award in 2014 and was a finalist for the Canopus Award for Excellence in Interstellar Writing in 2015 and 2017.

Alex Shvartsman is also a Magic: The Gathering player. While having enjoyed only a moderate degree of success on the Pro Tour, he is one of the most successful Grand Prix players ever. With 21 appearances, Shvartsman held the record for most Grand Prix top eights for a long time, but is now ranked 12th tied with Shota Yasooka.

== Bibliography ==
=== Full-length books ===
- Explaining Cthulhu to Grandma and Other Stories, UFO Publishing, 2015
- H. G. Wells, Secret Agent, UFO Publishing, 2015
- The Golem of Deneb Seven and Other Stories, UFO Publishing, 2018
- Eridani's Crown, UFO Publishing, 2019
- The Middling Affliction, The Conradverse Chronicles, Book 1, Caezik SF & Fantasy, 2022
- Kakistocracy - The Conradverse Chronicles, Book 2, Caezik SF & Fantasy, 2023
- Dreidel of Dread: The Very Cthulhu Hanukkah, UFO Publishing, 2024
- The Best of All Possible Planets, UFO Publishing, 2026

=== Selected short stories ===
- "How Gaia and the Guardian Saved the World", Amazing Stories, 2016
- "One in a Million", On Spec, 2016
- "Whom He May Devour", Nautilus, 2016
- "Islands in the Sargasso", Galaxy's Edge, 2015
- "Burying Treasure", Chicks and Balances (Baen Books), 2015
- "He Who Watches", Fireside, 2015
- "The Golem of Deneb Seven", InterGalactic Medicine Show, 2014
- "The Keepsake Box", Daily Science Fiction, 2014
- "High-Tech Fairies and the Pandora Perplexity", InterGalactic Medicine Show, 2014
- "In the Wake of the Storm", Buzzy Magazine, 2013
- "The Rumination on What Isn't", Nature, 2013
- "The Tinker Bell Problem", Buzzy Magazine, 2013
- "Things We Leave Behind", Daily Science Fiction, 2013
- "Explaining Cthulhu to Grandma", InterGalactic Medicine Show, 2013
- "The Epistolary History", Nature, 2013
- "A Gnomish Gift", Weird Tales, 2013
- "Requiem for a Druid", Galaxy's Edge, 2013
- "The Miracle on Tau Prime", Daily Science Fiction, 2013
- "The Tell-Tale Ear", Nature, 2012
- "Nuclear Family", Kasma SF, 2012
- "Ravages of Time", Nature, 2012
- "A Shard Glows in Brooklyn", Buzzy Magazine 2012
- "The Take", Daily Science Fiction, 2012
- "Spidersong", Daily Science Fiction, 2011
- Link to complete bibliography.

=== As editor ===
- "Unidentified Funny Objects: An Anthology of Science Fiction & Fantasy Humor". United States: UFO Publishing, 2012.
- "Unidentified Funny Objects 2". United States: UFO Publishing, 2013.
- "Coffee: 14 Caffeinated Tales of the Fantastic". United States: UFO Publishing, 2013.
- "Dark Expanse: Surviving the Collapse". United States: Deorc Enterprise, 2014.
- "Unidentified Funny Objects 3". United States: UFO Publishing, 2014.
- "Funny Science Fiction". United States: UFO Publishing, 2015.
- "Unidentified Funny Objects 4". United States: UFO Publishing, 2015.
- "Funny Fantasy". United States: UFO Publishing, 2016.
- "Unidentified Funny Objects 5". United States: UFO Publishing, 2016.
- "Humanity 2.0". United States: Arc Manor / Phoenix Pick, 2016.
- "Funny Horror". United States: UFO Publishing, 2017.
- "Unidentified Funny Objects 6". United States: UFO Publishing, 2017.
- "The Cackle of Cthulhu". United States: Baen Books, 2018.
- Future Science Fiction Digest, 2018
- "Unidentified Funny Objects 7" United States: UFO Publishing, 2018.
- "Unidentified Funny Objects 8" United States: UFO Publishing, 2020.
- "Unidentified Funny Objects 9" United States: UFO Publishing, 2022.
- "The Digital Aesthete" United States: CAEZIK SF & Fantasy, 2023
- "Unidentified Funny Objects 10" United States: UFO Publishing, 2026.

=== As translator (From Russian to English) ===
- If You Call Now - Sergey Lukyanenko - UFO, 2012
- The Ferryman - Siarhey Bulyha - Spark v. 6, 2014
- Black Hole Heart - K.A. Teryna - Apex, 2017
- Untilted - K.A. Teryna - Apex, 2017
- Impress Me, Then We'll Talk About the Money Tatiana Ivanova - UFO6, 2017
- The Scheduled War - Tatiana Ivanova - Amazing Stories, 2019
- Americans on the Moon - Oleg Divov - Future SF, 2019
- The Building Atop the Hill - Alexander Bachilo - Future SF, 2019
- Morpheus - K.A. Teryna - Samovar, 2019
- The Slave - Andrej Kokoulin - F&SF, 2019
- The Green Hills of Andrej Totzkiy - Eldar Safin - Samovar, 2020
- No One Ever Leaves Port Henri - K.A. Teryna - Galaxy's Edge, 2020
- The Chartreuse Sky - Alexander Bachilo & K.A. Teryna - Asimov's - April 2021
- I'm Feeling Lucky - Leonid Kaganov - Clarkesworld - July 2021
- The Jellyfish - K.A. Teryna - Future SF, 2021
- When the Mujna Begins - Oleg Divov - Future SF, 2021
- Lajos and his Bees - K.A. Teryna - F&SF - November 2021
- The Tale of Ak and Humanity - Yefim Zozulya - Tor.com - January 2022
- The Living Furniture - Yefim Zozulya - F&SF, 2022
- The Tin Pilot - K.A. Teryna - Asimov's, 2022
- Fly Free - Alan Kubatiev - Clarkesworld, 2022
- The Loving Home - Olga Fix - Future SF, 2022
- The Farctory - K.A. Teryna
- The Best of World SF 2 - Head of Zeus, 2022
- Cain and Abel - Yefim Zozulya - Galaxy's Edge, 2023
- Incommunicado - Andrej Kokoulin, 2023
- The Errata - K.A. Teryna - Asimov's, 2023
- Yuletide Cyberpunk - Viktor Pelevin - The Big Book of Cyberpunk, 2023
- Emil's Labyrinth - Anna Mikhalevskaya - The Digital Aesthete, 2023
- The Unknown Painter - H. L. Oldie - The Digital Aesthete, 2023 - BSFA Award Finalist
- The Rattler - Leo Kaganov - Asimov's - May 2024 - Asimov's Readers' Award Finalist
- Unboxing the Beast - Vladimir Mistyukov & Shimun Vrochek, 2024 - NOVEL
- Songs of the Snow Whale - K.A. Teryna - Reactor - December 2024 - BSFA Award Finalist
- Pollen - Anna Burdenko - Clarkesworld, 2025 - Clarkesworld Readers' Poll Finalist, BSFA Award Finalist
- Serpent Carriers - K.A. Teryna - Clarkesworld, 2025
- Black Hole Heart and Other Stories - K.A. Teryna - Fairwood Press, 2025 - COLLECTION
- The Rattler - UncleWind & Leo Kaganov - Ongoing - Web Comic
- All My Birds - K.A. Teryna - Asimov's, 2026

== Magic: The Gathering achievements ==
Season	Event type	Location	Format	Date	Rank
1998–99	Grand Prix	Barcelona	Limited	4–7 February 1999	2
1998–99	Grand Prix	Taipei		24–25 April 1999	7
1999–00	Grand Prix	Lisbon		25–27 September 1999	6
1999–00	Grand Prix	Sao Paulo	Limited	6–7 November 1999	4
1999–00	Grand Prix	Tours		26–27 November 1999	1
1999–00	Grand Prix	Seattle	Extended	15–16 January 2000	5
1999–00	Grand Prix	Madrid	Extended	29–30 January 2000	3
1999–00	Grand Prix	Taipei	Extended	12–13 February 2000	3
1999–00	Grand Prix	Cannes	Team Limited	26–27 February 2000	2
1999-00	Grand Prix	Nagoya	Team Limited	22–23 April 2000	1
2000–01	Invitational	Sydney	Special	16–19 November 2000	6
2000–01	Masters	Chicago	Booster Draft	1–3 December 2000	3
2000–01	Grand Prix	Rio de Janeiro	Sealed and Booster Draft	10–11 March 2001	2
2001–02	Pro Tour	New York	Team Limited	7–9 September 2001	3
2001–02	Grand Prix	Brisbane	Sealed and Booster Draft	20–21 October 2001	3
2001–02	Grand Prix	Curitiba	Extended	8–9 December 2001	2
2001–02	Grand Prix	Houston	Extended	5–6 January 2002	6
2001–02	Grand Prix	Lisbon	Extended	19–20 January 2002	6
2001–02	Grand Prix	Fukuoka	Sealed and Booster Draft	16–17 February 2002	1
2001–02	Grand Prix	Kuala Lumpur	Sealed and Booster Draft	30–31 March 2002	5
2001–02	Grand Prix	New Jersey	Team Limited	29–30 June 2002	2
2002–03	Masters	Houston	Booster Draft	8–10 November 2002	5
2002–03	Grand Prix	Pittsburgh	Team Limited	31 May–1 June 2003	1
2002–03	Grand Prix	Detroit	Block Constructed	12–13 July 2003	4
2003–04	Grand Prix	Washington D.C.	Team Limited	17–18 April 2004	3

Last updated: 17 August 2009
Source: Wizards.com
