= Pascal Maynard =

Canadian Magic: The Gathering player (born 1993)

- Maynard in 2022
- Nickname: PMayne
- Born: 1993 (age 32–33); Saint-Georges, Quebec, Canada
- Pro Tour debut: 2007
- Winnings: $101,650
- Pro Tour wins (Top 8): 0 (2)
- Grand Prix wins (Top 8): 2 (13)

Pascal Maynard (born 1993) is a Canadian Magic: The Gathering player and game store owner.

Maynard began playing Magic as a child, won local junior tournaments, then joined the Magic: The Gathering Pro Tour as part of the Canadian National Team while a teenager. Over the next ten years he competed in Magic tournaments at a high level, making multiple final rounds, and winning two. At one tournament, he caused controversy when he drafted a foil Tarmogoyf, an expensive card that he could not play in his deck at the time, with the goal of reselling it for profit; he ended up selling it partly for charity.

In 2020, Maynard opened a Quebec City game store to replace the one he had played, then worked at, as a teen and young adult.

== Early life ==
Maynard was born in 1993 and comes from Saint-Georges-de-Beauce, Quebec. He grew up speaking French, with weak English.

Maynard was introduced to Magic: The Gathering at the age of 10. He remembers watching MTG Pro Tour Los Angeles 2005 at the age of 11 and a half, and deciding to make emulating the French winner Antoine Ruel his life goal. After playing with his friends, Maynard moved on to improve his skills at his local games store, which he would later work for as a young adult. He won his first two Junior Super Series tournaments (for ages 15 and under, ending in 2007), gaining him scholarship money, free magic cards for each year, and interaction with big city Montreal players who made both his Magic: The Gathering and English language skills better.

== Competitive Magic: The Gathering ==
Maynard played in his first MTG Grand Prix, in 2007 in Montreal, not making the finals, but ending 7-2. In 2010, he made the Canadian National Team going to the MTG World Championship, then over the next five years made the finals in seven Grand Prix (winning Grand Prix Mexico City, on February 1, 2015) and was invited to 13 Pro Tours.

=== #Goyfgate ===
On May 31, 2015, Maynard was playing in the final draft of MTG Grand Prix Las Vegas, the largest Magic tournament of all time, with almost 8000 participants. He had made it to the Top 8 players, and his play was being filmed and commented on, live. In the second pack of the draft, he opened a foil-covered Tarmogoyf, a rare and powerful green card, that did not fit the red-white strategy he had picked from the first pack. It was, however, estimated to be worth $300 on the secondary market, possibly even over $1000 given where it was opened. Maynard had the opportunity to pick a Burst Lightning, a red card, in the same pack, but it would been worth far less afterwards. Maynard had less than a minute to choose. He showed the Burst Lightning to the camera, acknowledging the correct choice for his deck, then chose the Tarmogoyf. He did not use it in his deck, and though he won his first match, ended up losing in the semifinals.

The next day, the Magic community was vocally divided over his decision, in the controversy called "#Goyfgate". Some fans supported Maynard's choice, given the costs of competitive play, but professional players including William Jensen, Owen Turtenwald, and Reid Duke stated on social media that they had lost all respect for, or were disgusted by, Maynard. Maynard himself posted on Facebook that, after having the time to think it over, he agreed with the pros, if not the aggressiveness of their words. He wrote that he played "mostly to maintain the ability to travel, eat, pay rent and not have to work a regular job", and that the Tarmogoyf money would mean the chance to go to more Grand Prix, forgetting that a slightly better deck would possibly mean going to the Magic: The Gathering World Championship or achieving higher competitive player rank. Jensen, Turtenwald, and Duke apologized for their language the next day.

Maynard put the card up on the auction website eBay, giving its history, and stating half the proceeds would go to the Gamers Helping Gamers charity. Sources reported bids over $19,000, or it selling for $14,900. However Maynard said that those were fake bids on eBay that he could not remove; he took down that auction and made a silent auction on Facebook and Twitter, where the card sold for $2000, of which he gave 75% to the charity.

=== After #Goyfgate ===
Maynard continued in competitive Magic: The Gathering, winning his next Grand Prix in Buenos Aires on June 28, 2015. He came in 7th at MTG Pro Tour Gatewatch in Atlanta in February 2016, and was a finalist at MTG Pro Tour Ixalan in Albuquerque in November 2017, coming in second to Seth Manfield. By that time, he had 13 Grand Prix Top 8s, with two wins.

In January 2019, in response to the decline in Quebec game shops hosting card tournaments, Maynard co-founded an esports sports league called Arena Super Cup, allowing people to compete from their homes using Magic: The Gathering Arena. It drew 300 participants during its first six months.

== Game store ==
Maynard honed his early Magic: The Gathering skills as a pre-teen at Le Donjon, or the Librairie Donjon, a Saint-Roch, Quebec City games store where he would later work for several years as a teenager and young adult. The store was a center for Quebec City gaming activity for 27 years before it closed in 2016; it was housed in the basement of the Gabrielle Roy library, and was closed when the city wanted to expand the library. It was the last store of its kind in the city center.

To serve the gaming community and recreate this place of his childhood, in October 2020, Maynard founded La Boutique Mythique, or The Mythic Store, as a Saint-Roch card game store specializing in Magic: The Gathering, and partnering with Le Bastion, an adjacent miniature wargaming shop, with a shared space for playing the games. Maynard had met the owner of the Bastion when both played at Le Donjon together. At the time the store opened, the COVID-19 pandemic restricted face to face gaming, so the store offered online tournaments as "The Mythic Society". By 2023, the store was holding daily in person gaming events, and even expanded into a neighboring warehouse, quadrupling its storage space.
